= Concordat of Worms =

1122 treaty between the Catholic Church and the Holy Roman Empire

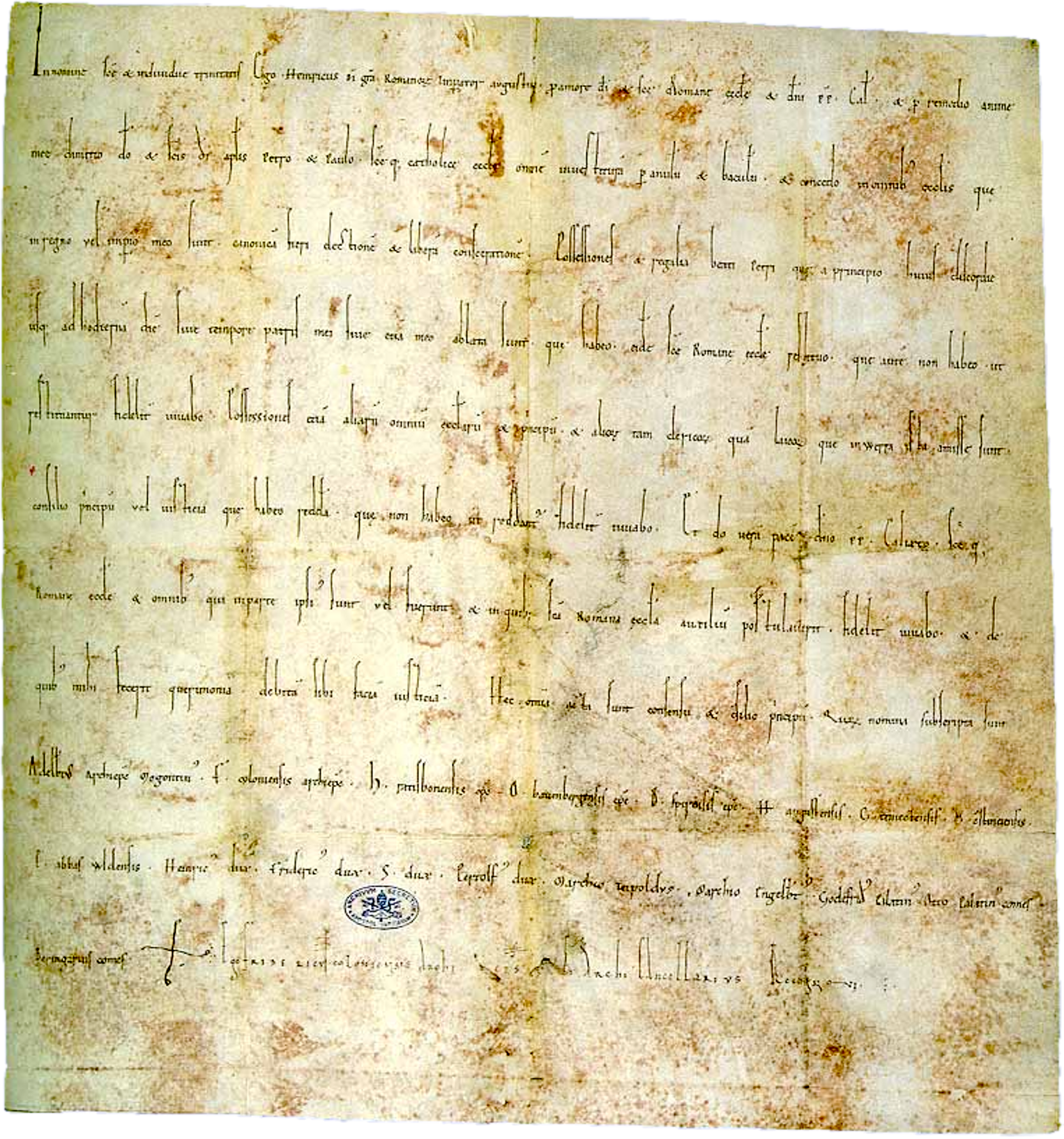
The Concordat of Worms, written in Papal minuscule on Vellum

The Concordat of Worms (Latin: Concordatum Wormatiense; German: Wormser Konkordat), also referred to as the Pactum Callixtinum or Pactum Calixtinum, was an agreement between the Catholic Church and the Holy Roman Empire which regulated the procedure for the appointment of bishops and abbots in the Empire. Signed on 23 September 1122 in the German city of Worms by Pope Callixtus II and Emperor Henry V, the agreement set an end to the Investiture Controversy, a conflict between state and church over the right to appoint religious office holders that had begun in the middle of the 11th century.

By signing the concordat, Henry renounced his right to invest bishops and abbots with ring and crosier, and opened ecclesiastical appointments in his realm to canonical elections. Callixtus, in turn, agreed to the presence of the emperor or his officials at the elections and granted the emperor the right to intervene in the case of disputed outcomes. The emperor was also allowed to perform a separate ceremony in which he would invest bishops and abbots with a sceptre, representing the lands that constituted the temporalities associated with their episcopal see.

== Background ==
During the middle of the 11th century, a reformist movement within the Christian Church sought to reassert the rights of the Holy See at the expense of the European monarchs. Having been elected in 1073, the reformist Pope Gregory VII proclaimed several edicts aimed at strengthening the authority of the papacy, some of which were formulated in the Dictatus papae of 1075. Gregory's edicts postulated that secular rulers were answerable to the pope and forbade them to make appointments to clerical offices (a process known as investiture).

The pope's doctrines were vehemently rejected by Emperor Henry IV, who habitually invested the bishops and abbots of the Holy Roman Empire. The ensuing conflict between the Empire and the papacy is known as the Investiture Controversy. The dispute continued after the death of Gregory VII in 1084 and the abdication of Henry IV in 1105.

Even though Henry IV's son and successor, Emperor Henry V, looked towards reconciliation with the reformist movement, no lasting compromise was achieved in the first 16 years of his reign. In 1111, Henry V brokered an agreement with Pope Paschal II at Sutri, whereby he would abstain from investing clergy in his realm in exchange for the restoration of church property that had originally belonged to the Empire. The Sutri agreement, Henry hoped, would convince Paschal to assent to Henry's official coronation as emperor.

The agreement failed to be implemented, leading Henry to imprison the pope. After two months of captivity, Paschal vowed to grant the coronation and to accept the emperor's role in investiture ceremonies. He also agreed never to excommunicate Henry. Given that these concessions had been won by force, ecclesiastical opposition to the Empire continued. The following year, Paschal reneged on his promises.

== Mouzon summit ==
In January 1118, Pope Paschal died. He was succeeded by Gelasius II, who died in January 1119. His successor, the Burgundian Callixtus II, resumed negotiations with the Emperor with the aim of settling the dispute between the church and the Empire. In the autumn of 1119, two papal emissaries, William of Champeaux and Pons of Cluny, met Henry at Strasbourg, where the emperor agreed in principle to abandon the secular investiture ceremony that involved giving new bishops and abbots a ring and a crosier.

The two parties scheduled a final summit between Henry and Callixtus at Mouzon, but the meeting ended abruptly after the emperor refused to accept a short-notice change in Callixtus's demands. The church leaders, who were deliberating their position at a council in Reims, reacted by excommunicating Henry. However, they did not endorse the pope's insistence upon the complete abandonment of secular investiture. The negotiations ended in failure.

Historians disagree as to whether Calixtus actually wanted peace or fundamentally mistrusted Henry. Due to his uncompromising position in 1111, Calixtus has been termed an "ultra", and his election to the papacy may indicate that the College of Cardinals saw no reason to show weakness to the emperor. (Note: Colin Morris notes that, while Calixtus was related to the House of Salian, the Imperial royal family, he "belonged to a family with a tradition of political resistance to it".) This optimism about victory was founded on the very visible, and very vocal opposition to Henry from within his own nobility, and the cardinals may have seen the emperor's internal weaknesses as an opportunity for outright victory.

== Further negotiations ==
After the failure of the Mouzon negotiations, and the disappearance into the horizon of the chances of Henry's unconditional surrender, the majority of the clergy became willing to compromise in order to settle the dispute. The polemic writings and pronouncements that had figured so highly during the Investiture Dispute had died down by this point. Historian Gerd Tellenbach argues that, despite appearances, these years were "no longer marked by an atmosphere of bitter conflict".

This was in part the result of the papacy's realization that it could not win two different disputes on two separate fronts, as it had been trying to do. Calixtus had been personally involved in negotiations with the Emperor over the last decade, and his intimate knowledge of the delicate situation made him the perfect candidate for the attempt. The difference between 1119 and 1122, argues Stroll, was not Henry, who had been willing to make concessions in 1119, but Calixtus, who had then been intransigent, but who now was intent upon reaching an agreement".

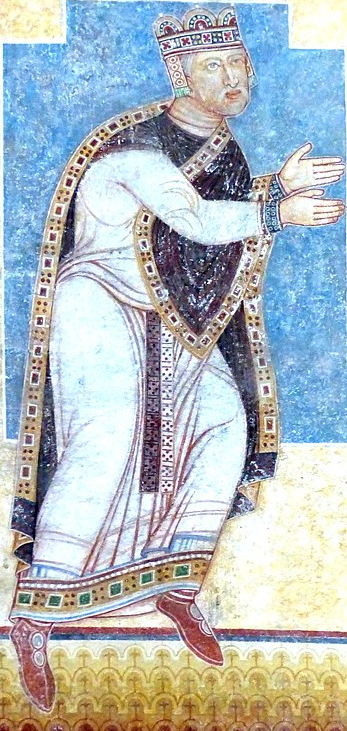
Henry V, Holy Roman Emperor

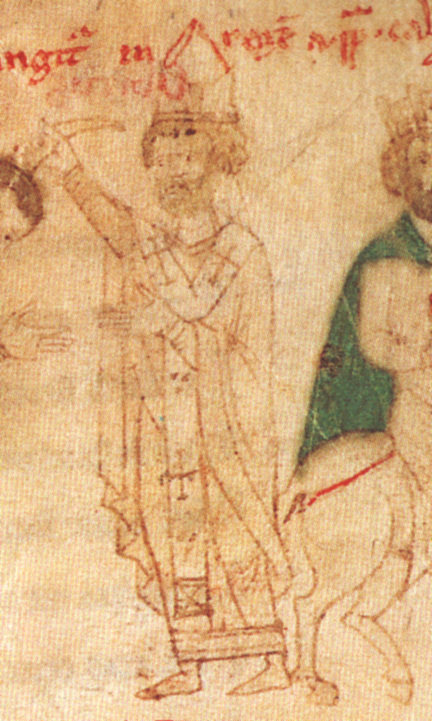
Calixtus II

The same sentiment prevailed in much of the German nobility. In 1121, pressured by a faction of nobles from the Lower Rhine and Duchy of Saxony under the leadership of Archbishop Adalbert I of Mainz, Henry agreed to submit to make peace with the pope. In response in February 1122, Calixtus wrote to Henry in a conciliatory tone via the bishop of Acqui. His letter has been described as "a carefully crafted overture".

In his letter, Calixtus drew attention to their blood relationship, suggesting that while their shared ancestry compelled them to love each other as brothers. It was fundamental that the German kings draw their authority from God's servants, not from God directly. However, Calixtus also emphasised for the first time that he blamed not Henry personally for the dispute but his bad advisors who had dictated unsound policy to him. In a major shift in policy since the Council of Reims of 1119, the pope stated that the church gifts what it possesses to all its children, without making claims upon them. This was intended to reassure Henry that in the event of peace between them, his position and Empire were secure.

Shifting from the practical to the spiritual, Calixtus next asked Henry to bear in mind that he was a king, but like all men limited on his earthly capability; he had armies, and kings below him, but the church had Christ and the Apostles. Continuing his theme, he referred, indirectly, to Henry's excommunication by himself (Note: Imposed on Henry's recognising the antipope, Gregory VIII.) (twice), he begged Henry to allow the conditions for peace to be created, as a result of which the church's, and God's glory would be increased, as concomitantly would the emperor's. Conversely, he made sure to include a threat: if Henry did not change his ways, Calixtus threatened to place "the protection of the church in the hands of wise men".

Historian Mary Stroll argues that, in taking this approach, Calixtus was taking advantage of the fact that, while he himself "was hardly in a position to sabre rattle" due to his military defeat in the Kingdom of Sicily and his difficulty with his own cardinals, Henry was also under pressure in Germany in both the military and spiritual spheres.

The emperor replied through the bishop of Speyer and the abbot of Fulda, who travelled to Rome and collected the pope's emissaries under the Cardinal Bishop of Ostia. Speyer was a representative of Henry's political opponents in Germany, whereas Fulda was a negotiator rather than politically partisan. Complicating matters was a disputed election to the diocese of Wurzburg in February 1122 of the kind that was at the heart of the Investiture Dispute. Although this almost led to an outbreak of civil war, a truce was arranged in August, allowing the parties to return to the papal negotiations.

In the summer of 1122, a synod was convened in Mainz, at which imperial emissaries concluded the terms of their agreement with representatives of the church. In a sign that the pope intended the impending negotiations to be successful, a Lateran council was announced for the following year.

== Worms ==
The Emperor received the papal legates in Worms with due ceremony, where he awaited the outcome of the negotiations which appear to have actually taken place in nearby Mainz, which was hostile territory to Henry. As such, he had to communicate via messenger to keep up with events. Abbot Ekkehard of Aura chronicles that discussions took over a week to conclude. On 8 September, he met the papal legates and their final agreements were codified for publication.

Although a possible compromise solution had already been received from England, this does not seem to have ever been considered in depth, probably on account of it containing an oath of Homage between emperor and pope, which had been a historical sticking point in earlier negotiations. The papal delegation was led by Cardinal Bishop Lamberto Scannabecchi of Ostia (the future Pope Honorius II).

Both sides studied previous negotiations between them, including those from 1111, which were considered to have created precedent. On 23 September 1122, papal and imperial delegates signed a series of documents outside the walls of Worms. There was insufficient room in the city for the number of attendees and watchers. Adalbert of Mainz wrote to Calixtus of how complex the negotiations had been, given that, as he said, Henry regarded the powers he was being asked to renounce as being hereditary in the Imperial throne. It is probable that what was eventually promulgated was the result of almost every word being carefully considered. The main difference between what was to be agreed at Worms and previous negotiations were the concessions from the pope.

== Concordat ==
The agreements come to at Worms were in the nature of both concessions and assurances to the other party. Henry, on oath before God, the apostles and the church renounced his right to invest bishops and abbots with ring and crosier, and opened ecclesiastical appointments in his realm to canonical elections, regno vel imperio. He also recognised the traditional extent and boundaries of the papal patrimony as a legal entity rather than one malleable to the emperor. Henry promised to return to the church those lands rightfully belonging to the church seized by himself or his father; furthermore, he would assist the pope in regaining those that were taken by others, and "he will do the same thing for all other churches and princes, both ecclesiastical and lay." If the pope requested Imperial assistance, he would receive it, and if the church came to the empire for justice, it would be treated fairly. He also swore to abstain from "all investiture by ring and staff," marking the end of an ancient imperial tradition.

Callixtus made similar reciprocal promises regarding the empire in Italy. He agreed to the presence of the emperor or his officials at the elections and granted the emperor the right to ajudge in the case of disputed outcomes on episcopal advice—as long as they had been held peacefully and without simony—which had officially been the case ever since precedent had been set by the London Accord of 1107. (Note: Here Archbishop Anselm of Canterbury conceded that "The King granted and commanded that from that time and henceforth no one should be invested in England with a bishopric or abbacy by the gift of the pastoral ring and staff from the royal or any lay hand", similarly to the Concordat of Worms.) This right to judge was constrained by an assurance that he would support the majority vote among electors, and further that he would take the advice of his other bishops before doing so. The emperor was also allowed to perform a separate ceremony in which he would invest bishops and abbots with their regalia, a sceptre representing the imperial lands associated with their episcopal see. (Note: The sceptre replaced the imperial ring and staff as symbols of the Emperor's authority. It had originally been proposed in 1111 and returned to in 1119, although vetoed by Calixtus.) This clause also contained a "cryptic" condition that once the elect had been so endowed, the new bishop "should do what he ought to do according to imperial rights". In the German imperial lands this was to take place prior to the bishop-elect's consecration; elsewhere in the empire—Burgundy and Italy, exempting the Papal States—within six months of the ceremony. The differentiating between the German portion of the Empire and the rest was of particular importance to Calixtus as the papacy had traditionally felt threatened more from it in the peninsular than the broader Empire. Finally, the pope granted "true peace" on the emperor and all those who had supported him. Calixtus had effectively overturned wholesale the strategy he had pursued during the Mouzon negotiation; episcopal investitures in Germany were to take place with very little substantive change in ceremony, while temporal involvement remained, only replacing investiture with homage, although the word itself—hominium—was studiously avoided. Adalbert, from whom Calixtus first received news of the final concordat, emphasized that it still had to be approved in Rome; this suggests, argues Stroll, that the archbishop—and probably the papal legation as a whole—were against making concessions to the emperor, and probably wanted Calixtus to disown the agreement. Adalbert believed the agreement would make it easier for the Emperor to legalise intimidation of episcopal electors, writing that "through the opportunity of [the emperor's] presence, the Church of God must undergo the same slavery as before, or an even more oppressive one".

"Let the church obtain what is of Christ, and let the emperor have what is his own" (Obtineat Aecclesia quod Christ est, habeat imperator quod suum est)

— Calixtus II to the Emperor Henry, 19 February 1122: MS 55 Stadtbibliothek Schaffhausen, 12th century, fol. 185v

However, argues Stroll, the concessions Calixtus made were an "excellent bargain" in return for eradicating the danger on the papacy's northern border and therefore allowing him to focus, without threat or distraction, on the Normans to the south. It had achieved its peace, argues Norman Cantor, by allowing local national custom and practice to determine future relations between crown and pope; in most cases, he notes, this "favored the continuance of royal control over the church".

The concordat was published as two distinct charters, each laying out the concessions the one party was making to the other. They are known respectively as the Papal (or the Calixtinum) and the Imperial (Henricianum) charters. Calixtus's is addressed to the emperor—in quite personal terms—while Henry's is made out to God. The bishop of Ostia gave the emperor the kiss of peace on behalf of the pope and said Mass. By these rites was Henry returned to the church, the negotiators were lauded for succeeding in their delicate mission and the concordat was called "peace at the will of the pope". Neither charter was signed; both contained probably intentional vagaries and unanswered questions—such as the position of the papacy's churches that lay outside both the patrimony and Germany—which were subsequently addressed on a case-by-case basis. Indeed, Robert Benson has suggested that the brevity of the charters was deliberate and that the agreement as a whole is as important for what it omits as for what it includes. The term regalia, for example, was not only undefined but literally meant two different things to each party. In the Henricianum it referred to the feudal duty owed to a monarch; in the Calixtinium, it was the episcopal temporalities. Broader question, such as the nature of the church and Empire relationship, were also not addressed, although some ambiguity was removed by an 1133 Papal privilege.

The Concordat was widely, and deliberately, publicised around Europe. Calixtus was not in Rome when the concordat was delivered. He had left the city by late August and was not to return until mid- to late October, making a progress to Anagni, taking the bishopric of Anagni and Casamari Abbey under his protection.

=== Agreements ===
Agreement of Calixtus II	Edict of Henry V
I, Calixtus, bishop, servant of the servants of God, do grant to thee, beloved son, Henry—by the grace of God emperor of the Romans, Augustus—that the elections of bishops and abbots of the German kingdom, who belong to that kingdom, shall take place in thy presence, without simony or any violence; so that if any dispute shall arise between the parties concerned, thou, with the counsel or judgment of the metropolitan and the coprovincial bishops, shalt give consent and aid to the party which has the more right. The one elected shall receive the regalia from thee by the scepter and shall perform his lawful duties to thee on that account. But he who is consecrated in the other parts of thy empire [i.e., Burgundy and Italy] shall, within six months, and without any exaction, receive the regalia from thee by the scepter, and shall perform his lawful duties to thee on that account (saving all rights which are known to belong to the Roman Church). Concerning matters in which thou shalt make complaint to me, and ask aid—I, according to the duty of my office, will furnish aid to thee. I give unto thee true peace, and to all who are or have been of thy party in this conflict.	In the name of the holy and indivisible Trinity I, Henry, by the grace of God emperor of the Romans, Augustus, for the love of God and of the Holy Roman Church and of our lord Pope Calixtus, and for the salvation of my soul, do surrender to God, and to the holy apostles of God, Peter and Paul, and to the Holy Catholic Church, all investiture through ring and staff; and do grant that in all the churches that are in my kingdom or empire there may be canonical election and free consecration. All the possessions and regalia of St. Peter which, from the beginning of this discord unto this day, whether in the time of my father or in mine have been seized, and which I hold, I restore to that same Holy Roman Church. And I will faithfully aid in the restoration of those things which I do not hold. The possessions also of all other churches and princes, and of all other persons lay and clerical which have been lost in that war: according to the counsel of the princes, or according to justice, I will restore, as far as I hold them; and I will faithfully aid in the restoration of those things which I do not hold. And I grant true peace to our lord Pope Calixtus, and to the Holy Roman Church, and to all those who are or have been on its side. And in matters where the Holy Roman Church shall ask aid I will grant it; and in matters concerning which it shall make complaint to me I will duly grant to it justice. All these things have been done by the consent and counsel of the princes. Whose names are here adjoined: Adalbert archbishop of Mainz; F. archbishop of Cologne; H. bishop of Ratisbon; O. bishop of Bamberg; B. bishop of Spires; H. of Augsburg; G. of Utrecht; Ou. of Constance; E. abbot of Fulda; Henry, duke; Frederick, duke; S. duke; Pertolf, duke; Margrave Teipold; Margrave Engelbert; Godfrey, count Palatine; Otto, count Palatine; Berengar, count. I, Frederick, archbishop of Cologne and arch-chancellor, have ratified this.

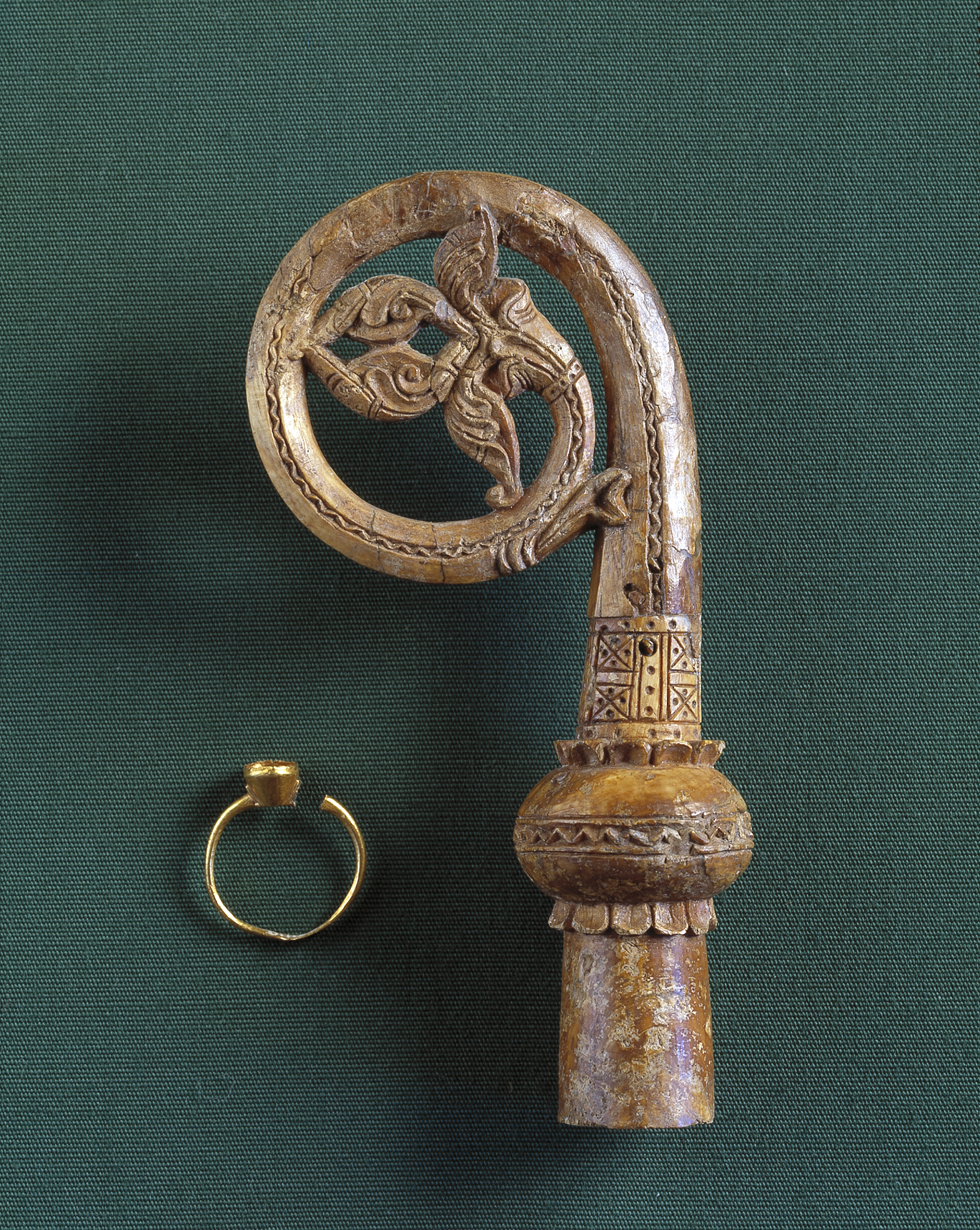
Henry V renounced his right to invest bishops and abbots with ring and crosier (pictured).

=== Preservation ===
The concordat was ratified at the First Council of the Lateran and the original Henricianum charter is preserved at the Vatican Apostolic Archive; the Calixtinum has not survived except in subsequent copies. A copy of the former is also held in the Codex Udalrici, but this is an abridged version for political circulation, as it reduces the number of imperial concessions made. Indicating the extent that he saw the agreement as a papal victory, Calixtus had a copy of the Henricianum painted on a Lateran Palace chamber wall; while nominally portraying the concordat as a victory for the papacy, it also ignored the numerous concessions made to the emperor. (Note: Reiterating the refrain of papal victory over schismatics, other imagery on the room's paintings included the antipopes acting as footstools—scabella—for the Roman popes.) This was part of what Hartmut Hoffmann has called "a conspiracy of silence" regarding papal concessions. Indeed, while the pope is pictured enthroned, and Henry only standing, the suggestion is still that they were jointly wielding their respective authority to come to this agreement. An English copy of the Calixtinum made by William of Malmesbury is reasonably accurate but omits the clause mentioning the use of a sceptre in the granting of the regalia. He then, having condemned Henry's "Teuton fury", proceeds to praise him, comparing him favourably to Charlemagne for his devotion to God and the peace of Christendom.

== Aftermath ==
The first invocation of the concordat was not in the empire, as it turned out, but by Henry I of England the following year. Following a long-running dispute between Canterbury and York which ended up in the Papal court, Joseph Huffman argues that it would have been controversial for the Pope "to justify one set of concessions in Germany and another in England". The concordat ended once and for all the "Imperial church system of the Ottonians and Salians". The First Lateran Council was convoked to confirm the Concordat of Worms. The council was more representative with nearly 300 bishops and 600 abbots from every part of Catholic Europe being present. It convened on March 18, 1123. One of its primary concerns was to emphasise the independence of diocesan clergy, and to do so it forbade monks to leave their monasteries to provide pastoral care, which would in future be the sole preserve of the diocese. In ratifying the Concordat, the Council confirmed that in future bishops would be elected by their clergy, although, also per the Concordat, the Emperor could refuse the homage of German bishops.

Decrees were passed directed against simony, concubinage among the clergy, church robbers, and forgers of Church documents; the council also reaffirmed indulgences for Crusaders. These, argues C. Colt Anderson "established important precedents in canon law restricting the influence of the laity and the monks". While this led to a busy period of reform, it was important for those advocating reform not to allow themselves to be confused with the myriad heretical sects and schismatics who were making similar criticisms.

The Concordat was the last major achievement for Emperor Henry, as he died in 1125; an attempted invasion of France came to nothing in 1124 in the face of "determined opposition". Fuhrmann comments that, as Henry had shown in his life "even less interest in new currents of thought and feeling than his father", he probably did not understand the significance of the events he had lived through. The peace only lasted until his death; when Imperial Electors met to choose his successor, reformists took the opportunity to attack the imperial gains of Worms on the grounds that they had been granted to him personally rather than Emperors generally. However, later emperors, such as Frederick I and Henry VI, continued to wield as much, if intangible, power as their predecessors in episcopal elections, and to a greater degree than that allowed them by Calixtus' charter. Successive emperors found the Concordat sufficiently favourable that it remained almost unaltered until the empire was dissolved by Francis II in 1806 on account of Napoleon. Popes, likewise, were able to use the powers codified to them in the Concordat their advantage in future internal disputes with their cardinals.

== Reception ==
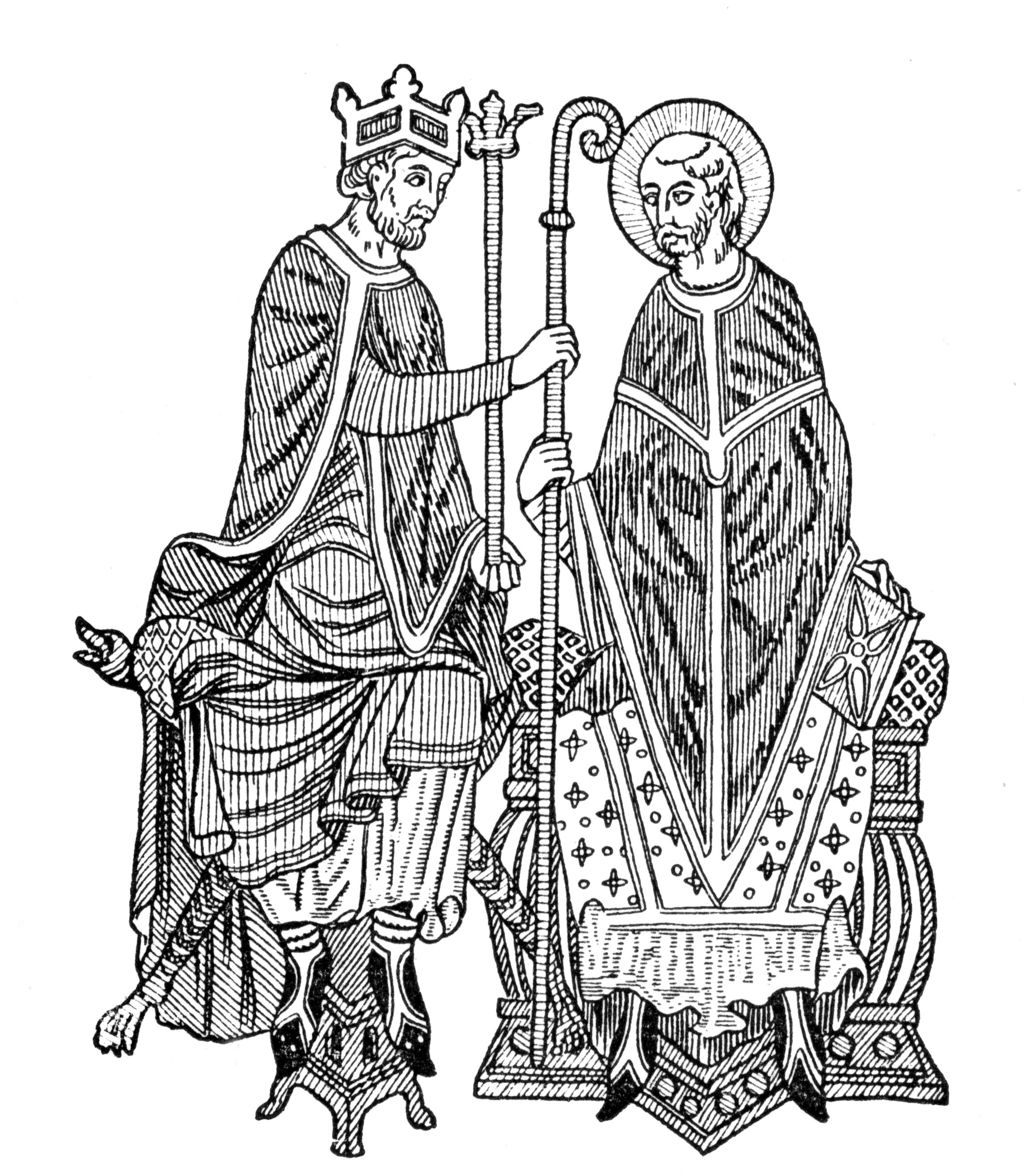
20th-century interpretation of a medieval king investing a bishop

The most detailed contemporary description of the Concordat comes to historians through a brief chronicle known as the 1125 continuation chronicle. This pro-papal document lays the blame for the schism squarely upon Henry—by his recognition of Gregory VIII—and the praise for ending it on Calixtus, through his making only temporary compromises. I. S. Robinson, writing in The New Cambridge Medieval History, suggests that this was a deliberate ploy to leave further negotiations open with a more politically malleable Emperor in future. To others it was not so clear cut; Honorius of Autun, for example, writing later in the century discussed lay investiture as an aspect of papal-Imperial relations and, even a century later the Sachsenspiegel still stated that Emperors nominated bishops in Germany. Robinson suggests that, by the end of the 12th century, "it was the imperial, rather than the papal version of the Concordat of Worms that was generally accepted by German churchmen".

The contemporary English historian William of Malmesbury praised the Concordat for curtailing what he perceived as the emperor's overreach, or as he put it, "severing the sprouting necks of Teuton fury with the axe of Apostolic power". However, he regarded the final settlement not as a defeat of the Empire at the hands of the church, but rather as a reconciliatory effort by the two powers. Although polemicism had died down in the years preceding the Concordat, it did not finish them completely, and factionalism within the church especially continued. Gerhoh of Reichersberg believed that the emperor now had the right to request German bishops pay homage to him, something that would never have been allowed under Paschal, due to the vague clause instructing newly-elects to the things the emperor wished. Gerhoh argued that now imperial intervention in episcopal elections had been curtailed, Henry would use this clause to extend his influence in the church by means of homage. Gerhoh was torn between viewing the concordat as the end of a long struggle between pope and empire, or whether it marked the beginning of a new one within the church itself. Likewise Adelbert of Mainz—who had casually criticised the agreement in his report to Calixtus—continued to lobby against it, and continued to bring complaints against Henry, whom, for example, he alleged had illegally removed the Bishop of Strassburg who was suspected of complicity in the death of Duke Berthold of Zaehringen. (Note: Adalbert was concerned, not with the possibility that the bishop had been involved in the murder of a senior member of the German nobility, but that Henry was claiming to have the power to remove him under powers supposedly granted him at Worms.)

The reformist party within the church took a similar view, criticising the Concordat for failing to remove all secular influence on the church. For this reason, a group of followers of Paschal II unsuccessfully attempted to prevent the agreement's ratification at the Lateran Council, crying non placet! when asked to do so: "it was only when it was pointed out that much had to be accepted for the sake of peace that the atmosphere quietened". Calixtus told them that they had "not to approve but tolerate" it. At a council in Bamberg in 1122 Henry gathered those nobles who had not attended the Concordat to seek their approval of the agreement, which they did. The following month he sent cordial letters to Calixtus agreeing with the pope's position that as brothers in Christ they were bound by God to work together, etc., and that he would soon visit personally to discuss the repatriation of papal land. These letters were, in turn, responded to positively by Calixtus, who instructed his delegates to make good the promises they had made at Worms.

=== Historiography ===
Gottfried Wilhelm Leibniz called the agreements made at Worms "the oldest concordat in German history, an international treaty", while Augustin Fliche argued that the Concordat effectively instituted the statutes of Ivo of Chartres, a prominent reformer in the early years of the Investiture Contest, a view, it has been suggested, that most historians agree with. The historian Uta-Renate Blumenthal writes that, despite its shortcomings, the Concordat freed "[the church and the Empire] from antiquated concepts with their increasingly anachronistic restrictions". According to the historian William Chester Jordan, the Concordat was "of enormous significance" because it demonstrated that the emperor, in spite of his great secular power, did not have any religious authority. On the other hand, argues Karl F. Morrison, any victory the papacy felt it had won was pyrrhic, as "the king was left in possession of the field". The new peace also now allowed the papacy to expand its territories in Italy, such as the Sabina, which were unobtainable while the dispute with Henry was ongoing, while in Germany, a new class of ecclesiastics was created, what Horst Fuhrmann calls the "ecclesiastical princes of the Empire".

While most historians agree that the Concordat marks a clear close to the fifty-year-old struggle between church and empire, disagreement continues on just how decisive a termination that was. Historians are also unclear as to the commitment of the pope to the concordat. Stroll, for example, notes that, while Henry's oaths were made to the church corporate, so in perpetuity, while Calixtus's may have been in a personal capacity. This, Stroll argues, would mean that it could be argued that while Henry's commitments to the church applied forever, Calixtus's applied only for the duration of Henry's reign, and at least one contemporary, Otto of Freising, wrote later in the century that he believed this to be the church's position. Stroll considers it "implausible" that Henry and his counsel would ever have entered into such a one-sided agreement. Indeed, John O'Malley has argued that the emperor had effectively been granted a veto from Calixtus; while in the strictest interpretation of the Gregorian reformers the only two important things in the making of a bishop were his election and consecration, Calixtus had effectively codified a role—however small—for the emperor in this process. Conversely, Benson reckons that while Henry's agreement was with the church in perpetuity, Calixtus'—based on the personal mode of address—was with him personally, and as such not binding on his successors. However, this was also an acknowledgement, he suggests, that much of what the pope did not address was already considered customary, and so did not need addressing.

There has also been disagreement in why the Investiture contest ended with the Concordat as it did. Benson notes that, as a truce, it was primarily intended to stop the fighting rather than to address its original causes. It was "a straightforward, political engagement... a pragmatic agreement" between two political bodies. Indeed, controversy over investiture continued for at least another decade; in that light, suggests Benson, it could be argued that the Concordat did not end the dispute at all. There were "many problems unsolved, and [it] left much room for the free play of power". Political scientist Bruce Bueno de Mesquita has argued that, in the long term, the Concordat was an essential component to the later—gradual—creation of the European nation state.

== See also ==
- The Diet of Worms of 1521
