= 1119 =

1119 in various calendars
- Gregorian calendar: 1119; MCXIX
- Ab urbe condita: 1872
- Armenian calendar: 568; ԹՎ ՇԿԸ
- Assyrian calendar: 5869
- Balinese saka calendar: 1040–1041
- Bengali calendar: 525–526
- Berber calendar: 2069
- English Regnal year: 19 Hen. 1 – 20 Hen. 1
- Buddhist calendar: 1663
- Burmese calendar: 481
- Byzantine calendar: 6627–6628
- Chinese calendar: 戊戌年 (Earth Dog); 3816 or 3609 — to — 己亥年 (Earth Pig); 3817 or 3610
- Coptic calendar: 835–836
- Discordian calendar: 2285
- Ethiopian calendar: 1111–1112
- Hebrew calendar: 4879–4880
- Hindu calendars
- Vikram Samvat: 1175–1176
- Shaka Samvat: 1040–1041
- Kali Yuga: 4219–4220
- Holocene calendar: 11119
- Igbo calendar: 119–120
- Iranian calendar: 497–498
- Islamic calendar: 512–513
- Japanese calendar: Gen'ei 2 (元永２年)
- Javanese calendar: 1024–1025
- Julian calendar: 1119; MCXIX
- Korean calendar: 3452
- Minguo calendar: 793 before ROC 民前793年
- Nanakshahi calendar: −349
- Seleucid era: 1430/1431 AG
- Thai solar calendar: 1661–1662
- Tibetan calendar: ས་ཕོ་ཁྱི་ལོ་ (male Earth-Dog); 1245 or 864 or 92 — to — ས་མོ་ཕག་ལོ་ (female Earth-Boar); 1246 or 865 or 93

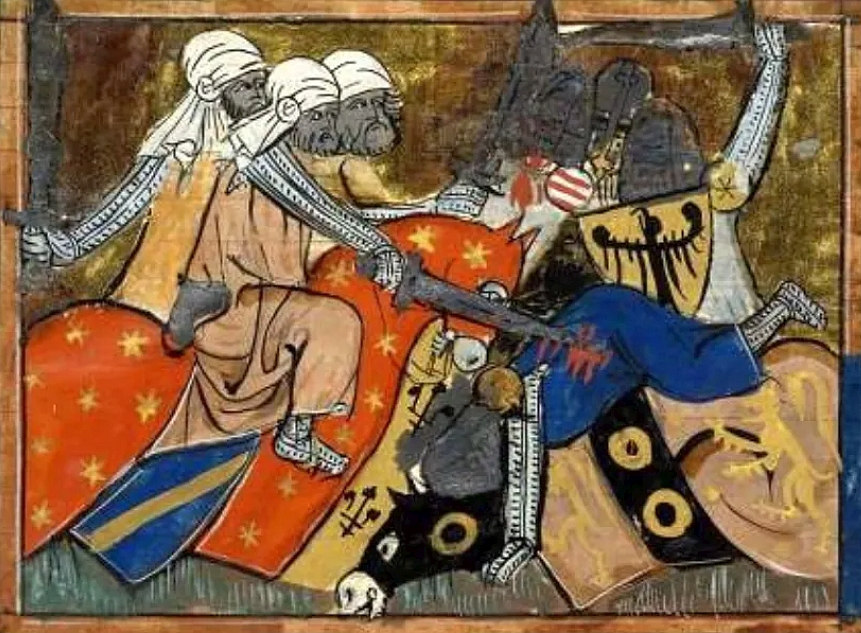
Battle of Ager Sanguinis: Count Roger of Salerno is killed by Muslim forces (1337)

Year 1119 (MCXIX) was a common year starting on Wednesday of the Julian calendar.

== Events ==
=== By place ===
==== Levant ====
- June 28 – Battle of Ager Sanguinis: The Crusader army of the Principality of Antioch under Roger of Salerno is ambushed and annihilated near Sarmada by the combined Muslim forces (20,000 men) of Ilghazi, the Artuqid ruler of Aleppo. Muslim troops are sent to raid the suburbs of Antioch and sack the port of Saint Symeon. The Crusader fortresses at Atarib, Zardana, Sarmin, Ma'arrat al-Nu'man and Kafr Tab are captured. Ilghazi makes a triumphant entry at Aleppo, Crusader prisoners are dragged in chains – where they are tortured to death in the streets. The massacre leads to the name of the battle, Ager Sanguinis (or "the Field of Blood").
- August 14 – Battle of Hab: The Crusaders under King Baldwin II of Jerusalem (supported by forces of Pons, Count of Tripoli) defeat Ilghazi's army at Ariha in Syria. Baldwin manages to re-capture all of the Crusader castles and returns to Antioch in triumph. He stabilizes the frontiers and prevents Ilghazi from marching on Antioch.

=== Europe ===
- August 20 – Battle of Brémule: King Henry I of England defeats King Louis VI ("the Fat") of France and his 400 knights in Normandy. A skirmish that begins with the French launching a fierce but disordered attack, and ends with the French turning tail. Louis agrees to make peace and formally recognizes William Adelin as duke of Normandy.

=== England ===
- Robert de Brus, 1st Lord of Annandale, grants and confirms the church of St. Hilda of Middlesbrough to Whitby.
- September 19 – A severe earthquake hits Gloucestershire and Warwickshire.

=== By topic ===
==== Religion ====
- January 29 – Pope Gelasius II dies in exile after a 1-year pontificate at the Abbey of Cluny. He is succeeded by Callixtus II as the 162nd pope of the Catholic Church.
- March – Olegarius Bonestruga, archbishop of Tarragona, preaches successfully a Crusade against the Moors in Catalonia.
- Council of Toulouse: The Catholic Church condemned anyone who denied the Eucharist, infant baptism, ordination of priests, and lawful marriage as a heretic.
- Council of Reims: The Catholic Church condemned those who have seized ecclesiastical property, prohibited charging a fee for burial or sacrament, banned priests, deacons and sub-deacons from having wives or mistresses, condemned simony, and reaffirmed Emperor Henry V's excommunication.

==== Technology ====
- Zhu Yu, a Chinese historian, publishes his book Pingzhou Table Talks, describing the earliest known use of bulkheads to provide separate hull compartments in ships. Zhu Yu's book is also the first to report the use of a magnetic compass for navigation at sea. (The first actual description, however, of the magnetic compass is by another Chinese writer Shen Kuo in his Dream Pool Essays, published in 1088.)
- The Two Towers in Bologna are completed.

== Births ==
- February 28 – Xi Zong, Chinese emperor (d. 1150)
- July 7 – Sutoku, Japanese emperor (d. 1164)
- Ahmed-Al-Kabeer, Arab Sufi teacher (d. 1182)
- Aldebrandus, bishop of Fossombrone (d. 1219)
- Matthias I, duke of Lorraine (approximate date)
- Tancred, Norman nobleman (approximate date)
- William de Warenne, 3rd Earl of Surrey (d. 1148)

== Deaths ==
- January 29 – Gelasius II, pope of the Catholic Church
- February – Geoffrey de Clive, English bishop
- March 10 – Muirchertach Ua Briain, Irish king of Munster
- March 29 – Peter de Honestis, Lombard monk
- June 20 – Henry de Beaumont, 1st Earl of Warwick, Norman nobleman
- June 27 – Herwig of Meissen, German bishop
- June 28 – Roger of Salerno, Norman nobleman
- July 17 – Baldwin VII, count of Flanders (b. 1093)
- July 22 – Herbert de Losinga, English bishop
- August 4 – Landulf II, archbishop of Benevento
- August – Robert the Leper, French nobleman in the Principality of Antioch, executed
- September 13 – Gleb Vseslavich, Kievan prince
- October 13 – Alan IV, duke of Brittany (b. 1063)
- Aedh Ua Con Ceannainn, king of Uí Díarmata
- Ibn Aqil, Persian Islamic theologian and jurist (b. 1040)
- Johannes of Jerusalem, French abbot (b. 1042)
- Wang Ximeng, Chinese painter (b. 1096)
