= Crusading warfare =

Crusading warfare, characterised by distinctive systems of recruitment, logistics, and strategy, formed a central element of the crusading movement from its origins in the late 11th century.

== Background ==
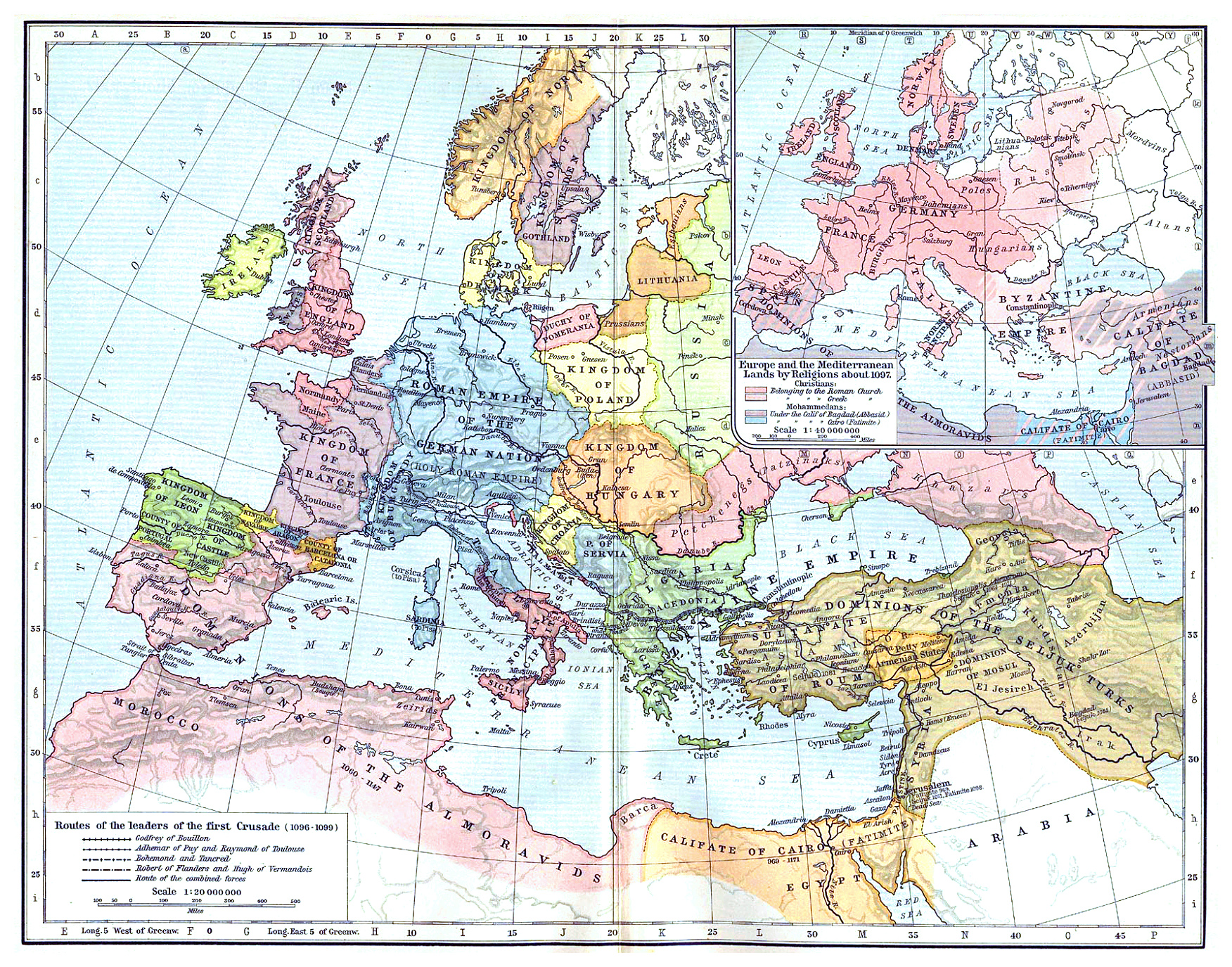
Europe c. 1097

The crusading movement began with Pope Urban II's call at the Council of Clermont on 27 November 1095 for a military expedition to protect eastern Christians against the Muslim Seljuk Turks. In this period, the character of warfare in Western Europe was conditioned by the primacy of land as the chief source of wealth, by the limited capacity of governmental structures, by technological constraints that generally favoured defence over assault, and by geography and climate. Urban's scheme was unprecedented: he proclaimed a holy war sanctioned by God and offered spiritual rewards to those who took up arms in due devotion. His critic, Sigebert of Gembloux, quickly perceived that he aimed to turn a secular host (militia mundi) into an army of God (militia Dei).

By the late 11th century, the papacy had strengthened its supremacy in Western Christendom through the Gregorian Reform, a radical programme intended to free the Church from lay control. Because secular rulers had long asserted the right to invest candidates with ecclesiastical office, these reforms provoked acute tensions between ecclesiastical and secular authority, most notably in the Investiture Controversy. Reformist popes such as Leo IX and Gregory VII mustered armed forces against their opponents or against Muslim rulers in Iberia and Sicily, thereby stimulating renewed interest in the Christian theology of war. Its foundations lay in the teaching of the late Roman theologian Augustine, who held that armed conflict might constitute a just war when proclaimed by legitimate authority for a rightful cause—such as defence or the recovery of seized property—waged with due restraint and undertaken only once all peaceful measures had proved unavailing. Under the reforming papacy, theologians further argued that the pope, as God's representative on earth, could lawfully sanction wars, and that those who fought with proper intent performed an act of love.

Western Christendom comprised a patchwork of states. The Holy Roman Empire and France, both heirs to the fragmented Carolingian Empire, were themselves divided into a range of lesser polities, including Normandy, Flanders and Anjou in France, and the German duchies of Saxony and Bavaria. These Carolingian successor realms were bordered by other Catholic states, including England, Denmark, Poland, Hungary, Sicily, Aragon and León-Castile. After the collapse of the Carolingian Empire, a new and socially diverse military elite appeared, drawn both from established noble families and from fighters of lower status. These heavily armoured mounted warriors, known as knights, fought in close-order groups that fostered cohesion. Clerical guidance helped shape their collective ethos, later known as chivalry, as church leaders sought to direct their violence towards defending the faith and protecting the defenceless. In the Mediterranean, society remained more urban in character, and the revival of long-distance trade in the early 11th century fostered the growth of cities such as Venice, Pisa, Genoa, and Marseilles.

On the eve of the First Crusade, the Islamic world was effectively split among three main powers. The Maghreb and al-Andalus (Muslim Spain) were controlled by the Sunni fundamentalist Almoravids. Egypt and parts of Syria were governed by the Fatimid Caliphate, a Shi'ite dynasty. From Central Asia to the Middle East stretched the Seljuk Empire, whose sultans accepted the Sunni Abbasid caliphs' nominal authority. They presided over a fragmented realm in which Seljuk princes, Turkoman warlords, and Arab chieftains often acted as rivals rather than subordinates. The migration of nomadic Turkomans from Central Asia into the Middle East had begun under the loose oversight of Seljuk leaders in the mid-11th century. Their influx caused major upheaval and forced the Byzantine Empire to withdraw from Anatolia, hitherto a key source of military manpower. The Turkoman incursions hastened the Armenians' flight from their homeland to other regions, notably Cilicia, where they established semi-independent lordships. Because the Armenian Church rejected the teachings of the Council of Chalcedon (451), both the Byzantines and Western Christians regarded it as heretical.

The Byzantines had long been the leading Christian power in the eastern Mediterranean, but by the late 11th century they were also losing ground in Europe to foes such as the nomadic Pechenegs and the Italian Normans. Doctrinal and liturgical differences had already strained relations between the Byzantine Church and the papacy, and, despite attempts at reconciliation, mutual excommunications in 1054 produced a formal schism between Eastern (Orthodox) and Western (Catholic) Christianity. Even so, the Byzantine emperors maintained contact with the west in the hope of securing military aid against their adversaries. In eastern Europe, the Rus' principalities, including Novgorod and Polotsk, remained centres of Orthodox Christianity, controlling key trade routes. To their west lay the Baltic lands, inhabited by pagan Finnic, Baltic, and Slavic groups who sustained varying degrees of contact with their Catholic and Orthodox neighbours.

== Crusading movement ==
=== First Crusade ===
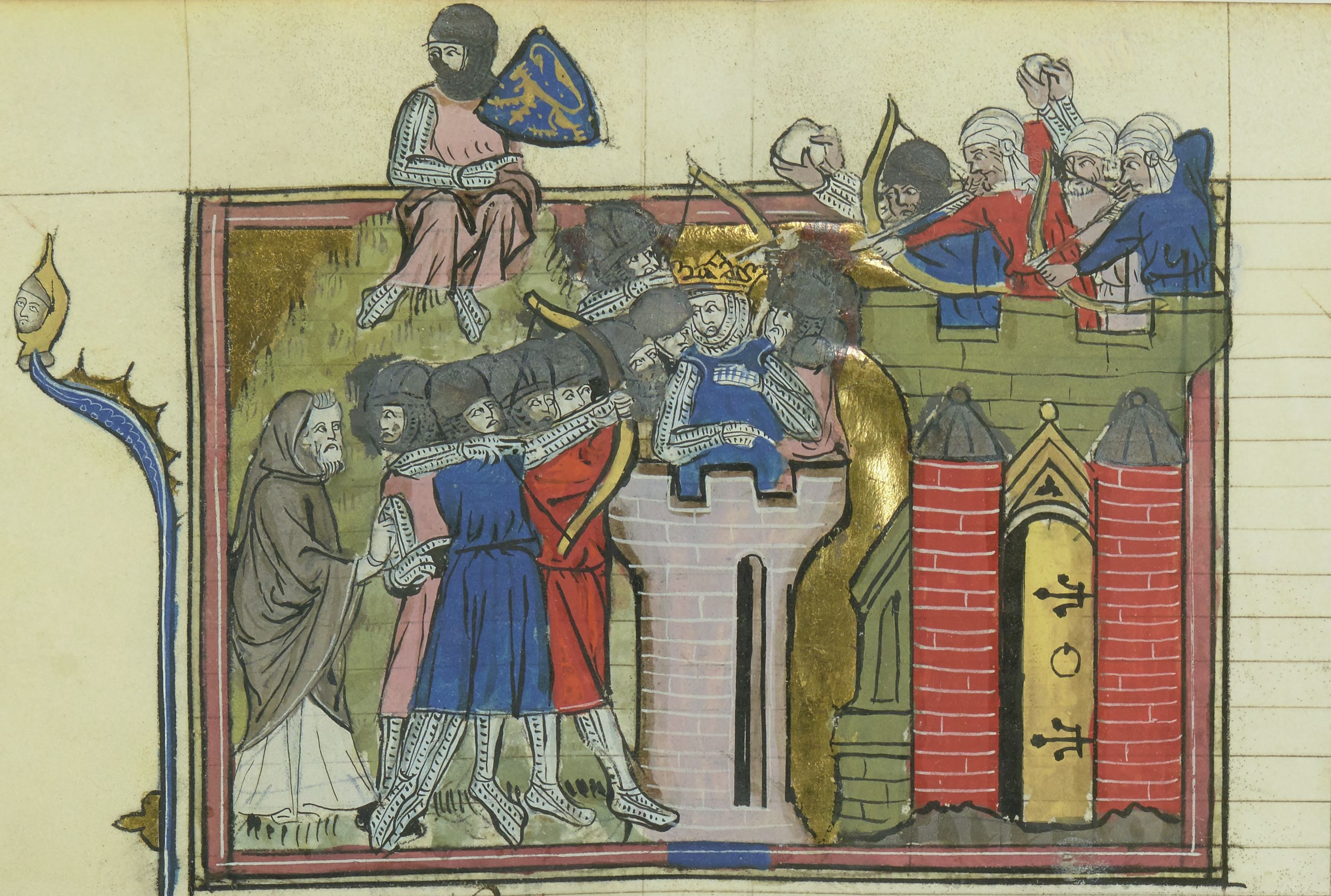
Siege of Jerusalem during the First Crusade (a miniature from a 14th-century chronicle about the Crusades)

Pope Urban's call for the liberation of the Holy City of Jerusalem generated widespread enthusiasm across medieval society, mobilising not only knights but also thousands of unarmed commoners. The early popular contingents departed prematurely in 1096, perpetrating anti-Jewish violence in Central Europe and suffering catastrophic losses. Many never reached Anatolia, and those who did were annihilated by Turkoman forces at the Battle of Civetot.

The main knightly armies left later in 1096 under leaders such as Godfrey of Bouillon, Raymond of Saint-Gilles, and Bohemond of Taranto. In cooperation with Byzantium they secured major victories over Turkoman forces at Nicaea, Dorylaeum, and Antioch. They captured Jerusalem on 15 July 1099 and defeated a Fatimid army at Ascalon shortly afterwards. Although they had pledged to return conquered lands to the Byzantines, the crusaders established their own principalities: the County of Edessa, the Principality of Antioch, and the Kingdom of Jerusalem.

=== Broadening ===
Over time, crusading became a progressively institutionalised enterprise with distinctive privileges—especially the crusade indulgence—and with increasingly organised methods of financing, preaching, and recruitment. Pope Urban II had already set a precedent for regional crusading by granting spiritual rewards to Iberian Christians fighting for the city of Tarragona. Success in the Levant inspired new expeditions, including the Crusade of 1101 and the creation of the County of Tripoli with help from Italian maritime powers.

A crucial development was the rise of the military orders. These monastic communities combined the traditional vows of poverty, chastity, and obedience with a commitment to defend Christendom. The Knights Templar, founded c. 1119 under Hugues de Payens, were the first–the influential Cistercian abbot Bernard of Clairvaux shaped their rule and secured papal endorsement. The Knights Hospitaller, originally a charitable institution, assumed military functions during the 1130s.

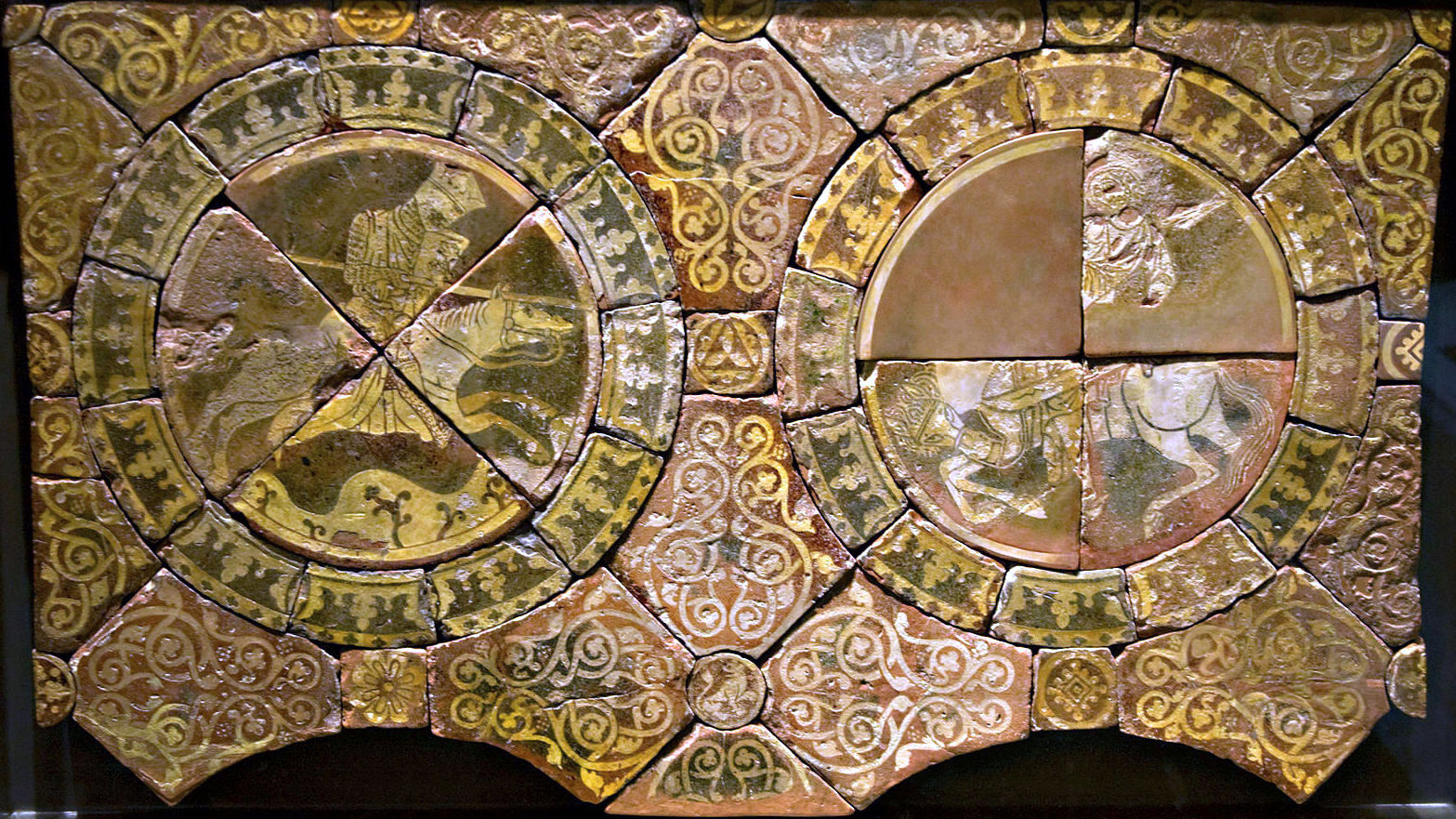
Richard I of England and Saladin (lead-gazed tiles from Chertsey Abbey, England, mid-13th century)

The fall of Edessa to the Turkoman ruler Zengi in 1144 prompted the Second Crusade, led by Conrad III of Germany and Louis VII of France. Pope Eugene III, influenced by Bernard of Clairvaux, extended crusading privileges to campaigns against the pagan Wends, launching the Northern Crusades. The expedition's failure weakened crusading enthusiasm and facilitated the unification of Muslim Syria and Egypt under the Kurdish commander Saladin. His victory over the Jerusalemite army at the Battle of Hattin in 1187 enabled the rapid conquest of most Crusader territories. The Third Crusade, led by Richard I of England and Philip II of France, restored parts of the coast but not Jerusalem. German knights remaining in the Holy Land after the crusade founded the new military order of the Teutonic Knights.

From the late 12th century, crusading was also directed against Christian rulers, including Alfonso IX of León and Markward of Anweiler. The diversion of the Fourth Crusade to Constantinople in 1203 created the Latin Empire on former Byzantine lands. In 1209 Pope Innocent III launched the Albigensian Crusades against the Cathars, a dualist movement rejecting papal authority. In Iberia, the crusaders' victory at the Battle of Las Navas de Tolosa (1213) proved decisive, yet Levantine crusades fared poorly: the Fifth Crusade failed in Egypt (1221); the Sixth regained Jerusalem, by negotiation, only temporarily; and the Seventh and Eighth Crusades by Louis IX of France ended in defeat.

=== Later Crusades ===
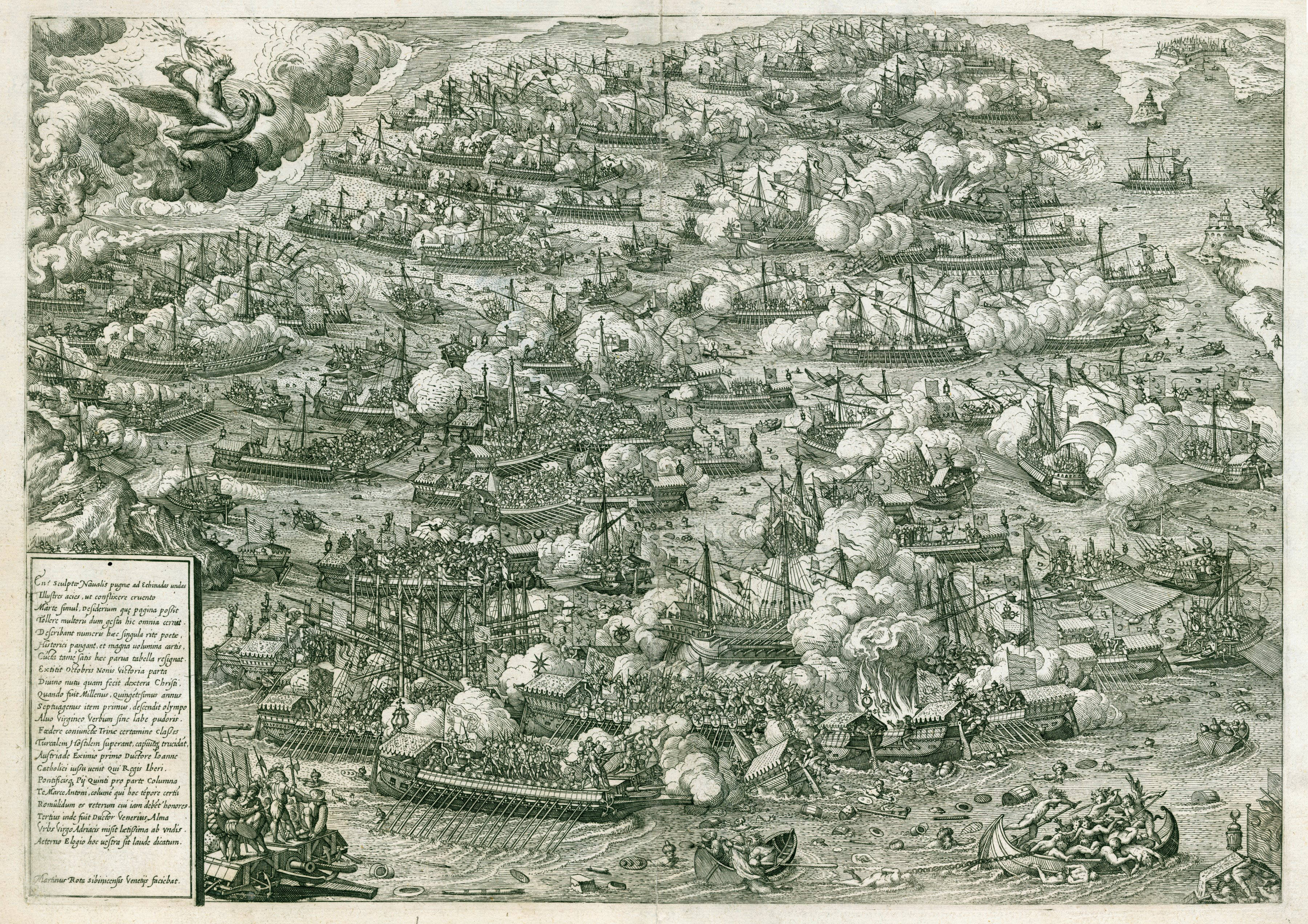
Battle of Lepanto (1571): Holy League victory over the Ottomans (an engraving by Martin Rota, 1572)

After defeating the Mongols in the 1260s, the Mamluk Sultanate became the leading Muslim power in the Middle East and by 1291 ended the Crusader states. Their fall inspired plans to recover the Holy Land, but no major expeditions followed as papal authority declined amid conflict with France and subsequent French control of the Avignon Papacy. Anti-Muslim crusading instead continued in the Mediterranean and southeastern Europe through "holy leagues" against Muslim pirates and, from the late 14th century, the Ottoman Empire. In Iberia, crusading ended in 1492 with the capture of the Emirate of Granada.

In the Baltic, the Teutonic Knights led anti-pagan warfare from the mid-13th century, conquering Prussia and Livonia and forming an order state. As the Preussenreisen ("journeys to Prussia") became a fashionable knightly pursuit from c. 1300, crusaders across Catholic Europe joined their campaigns. Lithuania's conversion after 1386 removed the Northern Crusades' ideological basis. During the Reformation, Prussia (1525) and Livonia (1561) were secularised.

Crusade indulgences were sometimes granted to the papacy's political foes, including rebellious Sicilians and their Aragonese allies after the Sicilian Vespers. Groups rejecting core Catholic doctrine also faced crusading campaigns, such as the Hussites in Bohemia. Papally sanctioned warfare against the Ottomans continued into the late 17th century.

== Recruitment ==
Crusading armies, such like other medieval hosts, as the historian Christopher Tyerman notes, were "recruited through a combination of enthusiasm, loyalty, ambition, coercion and cash". The practical responsibilities of recruiting and command generally rested with local magnates and regional elites. Persons of status or professional expertise served on negotiated terms, while their subordinates were obliged to follow. Although nominally voluntary, crusading in practice relied on dense networks of vassalage, kinship, regional identity, communal ties, hierarchy, and the attractions of pay, advancement, and material gain.

Recruiting men for long marches, often over 4,000 kilometres (2,500 mi), required clear and persuasive reasoning. Urban II presented the expedition as praelia sancta, a holy war ordered by God. This view was expressed in the cry Deus vult ("God wills it"), which the crowd reportedly repeated after his speech at Clermont. From c. 1150, papal governments shaped by canon lawyers developed more formal legal arguments. One of these figures, Innocent III, described the Holy Land as a Christian territory secured by Christ's sacrifice and wrongfully taken by Muslims, as set out in the bull Quia maior. Crusades against Christian groups were justified as necessary to restore peace. Pagans themselves were treated as lying outside natural law and thus as legitimate targets for conquest. The idea of vengeance—for seized Christian lands, the suffering of Christians, and the killing of crusaders—appeared early in First Crusade narratives and in the letters of Bernard of Clairvaux.

== Logistics ==
From its very beginnings, crusading was distinguished from most military campaigns of the age by the coordinated mobilisation of action across extensive regions. The particulars of major expeditions were publicly debated at assemblies, such as those at Vézelay and Speyer before the Second Crusade, and the leaders' council at Soissons preceding the Fourth. Crusading forces commonly travelled along established commercial and pilgrimage routes, and preparations frequently entailed sending envoys or scouts to survey the theatre of operations, as in the cases of the German Godfrey of Wiesenbach and Henry of Dietz, and the English Richard Barre on the eve of the Third Crusade. The diversion of the Fourth Crusade prompted Pope Innocent III to assume direct responsibility for strategic and logistical planning at the Fourth Lateran Council in 1215. This established a precedent for the First Council of Lyon under Innocent IV in 1245 and for Gregory X's convocation of the Second Council of Lyon in 1274. Papal oversight of crusading, however, was limited, as shown by the campaigns initiated by German prelates and townsfolk against Livonia without papal sanction.

== Enemies ==
=== Fatimids ===
At the advent of the First Crusade, the Fatimid army—over 20,000 strong—was the largest standing force in the Middle East. Campaign strength could be increased with auxiliaries and volunteers, though garrison needs usually limited the field army against the Crusader states to about 12,000 men. The cavalry consisted largely of Christian Armenians, armed with spear or javelin, sword, mace or axe, and dagger. Armour, including mail hauberks and lamellar cuirasses, was produced in state workshops. Despite papal bans on trade, the Fatimids continued to procure arms from Italian merchants. Although well equipped, their cavalry generally displayed lower morale than their Frankish counterparts. Fatimid armies were regularly supported by light cavalry, chiefly Turkoman auxiliaries supplied by Syrian rulers such as Toghtekin of Damascus. Limited pastureland curtailed the deployment of large Turkoman contingents, leading the Fatimids to employ Bedouin light cavalry, who were notorious for attacking the losing side—occasionally even their employers—after battle.

Infantry recruitment drew mainly on enslaved soldiers and mercenaries from sub-Saharan Africa, the Sudānī, some Christian or adherents of traditional religions; Armenian and Frankish slaves also served as foot soldiers. Black troops seldom attained high rank, and contemporary writers—most notably Usama ibn Munqidh—often voiced racially charged criticisms of their military qualities. Rivalries between infantry units stationed in different quarters of Cairo, such as the Rayhānīya and Juyūshī, could erupt into violent clashes with significant casualties. Infantry were typically armed with bows, maces, cudgels, pikes, and swords. Lightly armoured troops occupied the centre and were often deployed to disrupt Crusader charges. Behind them stood spearmen and archers, the former kneeling to allow the latter an unobstructed field of fire. Heavy cavalry advanced through gaps in the infantry line, supported by light cavalry positioned on the flanks or rear. The Fatimid fleet was mainly manned with sailors from Sicily and Libya along with Berber and Arab troops.

=== Syrian Muslim states ===
The forces of the Syrian Muslim states were drawn chiefly from the nomadic Turkomans, a group viewed with both fear and disdain by the settled population. They were primarily lightly armoured, highly mobile mounted archers, riding small ponies and trained to harry enemy formations or conduct disruptive cross-border raids, though elite contingents of heavily armoured cavalry were also fielded. In contrast to their sedentary neighbours, Turkoman society maintained no firm distinction between warrior and civilian: most herdsmen were expected to fight at need. Although nomadic manpower was abundant, such forces could rarely be held together for extended campaigns, as they tended to disperse once successful operations had concluded. Syrian Muslim armies comprised permanent 'askar units—Turkoman and Kurdish alike—supplemented by hired mercenaries. The Kurds, in particular, enjoyed a reputation for exceptional swordsmanship. Increasing contact with heavily armoured Western knights enhanced the importance of the elite cavalry by the late 12th century.

== Bibliography ==
- Backman, Clifford R. (2022) [2009]. The Worlds of Medieval Europe (Fourth ed.). Oxford University Press. ISBN 978-0-1975-7153-8.
- Barber, Malcolm (2004) [1992]. The Two Cities: Medieval Europe 1050–1320 (Second ed.). Routledge. ISBN 978-0-4151-7415-2.
- Christiansen, Eric (1997) [1980]. The Northern Crusades (Second ed.). Penguin Books. ISBN 978-0-14-026653-5.
- France, John (1999). Western Warfare in the Age of the Crusades, 1000–1300. Cornell University Press. ISBN 978-0-8014-3671-0.
- Holt, P. M. (2004). The Crusader States and their Neighbours. Pearson Education. ISBN 978-0-5823-6931-3.
- Irwin, Robert (2002) [1999]. "Islam and the Crusades, 1096–1699". In Riley-Smith, Jonathan (ed.). The Oxford History of the Crusades. Oxford University Press. pp. 211–257. ISBN 978-0-1928-0312-2.
- Jaspert, Nikolas (2006) [2003]. The Crusades. Routledge. ISBN 978-0-4153-5968-9.
- Jotischky, Andrew (2017) [2004]. Crusading and the Crusader States (Second ed.). Routledge. ISBN 978-1-1388-0806-5.
- Lloyd, Simon (2002) [1999]. "The Crusading Movement, 1096–1274". In Riley-Smith, Jonathan (ed.). The Oxford History of the Crusades. Oxford University Press. pp. 35–67. ISBN 978-0-1928-0312-2.
- Lock, Peter (2006). The Routledge Companion to the Crusades. Routledge Companions to History. Routledge. doi:10.4324/9780203389638. ISBN 978-0-415-39312-6.
- Madden, Thomas F. (2013). The Concise History of the Crusades. Critical Issues in World and International History (Third ed.). Rowman & Littlefield. ISBN 978-1-4422-1575-7.
- Nicolle, David (1996). Christian Europe and its Neighbours. Medieval Warfare Source Book. Vol. 2. Arms and Armour Press. ISBN 978-1-85409-307-3.
- Phillips, Jonathan (2014) [2002]. The Crusades, 1095–1204. Seminar Studies (Second ed.). Routledge. ISBN 978-1-4058-7293-5.
- Tibble, Steve (2020) [2018]. The Crusader Armies. Yale University Press. ISBN 978-0-3002-5322-1.
- Tyerman, Christopher (2015). How to Plan a Crusade. Penguin Books. ISBN 978-0-2419-5465-2.
