= Council of Reims =

Series of church councils held in Reims, France

Reims, located in the north-east of modern France, hosted several councils or synods in the Roman Catholic Church. These councils did not universally represent the church and are not counted among the official ecumenical councils.

== Early synodal councils of Reims ==
- The first synod, said to have been held at Reims by Archbishop Sonnatius between 624 and 630, is probably identical with that held at Clichy (Clippiacum) in 626 or 627.
- In 813 Archbishop Wulfar presided at a synod of reform (Werminghoff in "Mon. Germ. Hist.: Concilia aevi Carol. I", I, Hanover, 1904, 253 sq.).

== Council of Reims, 991 ==
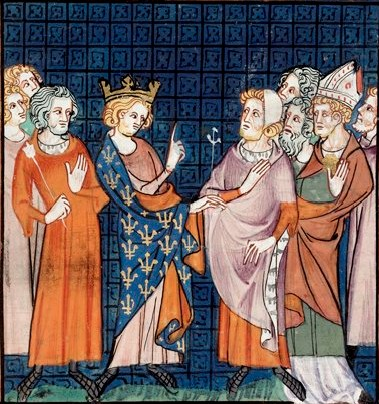
Arnulf, Archbishop of Reims at the Council of Reim, 991

A council, usually called the Synod of St-Basle, was convoked at Reims by King Hugues Capet, assisted by Gerbert of Aurillac, later Pope Sylvester II, to consider the case of Arnulf, Archbishop of Reims, illegitimate son of the late King Lothair. Arnulf was accused of conspiring with his uncle, Charles, Duke of Lower Lorraine, against Hugh Capet. He was duly deposed by the council, and Gerbert appointed in his place. This was done without the approval of Pope John XV, who refused to accept either Arnulf's removal or Gerbert's appointment. The matter dragged on until 995 when Arnulf was restored, and was only completely resolved by Pope Gregory V in 997. In a book written in the 1890s, by Alonzo T Jones, it is stated of the Council of Rheims in 991, the papacy is declared to be "the man of sin, the mystery of iniquity". Taken from The Consecrated Way to Christian Perfection, pp 105 Glad Tidings Publishers; Berrien Springs, MI. Copyright 2003 ISBN 1-931218-68-4 wherein this subject is vastly expounded upon.

== Council of Reims, 1049 ==
In 1049 Pope Leo IX was invited to be present at the consecration of the church of Abbey of Saint-Remi at Reims. He accepted the invitation and announced that he would at the same time hold a council. This irritated King Henry I of France, since it was generally held that no pope could hold a council in Kingdom of France without first consulting the king, which Leo IX had neglected to do. Consequently, in order to frustrate Leo IX, Henry I ordered all of his vassals to attend a feudal levy at the very time that the council was to be held. This placed the bishops and abbots in France in a very difficult position: they were ordered by Leo IX to attend the council; they were ordered by Henry I to attend the levy. Henry I hoped that his action would prevent the holding of the council, but Leo IX went on with his preparations without paying any attention to Henry I's act. The council was held at the appointed time, and in addition to churchmen from other lands about one-third of the bishops and abbots from the king's territory attended. Those who were absent with Henry I were excommunicated by Leo IX. Then Leo IX took up cases of simony and other ecclesiastical crimes which were reported. Several of those who were present at the council and held high offices in the church were accused of very serious offenses. Leo IX did not push any of them to an extreme, even when the guilt seemed definitely known, but adjourned all of the cases to his own court at Rome. Leo IX acted in the same way with regard to the accusations made against the great nobles. By this policy Leo IX hoped to have the authority of the papacy fully recognized. He was able to accomplish so much because of the weakness of the French monarchy. Leo IX was aided by Henry III, Holy Roman Emperor, in other attempts at reform, with whom he worked apparently in complete concord. Leo IX died in 1054 without having an opportunity to see the full effect of his act which had done so much to strengthen the power of the papacy.

Three canons of this council were legislated about simony. Hugo of Breteuil, bishop of Langres, was accused of simony and extortion, fled the proceedings, was deposed, and excommunicated. According to Eamon Duffy, "In one week, Leo had asserted papal authority, as it had never been asserted before".

The Council excommunicated Geoffrey II, Count of Anjou, for the imprisonment of Gervais de Château-du-Loir, bishop of Le Mans.

The Council had a dogmatic declaration about the primacy of the Bishop of Rome: "declaratum est quod solus Romanae sedis pontifex universalis Ecclesiae Primas esset et Apostolicus (It was declared that only the pontiff of the Roman see is the Primate of the universal Church and the Apostolic [Lord])."

== 12th century ==
- In 1115, a synod was held at which the cardinal legate Cuno of Praeneste excommunicated Emperor Henry V.
- In 1119, Pope Callixtus II convened a synod for the purpose of concluding peace with Henry V. Fifteen archbishops, over two hundred bishops, and as many abbots were present.
- In 1131, a Council of Reims met under the presidency of Pope Innocent II, who was in exile from Rome.
- Council of Reims (1148)

== Later councils ==
- In 1164 Pope Alexander III presided at a synod which urged the crusade against Holy Roman Emperor Frederick I.
- In 1407 Archbishop Guido III convened a synod to abolish the abuses that had crept into the Church of Reims during the Western Schism.
- In 1528 Archbishop Robert III held a synod against Martin Luther.
- In 1564 Cardinal Charles of Lorraine convened a reformatory synod to enforce the Tridentine Council decrees.
- In 1583 Cardinal Francis of Guise held a synod at which 27 reformatory decrees were enacted.
- After a lapse of almost three centuries Cardinal Gousset, Archbishop of Reims, convoked a synod at Soissons in 1849; another, at Amiens in 1853; a third, at Reims itself in 1857. The acts of the last three synods are printed in "Collectio Lacensis", IV, 91-246.
