= Hugh of Langres =

Bishop in 11th century France

Hugh of Langres (died 1050) was bishop of Langres.

As a theologian, he wrote a work, De corpore et sanguine Christi, against Berengar of Tours. He had met Berengar and discussed his views at length.

At the Council of Rheims (1049) he was accused of a range of crimes. One defender, Hugh of Besançon, rose but didn't speak. Another, Halinard of Lyon, mitigated the charges, saying Hugh of Langres was guilty of simony and extortion, but not the other matters. Hugh fled the council, was deposed and excommunicated, went to Rome in 1050 to confess, and died on his way back to France.
