= Council of Reims (1119) =

The Council of Reims, was convened by Pope Callixtus II on 20 October 1119. Prior to convening the synod, Callixtus consecrated Thurstan as Archbishop of York, despite the impediments by King Henry I of England. During the Council, Callixtus traveled to meet Emperor Henry V concerning the investiture dispute, but upon hearing that the Emperor had brought an army, he quickly returned to Reims. The Synod heard concerns over conflict in Normandy, marital dispute between Duke William IX of Aquitaine and his wife, and lay investitures. Callixtus personally stated he would secure peace between France and England, gave a final date for William of Aquitaine to appear before a papal court, and reaffirmed Henry V's excommunication. The Council also passed decrees condemning those who have seized ecclesiastical property, prohibited charging a fee for burial or sacrament, banned priests, deacons and sub-deacons from having wives or mistresses, and condemned simony.

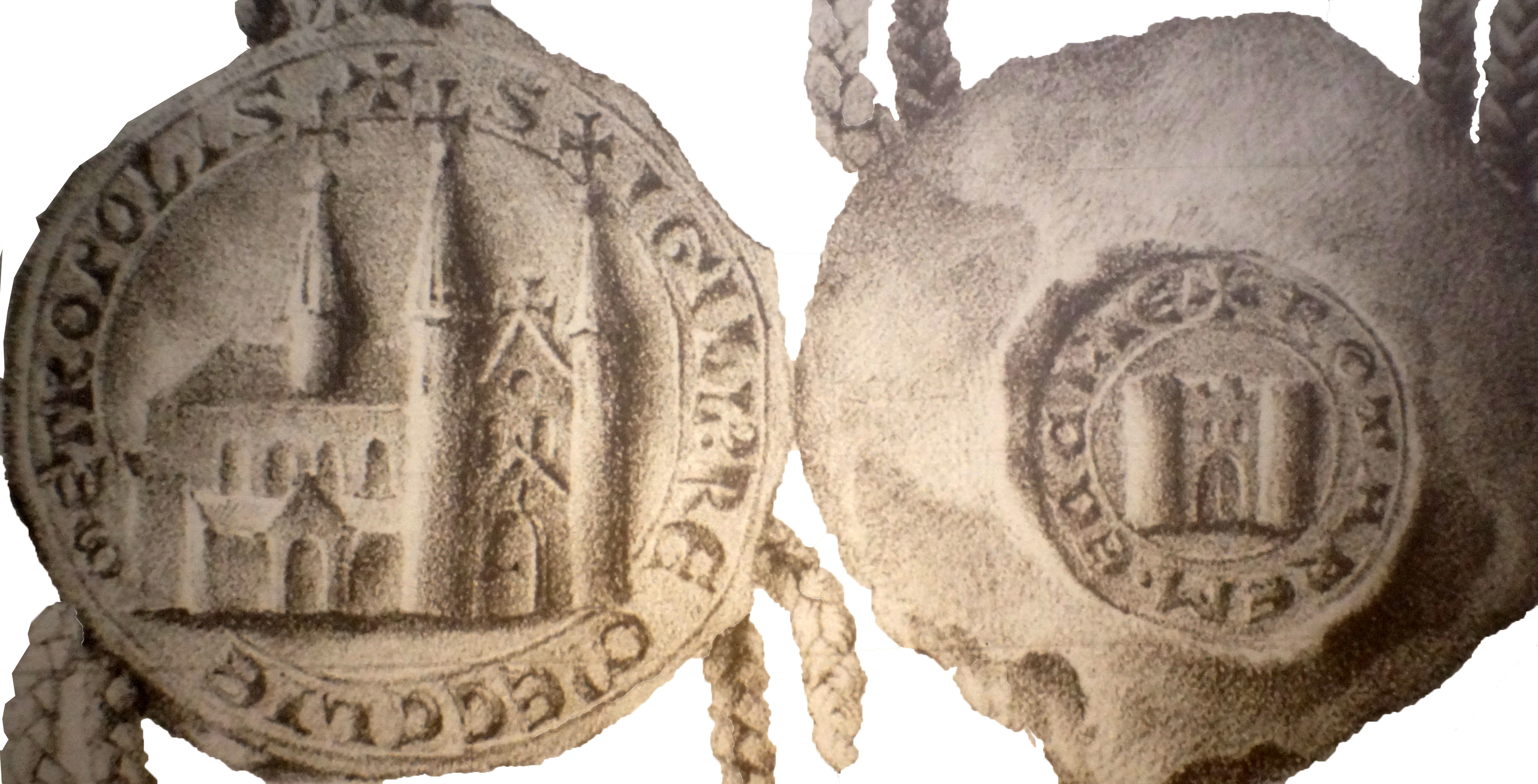
Seal of Reims cathedral in the 12th century

== Journey to Reims ==
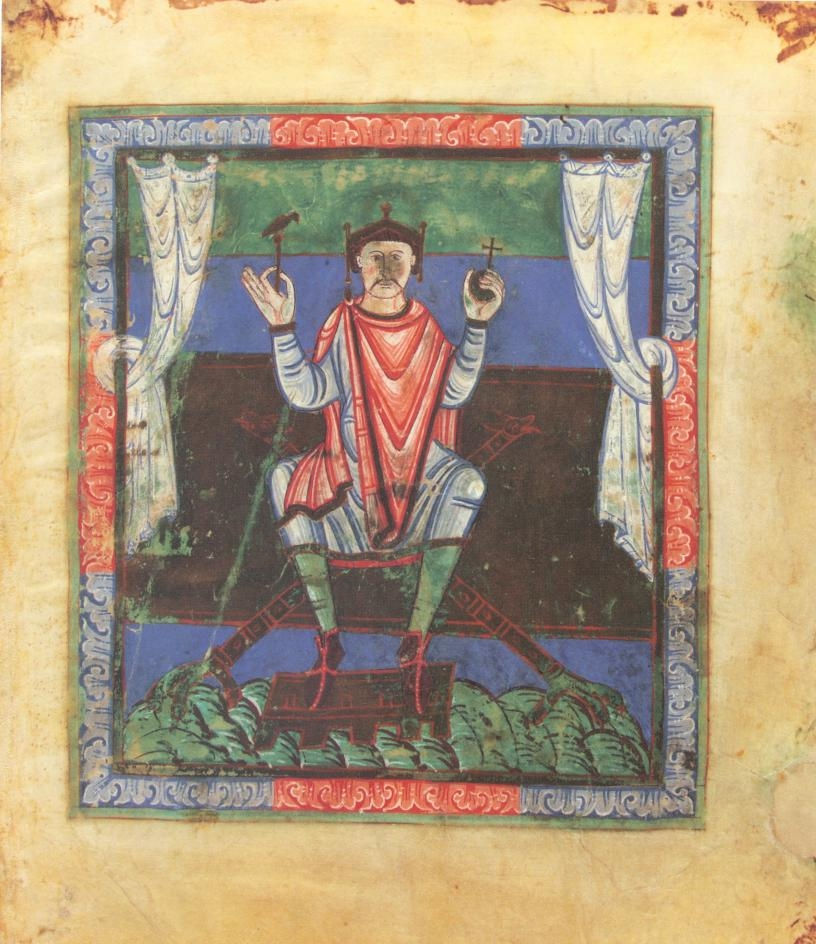
Excommunicated Emperor Henry V.

Following the Council at Toulouse, Callixtus II travelled to Paris, arriving on 7 October 1119, where he received a delegation of clerics from York, England petitioning for the consecration of Thurstan. He subsequently proceeded to Reims, where on 18 October he met Thurstan in the presence of several cardinals (Note: This meeting included Cuno of Praeneste, Lambert, cardinal bishop of Ostia, Chrysogonus, cardinal deacon of St. Nicola in Carcere, John of Crema, cardinal of San Grisogono, Petrus Pierleone, cardinal deacon of St Cosma and Daminao, Gregory, cardinal deacon of San Angelo, and Peter Rufus, cardinal deacon of St. Sylvester.) and agreed to proceed with his consecration, which was carried out the following day. The Anglo-Norman delegation, sent by Henry I to prevent the consecration, arrived after the ceremony had already taken place.

During the council, Callixtus and Emperor Henry V, who was excommunicated and seeking a settlement that would preserve imperial influence in the appointment of bishops, were to have a private discussion in Mousson. Instead of arriving alone as had been anticipated, Henry arrived with an army of about thirty thousand. Callixtus initially left for Mousson however, reports of Henry V's army raised concerns that he might be compelled to make concessions unfavorable to the Church, leading him to return to Reims.

== Council ==
On 20 October 1119 (Note: C. Warren Hollister and Roger Wickson both state the Council was opened 18 October 1119) (Note: Georg Strack indicates the Council was convened on 19 October 1119.) Callixtus convened the council. Louis VI of France was present, seeking to gain papal influence after his defeat at Bremule. The major issues discussed during the Council were: simony, seizure of church property, inheritance of church offices or benefices, and clerical marriage.

=== Investiture dispute ===
Upon his return, Callixtus met with the council explaining how the meeting with the Emperor failed to occur, in no small part due to Henry's arrival with an army. He was further annoyed by the council's unwillingness to issue a decree condemning all lay investiture, since the contents of the decree banning lay investiture sparked such unrest that its reading was deferred. The following day, Callixtus preached a sermon before the new decree was officially promulgated. During this address, Calixtus II warned that he would dissolve the council without issuing any canons. He likened the dissenting clerics to unbelievers and ordered them to withdraw from the assembly. As a result, the decree's original ban on lay investiture was narrowed to apply only to bishoprics and abbeys. By the end of the council however, Henry V’s excommunication was reaffirmed.

=== Norman affairs ===
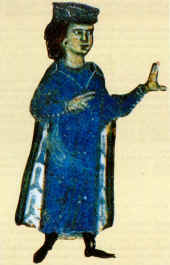
Duke William of Aquitaine

King Louis VI of France accused King Henry I of England of invading Normandy, imprisoning Robert, duke of Normandy, and disinheriting Robert's son William. Amaury III de Montfort was accused by Bishop Audoin of Evreux of expelling him from and burning his church. In response, Amaury's chaplain stated Bishop Audoin and Henry I had burned Evreux and the church. After two days of fierce discussion the argument was close to spiraling out of control, until certain members of the clergy brought the council to order allowing Callixtus to deliver his sermon. At the end of his sermon, Callixtus stated he would personally find a resolution to the conflict between France and England, and anyone that interfered would be excommunicated.

=== Monastic privilege ===
The bishop of Macon criticized the intrusions by the Abbey of Cluny, to which Abbot Pons gave an explicit response leading to a vast uproar by attending clerics.

=== Hildegarde's martial dispute ===
Hildegarde, (Note: "Some historians believe this figure to have been Ermendgarde of Anjou (c.1069-1147)". While, "Francois Villard proposes a different interpretation. It is his contention that the ‘high, clear voice’ of complaint at the Council of Rheims belonged to Philippa, who was still very much alive, and that Orderic Vitalis mistakenly referred to her by the name of her mother-in-law, Aldiarde de Bourgogne.") wife of Duke William IX of Aquitaine, appeared before the council stating that the wife of the viscount of Chatellerault, Malberge, had taken her place. Callixtus inquired if William was present to answer this charge. Instead, the bishop of Saintes and other Aquitainian bishops and abbots gave excuses, stating the duke had started out for Reims but was delayed by sickness. Callixtus postponed the issue and set a deadline for William to appear before the papal court or face excommunication.

== Legacy ==
Callixtus spoke to the assembly calling on the French and Anglo-Normans to 'observe the Truce of God' as established at the Council of Clermont in 1096. The council proclaimed these decrees; forbid investiture by laymen, condemn those who have seized ecclesiastical property, prohibited charging a fee for burial or sacrament, banned priests, deacons, or sub-deacons from having wives or mistresses, condemned simony, and reaffirmed the excommunication of Emperor Henry V and antipope Gregory VIII.

At the end of the council (30 October), Callixtus issued a bull of conferral stating that the Archbishopric of York was not subject to the Archbishopric of Canterbury, a decision that conflicted with Henry I’s policy of limiting papal interference in English ecclesiastical affairs.

== Sources ==
- Aird, William M. (2008). Robert Curthose, Duke of Normandy, c. 1050-1134. The Boydell Press. ISBN 9781843833109.
- Bisson, Thomas N. (2015). The Crisis of the Twelfth Century: Power, Lordship, and the Origins of European Government. Princeton University Press. ISBN 9780691169767.
- Davies, John Reuben (2008). "Aspects of Church Reform in Wales, c. 1093 - c. 1223". In Lewis, C.P. (ed.). Anglo-Norman Studies XXX: Proceedings of the Battle Conference 2007. The Boydell Press. pp. 85–99. ISBN 9781843833796.
- Duggan, Anne J. (2016). "Sicut ex scriptis vestris accepimus: Innocent II and the insulae Britanniae et Hiberniae". In Smith, Damian J.; Doran, John (eds.). Pope Innocent II (1130-43): The World Vs the City. Routledge. pp. 69–106. ISBN 9781317078319.
- Harvey, Ruth E. (1993). "The wives of the 'first troubadour', Duke William IX of Aquitaine". Journal of Medieval History. 19(4): 307–325. doi:10.1016/0304-4181(93)90002-T.
- Hollister, C. Warren (2008). Henry I. Yale University Press. ISBN 9780300143720.
- MacCaffrey, James (1908). "Pope Callistus II". The Catholic Encyclopedia. Vol. 3.
- Morris, Colin (2001). The Papal Monarchy: The Western Church from 1050 to 1250. Clarendon Press. ISBN 0-19-826925-0.
- Niiranen, Susanna (2012). ""I know how to be a whore and thief" The poet's reputation: troubadours-ancestors of poetes maudits?". In Classen, Albrecht; Scarborough, Connie (eds.). Crime and Punishment in the Middle Ages and Early Modern Age: Mental-Historical Investigations of Basic Human Problems and Social Responses. De Gruyter. pp. 43–64. ISBN 978-3-11-029451-4.
- Pennington, Kenneth (2007). "The Normans in Palermo: King Roger II's Legislation". In Morillo, Stephen (ed.). The Haskins Society Journal 18: 2006. Studies in Medieval History. Hambledon Press. pp. 140–167.
- Strack, Georg (2023). "Imitatio Christi in Papal Synodal Sermons, 1095-1274". In Strack, Georg; Ozawa, Minoru; Smith, Thomas W. (eds.). Communicating Papal Authority in the Middle Ages. Routledge. pp. 31–45. ISBN 9781000839869.
- Stroll, Mary (2004). Calixtus II (1119–1124): A Pope born to Rule. Brill. ISBN 9789004139879.
- Summerlin, Danica (2016). "Papal Councils in the High Middle Ages". In Larson, Atria; Sisson, Keith (eds.). A Companion to the Medieval Papacy: Growth of an Ideology and Institution. Brill. pp. 174–198. ISBN 9789004315280.
- Tout, Thomas Frederick (1965). The Empire and the papacy, 918-1273 (8th ed.). T. and A. Constable Ltd.
- Wickson, Roger (2015). Kings and Bishops in Medieval England, 1066-1216. Palgrave. ISBN 9781137431189.
