= Georg Strack =

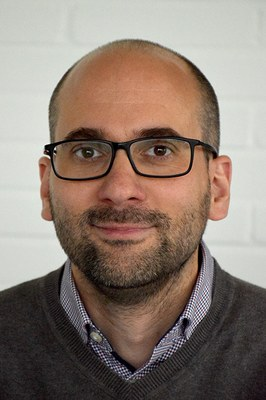
Strack in 2019

Georg Strack, (born 1977 in Oberndorf near Salzburg, Austria) is an Austrian historian. Since October 2019, he has served as Professor of Medieval History at Philipps University Marburg.

== Life ==
Georg Strack studied Medieval History at LMU Munich from 1999 to 2004, with secondary concentrations in Modern and Contemporary History and German Medieval Studies. Supported by a doctoral scholarship from the German National Academic Foundation between 2005 and 2008, he also conducted research in Italy as a fellow of the German Historical Institute in Rome from March to May 2007. In 2008, he completed his doctorate under the supervision of Claudia Märtl with a dissertation entitled Thomas Pirckheimer (†1473): Learned Counsellor and Early Humanist.

From 2008 to 2011, Strack coordinated the junior research group Cultural and Religious Diversity in the Middle Ages and Renaissance. Since 2011, he has served as a research associate in the Department of History at LMU Munich, working at the Chair of Late Medieval History. During the summer semester of 2013, he was a Junior Research Fellow at LMU's Center for Advanced Studies.

In 2014, he undertook a postdoctoral research stay in Italy through a fellowship from the German Historical Institute in Rome and subsequently served as a research associate at Rikkyo University in Tokyo in September of that year. From 2015 to 2016, he was a research partner in the Mitsubishi Foundation–funded project European Perceptions of Asia in the Middle Ages: An Analysis of Papal Missions.

Strack completed his postdoctoral qualifications in Medieval History and Historical Auxiliary Sciences in 2017 with a thesis titled Solo sermone: Transmission and Interpretation of Political Speeches of the Popes in the Middle Ages. From the summer semester of 2018 through the winter semester of 2018 to 2019, he held a substitute W3 professorship at the University of Würzburg.

== Papal Sermon Research ==
In his doctoral thesis, Strack investigated the preservation, transmission, and interpretation of papal political speeches between the eleventh and fourteenth centuries. He conceived the project as a contribution to the study of medieval rhetoric and, more broadly, to the cultural history of political communication.

The study offers a detailed examination of the textual tradition surrounding Pope Urban II's renowned crusade sermon delivered at Clermont in 1095. It also analyzes the speeches of Innocent IV at the First Council of Lyon (1245), Gregory X at the Second Council of Lyon (1274), and Clement V at the Council of Vienne (1311–1312).

In an appendix, Strack provided the first critical edition of Desiderio desideravi (Luke 22:15), the sermon preached by Innocent III at the opening of the Fourth Lateran Council in 1215. This edited text is published on pages 297–310 of the volume.

== Sources ==
- München (2026). "PD Dr. Georg Strack - Mittelalterliche Geschichte - Ludwig-Maximilians-Universität München" (in German). Ludwig-Maximilians-Universität München.
