= Dictatus papae =

Compilation of 27 statements of authority claimed by the pope

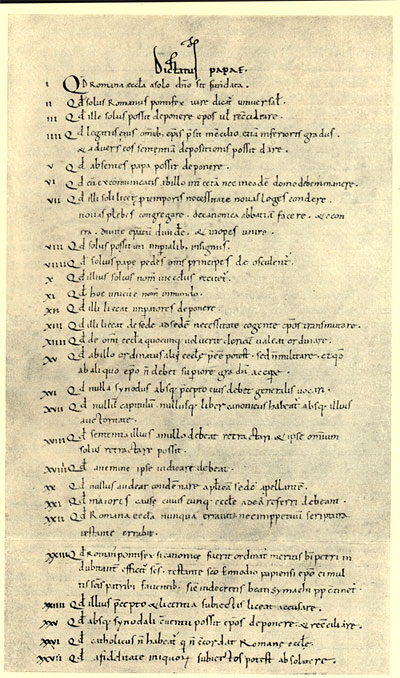
The Dictatus papae in a Vatican manuscript

Dictatus papae is a compilation of 27 statements of authority claimed by the pope that was included in Pope Gregory VII's register under the year 1075.

== Principles ==
The principles expressed in Dictatus Papae are mostly those expressed by the Gregorian Reform, which had been initiated by Gregory decades before he became pope. It does not mention key aspects of the reform movement such as the abolishing of the triple abuse of clerical marriage, lay investiture and simony. The axioms of the Dictatus advance the strongest case for papal supremacy and infallibility. The axiom "That it may be permitted to him to depose emperors" qualified the early medieval balance of power embodied in the letter Famuli vestrae pietatis of Pope Gelasius I to the Eastern Roman Emperor Anastasius (494), which outlined the separation and complementarity of spiritual and temporal powers - auctoritas (spiritual) and potestas or imperium (temporal), the former being ultimately superior to the latter - under which the West had been ruled since Merovingian times. "None of the conflicts of the years 1075 and following can be directly traced to opposition to it (though several of the claims made in it were also made by Gregory and his supporters during these conflicts)". Later medieval developments of the relationship between spiritual and secular power would come with Pope Boniface VIII, who famously formulated the image of the two swords in the papal bull Unam Sanctam (1302).

While most of the principles of the Dictatus Papae detail the powers of the papacy and infallibility of the Roman church, principle 9 dictates that "All princes shall kiss the feet of the Pope alone," and principle 10 states that "His [the pope's] name alone shall be spoken in the churches."

== Authorship ==
The title Dictatus Papae implies that the pope composed the piece himself. It does not mean a "papal dictate" or any kind of manifesto; rather, it means "papal dictation". It was not published, in the sense of being widely copied and made known outside the immediate circle of the papal curia.

Some historians believe that it was written or dictated by Gregory himself, and others that it had a different origin and was inserted in the register at a later date. In 1087 Deusdedit, a cardinal and ally of Gregory, published a collection of decretals, dedicated to Pope Victor III, that embodied the law of the Church – canon law – which he had compiled from many sources, both legitimate and false (see Pseudo-Isidore). The Dictatus Papae agrees so closely with this collection that some have argued the Dictatus must have been based on it.

== Index of Principles ==
Number	Latin	English translation
I	Quod Romana ecclesia a solo Domino sit fundata.	That the Roman church is founded by the Lord alone.
II	Quod solus Romanus pontifex iure dicatur universalis.	That the Roman pontiff alone is called universal by right.
III	Quod ille solus possit deponere episcopos vel reconciliare.	That he alone can depose or reconcile bishops.
IV	Quod legatus eius omnibus episcopis presit in concilio etiam inferioris gradus et adversus eos sententiam depositionis possit dare.	That his legate presides in council to all bishops even when he is of inferior grade and can give a sentence of deposition against them.
V	Quod absentes papa possit deponere.	That the pope can depose those absent.
VI	Quod cum excommunicatis ab illo inter cetera nec in eadem domo debemus manere.	That among other things we neither ought to remain in the same house of the one excommunicated by him.
VII	Quod illi soli licet pro temporis necessitate novas leges condere, novas plebes congregare, de canonica abatiam facere et e contra, divitem episcopatum dividere et inopes unire.	That for him alone is it licit, according to the necessity of time to establish new laws, to welcome new peoples, to make new abbacies of canonical right and, contrariwise, to divide rich bishoprics and unite needy ones.
VIII	Quod solus possit uti imperialibus insigniis.	That he alone can use the imperial insignia.
IX	Quod solius pape pedes omnes principes deosculentur.	That all princes are to kiss the feet of the pope alone.
X	Quod illius solius nomen in ecclesiis recitetur.	That the name of him alone is to be recited in the churches.
XI	Quod hoc unicum est nomen in mundo.	That this is the only name in the world.
XII	Quod illi liceat imperatores deponere.	That for him it is licit to depose emperors.
XIII	Quod illi liceat de sede ad sedem necessitate cogente episcopos transmutare.	That for him it is licit when driven by necessity to transfer bishops from see to see.
XIV	Quod de omni ecclesia quocunque voluerit clericum valeat ordinare.	That he validly ordains any cleric from any church wheresoever.
XV	Quod ab illo ordinatus alii eclesie preesse potest, sed non militare; et quod ab aliquo episcopo non debet superiorem gradum accipere.	That the one ordained by him can take charge of any church, but not serve as a soldier; and that he ought not accept a superior grade from any bishop.
XVI	Quod nulla synodus absque precepto eius debet generalis vocari.	That no synod without his precept ought to be called general.
XVII	Quod nullum capitulum nullusque liber canonicus habeatur absque illius auctoritate.	That no chapter be held and no canonical book be recognized without his authority.
XVIII	Quod sententia illius a nullo debeat retractari et ipse omnium solus retractare possit.	That his sentence ought to be retracted by no one and that he alone can retract that of all.
XIX	Quod a nemine ipse iudicare debeat.	That he himself must be judged by no one.
XX	Quo nullus audeat condemnare apostolicam sedem apellantem.	That no one dare condemn the one appealing to the apostolic see.
XXI	Quod maiores cause cuiscunque ecclesie ad eam referri debeant.	That the greater cases of every church whatsoever must be referred to her.
XXII	Quod Romana ecclesia nunquam erravit nec imperpetuum scriptura testante errabit.	That the Roman church has never erred nor will ever err in perpetuity, as scripture testifies.
XXIII	Quod Romanus pontifex, si canonice fuerit ordinatus, meritis beati Petri indubitanter efficitur sanctus testante sancto Ennodio Papiensi episcopo ei multis sanctis patribus faventibus, sicut in decretis beati Symachi pape continetur.	That the Roman pontiff, if he has been canonically ordained, is indubitably made holy by the merits of Blessed Peter, according to the testimony of Saint Ennodius, bishop of Pavia, with many holy fathers favoring him, just as is contained in the decrees of blessed pope Symachus.
XXIV	Quod illius precepto et licentia subiectis liceat accusare.	That by his precept and license it is licit for his subjects to accuse.
XXV	Quod absque synodali conventu possit episcopus deponere et reconciliare.	That he can depose and reconcile bishops without the synodal convened.
XXVI	Quod catholicus non habeatur, qui non concordat Romane ecclesie.	That one is not to be held to be catholic, who does not concord with the Roman church.
XXVII	Quod a fidelitate iniquorum subiectos potest absolvere.	That he can absolve the subjects of the iniquitous from fidelity.

== See also ==
- Apostasy
- Heresy
- Libertas ecclesiae

== Notes and references ==
- Das Register Gregors. VII, ed. E. Caspar (in series M.G.H. Epistolae Selectae ii, Berlin 1920-3), pp. 202–8: section translated by G.A. Loud
