= Libertas ecclesiae =

Catholic theory on the freedom of the church

Libertas ecclesiae ("freedom of the Church" in Latin) is the theory of freedom of religion of ecclesiastical authority of the Catholic Church from secular or the temporal power, that is, the freedom to accomplish its spiritual mission without interference from any secular power.

== The 11th century ==
Libertas ecclesiae guided the Gregorian Reform in the 11th century.

After the decentralization of the post-Carolingian period, this became the slogan of the Catholic Church in light of disapproval over lay warlords installing themselves as abbots and other high-profile churchmen. Unfit to perform theological functions, much less to defend the interests of the Catholic Church, these warlords viewed Catholic Church property as an extension of their own landholdings.

What resulted was the plunder of movable wealth (of which the monasteries had become the keepers during the period of Viking invasion) and the parcelling out of land and office as the temporal powers saw fit. This low state of the Catholic Church prompted enthusiasm for 'freeing' it from the direct control of these milites; Gregory VII helped frame this goal through the specifics of his reform program, issuing a Papal Bull in 1077.

In addition to calling for spiritually pure figures at the helm of the Catholic Church, Pope Gregory VII addressed the practical problems of pluralism (holding more than one church office) and poorly educated clerics.

== Terminology ==
When Gratian wrote the Decretum Gratiani in the 12th century, he wrote of the ‘libertas ecclesiastica’ and this phrase was continued by several popes.

== Libertas Ecclesias through the centuries ==
Several Christian leaders have been murdered or persecuted for their support of freedom of religion, including Thomas Beckett, Boniface VIII, St Catherine of Siena and Cardinal Zen.

== 20th century ==
In 1965, the Second Vatican Council issued the Dignitatis Humanae, which stated the church's support for protecting religious liberty. There was much debate and disagreement about this document and in 2019, Pope Francis approved an update.

== 21st century ==
In the 21st century, some secular authorities around the world continue to exercise restrictions of religious expression, for example, Afghanistan and North Korea. The practical aspects of freedom of religion continues to be debated.

== See also ==
- Dictatus papae (statements by Pope Gregory VII)
- Freedom of Religion
