= Stadtbibliothek Schaffhausen =

The Stadtbibliothek Schaffhausen (Schaffhausen City Library) maintains a universal scientific stock., but without being associated with a university.

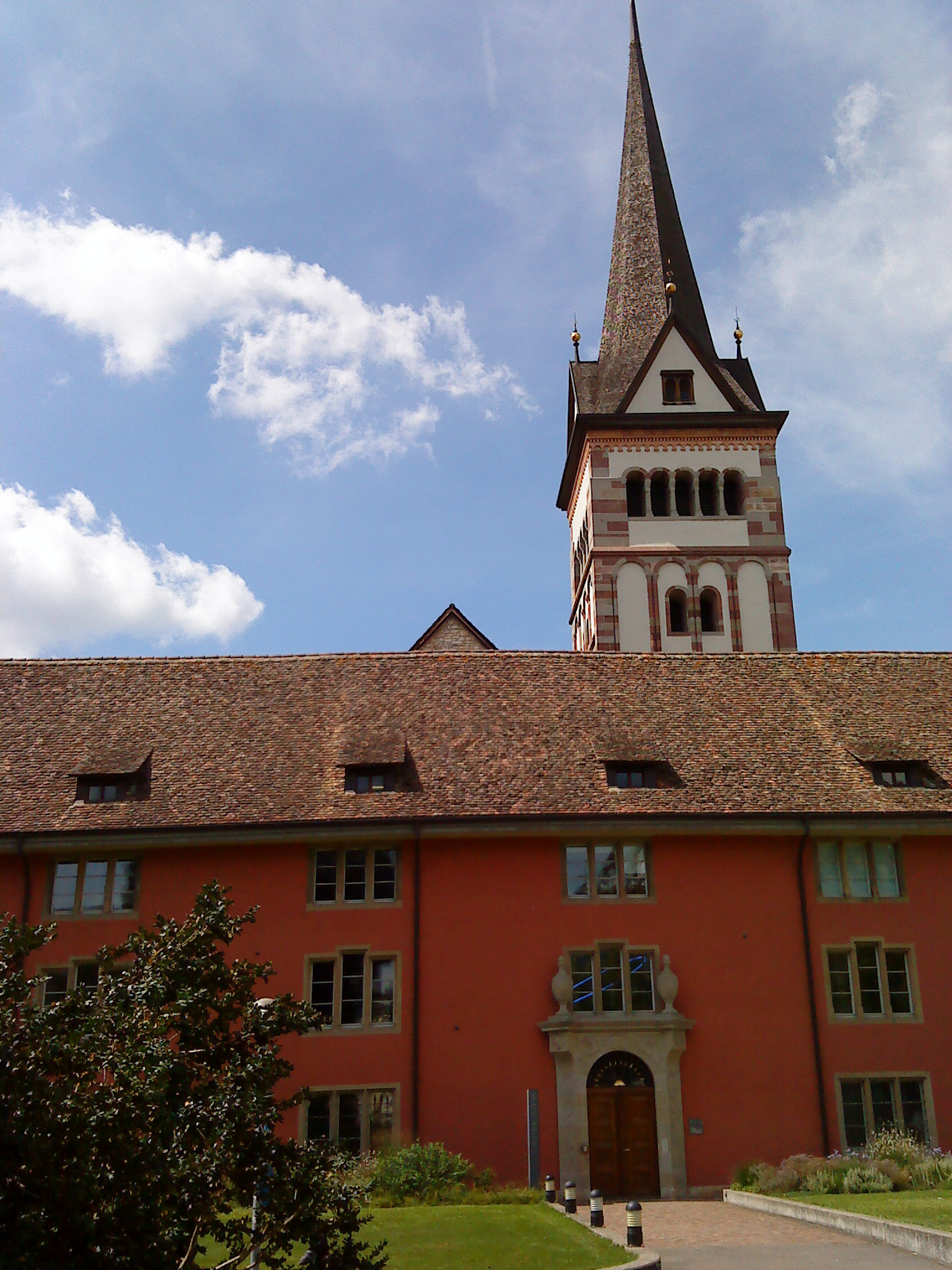

Since the Canton of Schaffhausen does not maintain its own library, the Public Library performs the tasks of a cantonal library. As such, it collects literature on local and regional history.

The library's dual function of being a public library on one hand and a scientific library on the other is fulfilled by two physically separate locations in Schaffhausen:

- the Stadtbibliothek am Münsterplatz 47°41′43.4″N 8°38′13.4″E | OSM with the historical holdings, manuscripts, incunabula, special scientific literature, Schaffhausen cultural heritage (Scaphusiana) and the ministerial library. It is still managed as a storage library.
  - Media stock (2018): 232'300.
- the Freihandbibliothek Agnesenschütte 47°41′52.7″N 8°38′12.8″E as a modern, public library with open access to popular scientific and entertaining literature, books for children and young people, audio-visual media.
  - Media stock (2018): 46'200

== History ==
Schaffhausen has a long and rich library history. The Benedictine monastery of Allerheiligen ("All Saints") founded in 1049 already had a library and a scriptorium. The first list of books from that time has been preserved, as well as around 70 manuscripts from the 11th and 12th centuries. In the course of the Reformation, however, the monastery was abolished, the library stock passed to the Reformed clergy and now forms the basis of the ministerial library first mentioned in 1547. This library remains under spiritual custody; its holdings are now administered as a deposit by the municipal library.

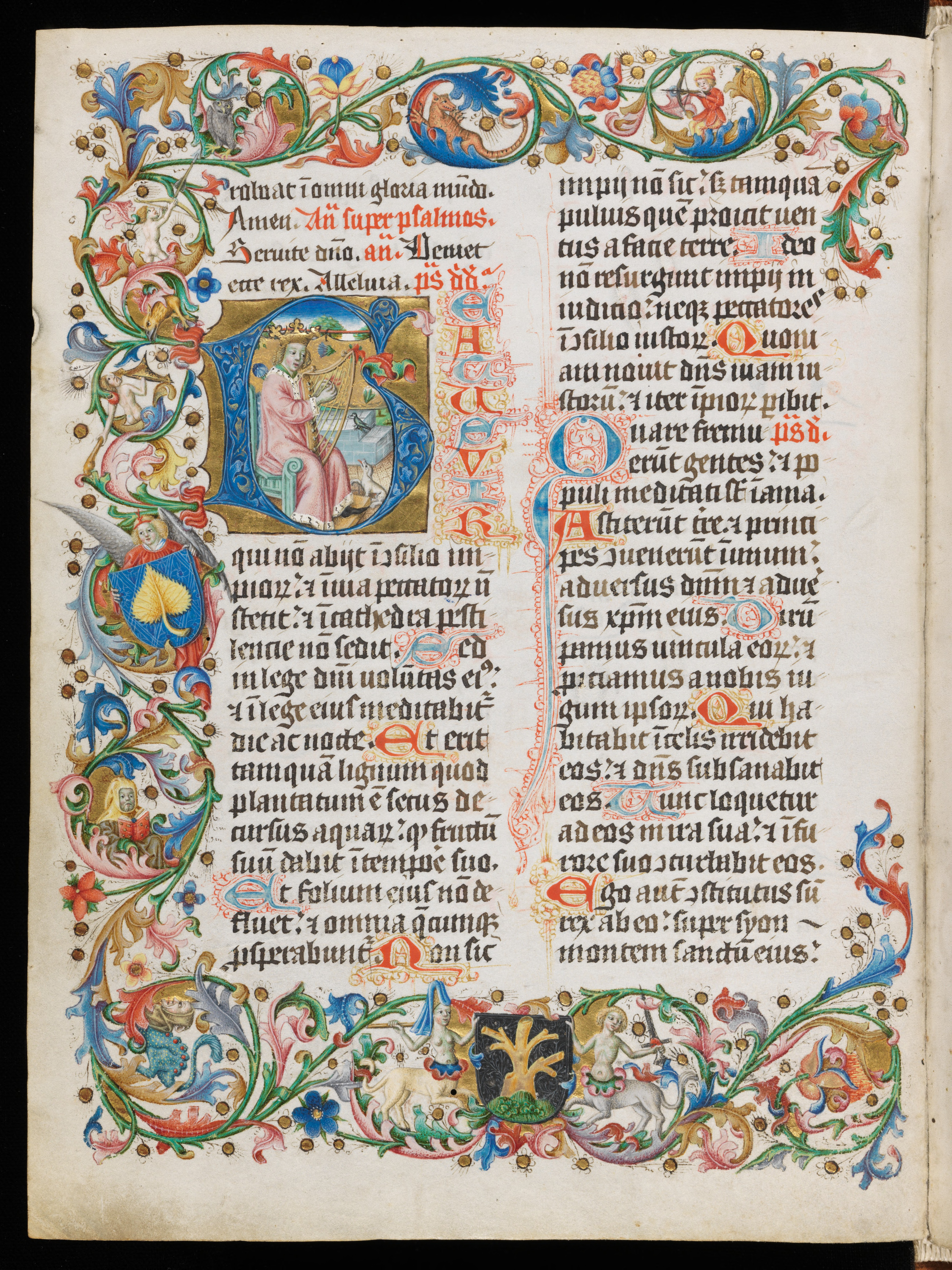
Breviarium OFM (pars hiemalis), 15th century

As the Ministerial Library was too specialised in theological literature and not accessible to the public, some citizens of Schaffhausen founded their own library in 1636, modelled on the Zurich Civil Library. This public library is above all a scientific library which is intended to satisfy the urge of the times for general scholarship. In order to build up and expand its holdings, the public library is dependent on voluntary book and cash donations from the population. In its early days, it was housed in the Kreuzsaal of the dissolved monastery of All Saints, but then moved to Rheinstrasse in 1792. At the beginning of the 19th century, the public library becomes the property of the town, receives a new legal basis and is officially called the town library from now on.

In the course of the 19th century the circle of users and the tasks of the library expanded. In order to provide sufficient space for the new requirements, the library changed location again and first moved to Herrenacker in 1829 and then to the Korn- und Kabishaus near the Münsterturm in 1923. Between 1993 and 1995, the building is rebuilt again and extended by an underground storeroom.

In 1986 the centralisation of various functional areas in one building was abolished. The two - spatially separate but jointly managed - sub-libraries were created.

== Use and stock ==
The Municipal Library and the Ministerial Library administered by it are characterised by an extensive old stock: 160 medieval manuscripts from the monastery of All Saints and from other provenances, including the Vita s. Columbae (7th century), 260 incunabula (prints from before 1500), manuscripts and letters from the Reformation and from the 18th century. The collection will be successively digitised and made available on the portals e-rara for old and valuable prints and e-codices for medieval manuscripts. Particularly noteworthy are the papers of the Schaffhausen Reformer Johann Conrad Ulmer (1519–1600) and the estates of the brothers Johannes von Müller (1752–1809) and Johann Georg Müller (1759–1819)

The municipal library on Münsterplatz and the open access library Agnesenschütte are open to everyone and offer rooms for self-study, meetings and exchange of ideas. Use of the libraries is free of charge. A personal user card is required to borrow books for home use. This card is valid for the Agnesenschütte Library as well as for the library on Münsterplatz. Via the online catalogue, the user can carry out research on the holdings of both libraries. All books and media from 1985 onwards are listed there, and increasingly also older holdings

== Literature ==
- Heinrich Boos. Verzeichnis der Handschriften und Inkunabeln der Schaffhauser Stadtbibliothek, nebst einem Verzeichnis des handschriftlichen Nachlasses von Johannes von Müller. Schaffhausen 1903, doi:10.3931/e-rara-79808 (Digitized Edition at e-rara)
- Johann Jakob Mezger. Geschichte der Stadtbibliothek in Schaffhausen. Schaffhausen 1871.
