= Pope Callixtus II =

Head of the Catholic Church from 1119 to 1124

- Bishop of Rome
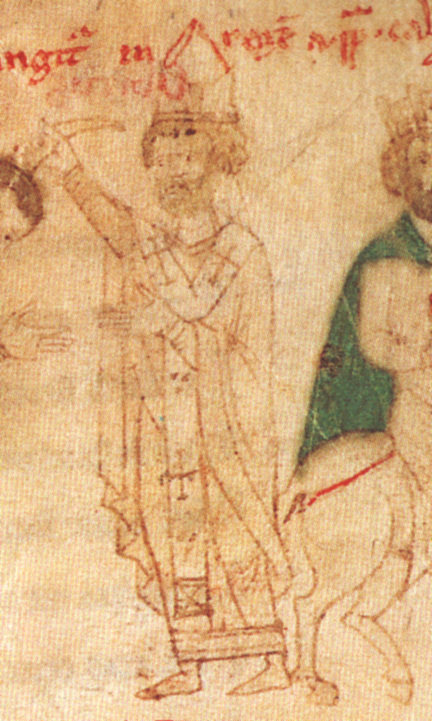
- Callixtus II as depicted in the Liber ad honorem Augusti by Peter of Eboli, 1196
- Church: Catholic Church
- Papacy began: 2 February 1119
- Papacy ended: 13 December 1124
- Predecessor: Gelasius II
- Successor: Honorius II
- Previous post: Archbishop of Vienne (1088–1119)

Personal details
- Born: Guy of Burgundy c. 1065 Quingey, County of Burgundy, Holy Roman Empire
- Died: 13 December 1124 Rome, Papal States, Holy Roman Empire

Pope Callixtus II or Callistus II (c. 1065 – 13 December 1124), born Guy of Burgundy, was the head of the Catholic Church and ruler of the Papal States from February 1119 to his death in 1124. His pontificate was shaped by the Investiture Controversy, which he was able to settle through the Concordat of Worms in 1122.

Guy became archbishop of Vienne and served as papal legate to France. He attended the Lateran Synod of 1112. He was elected pope at Cluny in 1119. The following year, prompted by attacks on Jews, he issued the bull Sicut Judaeis which forbade Christians, on pain of excommunication, from forcing Jews to convert, from harming them, from taking their property, from disturbing the celebration of their festivals, and from interfering with their cemeteries. In March 1123, Calixtus II convened the First Lateran Council, which passed several disciplinary decrees, such as those against simony and concubinage among the clergy, and violators of the Truce of God.

== Early life ==
Born in Besancon, Guy was the son of Count William I of Burgundy. At the age of eight he became a member of the cathedral chapter of St. John of Besançon. His brothers, Rainald, Stephen, and Hugh (Note: His brother Hugh was archbishop of Besançon.), all died on crusade. After his falling out with Pope Urban II, Guy was not present at the Council of Clermont in November 1095 and did not join the crusade.

== Archbishop of Vienne ==
Guy first appears in contemporary records when he became the archbishop of Vienne in 1088. He held strong pro-papal views about the Investiture controversy. As archbishop, he was appointed papal legate to France by Pope Paschal II during the time that Paschal was induced under pressure from Holy Roman Emperor Henry V to issue the Privilegium of 1111, by which he yielded much of the papal prerogatives that had been so forcefully claimed by Pope Gregory VII in the Gregorian Reforms. These concessions were received with violent opposition and nowhere more so than in France, where the opposition was led by Archbishop Guy, who had attended the Lateran Synod of 1112.

On his return to France, he immediately convened an assembly of French and Burgundian bishops at Vienne, where the imperial claim to a traditional lay investiture of the clergy was denounced as heretical and a sentence of excommunication was now pronounced against Henry V on the grounds that he had extorted the Privilegium from Paschal II by means of violence. The council called Pope Paschal a simpleton (quod rex extorsit a vestra simplicitate). These decrees were sent to Paschal II with a request for a confirmation, which they received on 20 October 1112.

== Papacy ==
Paschal does not seem to have been quite pleased with Guy's zeal in his attacks upon Henry V. During the violent confrontations between Henry V and Paschal II's successor, Pope Gelasius II, the pope was forced to flee from Rome, first to Gaeta, where he was crowned, then to the Cluny Abbey, where he died on 29 January 1119. Guy was elected at Cluny on 2 February 1119. Nine cardinals took part in the election. Most of the other cardinals were in Rome. He was crowned at Vienne on 9 February 1119 as Calixtus II. In July 1119, Calixtus convened a synod at Toulouse addressing heresy, ecclesiastical discipline, and disputes within the French church. The council decreed that those who denied the Eucharist, infant baptism, ordination of priests, and lawful marriage were heretics.

At the outset, it appeared that the new pope was willing to negotiate with Henry V, who received the papal embassy at Strasbourg, and withdrew his support from the antipope he had proclaimed at Rome. It was agreed that pope and emperor should meet at the Château de Mousson, near Reims, and in October the new Pope opened the council at Reims attended by Louis VI of France with most of the barons of France and more than four hundred bishops and abbots. Henry V arrived for his personal conference at Mousson — not alone, as had been anticipated, but with an army of over thirty thousand men. Calixtus II, fearing that force was likely to be used to extract prejudicial concessions, remained at Reims. There, Calixtus II busied himself ineffectively with attempting a reconciliation between the brothers Henry I of England and Robert II of Normandy, and the council dealt with disciplinary regulations and decrees against lay investiture, simony, and clerical concubines. Since there was no compromise coming from Henry V, it was determined on 30 October 1119 that the Emperor and his antipope should be solemnly excommunicated.

Returning to Italy, where antipope Gregory VIII was supported in Rome by imperial forces and Italian allies of the emperor, Calixtus II managed to gain the upper hand amid clear demonstrations of popular support. The Imperial candidate was obliged to flee to the fortress of Sutri, where he was taken prisoner through the intervention of Norman support from the Kingdom of Sicily. He was transferred from prison to prison first near Salerno, and afterwards at the fortress of Fumo. The imperial allies in Rome soon disbanded.

=== Sicut Judaeis ===
In 1120 Calixtus II issued the papal bull Sicut Judaeis (Latin: "As the Jews") setting out the official position of the papacy regarding the treatment of Jews. The bull was intended to protect Jews and echoed the position of Pope Gregory I that Jews were entitled to "enjoy their lawful liberty". The bull forbade Christians, on pain of excommunication, from forcing Jews to convert, from harming them, from taking their property, from disturbing the celebration of their festivals, and from interfering with their cemeteries. It was reaffirmed by popes Alexander III, Celestine III (1191–1198), Innocent III (1199), Honorius III (1216), Gregory IX (1235), Innocent IV (1246), Alexander IV (1255), Urban IV (1262), Gregory X (1272 & 1274), Nicholas III, Martin IV (1281), Honorius IV (1285–1287), Nicholas IV (1288–92), Clement VI (1348), Urban V (1365), Boniface IX (1389), Martin V (1422), and Nicholas V (1447).

=== Concordat of Worms ===
Having established his power in Italy, the pope resolved to re-open negotiations with Henry V on the question of investiture. Henry V was anxious to put an end to a controversy, which had reduced imperial authority in Germany terminally so as it appeared in the long run. An embassy of three cardinals was sent by Calixtus II to Germany, and negotiations for a permanent settlement of the investiture struggle were begun in October 1121 at Würzburg, where it was agreed that a general truce should be proclaimed in Germany, the Church should have free use of its possessions and the lands of those in rebellion should be restored.

Those decrees were communicated to Calixtus II, who despatched the legate Lambert to assist at the synod that had been convoked at Worms, where, on 23 September 1122, the agreement known as the Concordat of Worms was concluded. On his side, the Emperor abandoned his claim to investiture with ring and crosier and granted freedom of election to episcopal sees. On the papal side, it was conceded that the bishops should receive investiture with the sceptre; the episcopal elections should be held in the presence of the Emperor or his representatives; in case of disputed elections the emperor should, after the decision of the metropolitan and the suffragan bishops, confirm the rightfully-elected candidate; and the imperial investiture of the temporal properties connected to the sees should take place in Germany before the consecration.

In Burgundy and in Italy, the imperial investiture would take place after the consecration ceremony, and in the Papal States, the pope alone had the right of investiture without any interference on the part of the emperor. As a result of the Concordat, the Emperor still retained in his hands the controlling influence in the election of the bishops in Germany though he had abandoned much in regard to episcopal elections in Italy and Burgundy.

=== First Lateran Council ===
To secure the confirmation of this Concordat of Worms, Calixtus II convened the First Lateran Council on 18 March 1123. It solemnly confirmed the Concordat and passed several disciplinary decrees, such as those against simony and concubinage among the clergy. Decrees were also passed against violators of the Truce of God, church-robbers, and forgers of ecclesiastical documents. The indulgences already granted to the crusaders were renewed, and the jurisdiction of the bishops over the clergy, both secular and regular, was more clearly defined.

== Later life, death and legacy ==
Calixtus II devoted his last few years to re-establishing papal control over the Roman Campagna and establishing the primacy of his former prince-archbishopric, the See of Vienne over the long-time rival See of Arles. He also affirmed the authority of the bishop of Lyon over the church at Sens in France, transferred the historic bishopric of Mérida in Spain to Santiago de Compostela, and rebuilt the church of Santa Maria in Cosmedin in Rome.

Calixtus died on 13 December 1124. A decade or two later, a French scholar (probably Aymeric Picaud) began composing a combination of miracle tales, liturgical texts and travelers guide relating to the increasingly popular pilgrimage route from southern France through northern Spain now called the Camino de Santiago. The work (published before 1173) was called the Liber Sant Jacobi (Book of St. James) or the Codex Calixtinus, since a letter introduction attributed to this pope preceded each of the five chapters. Several of his authentic letters have also been preserved.

== See also ==
- Cardinals created by Callixtus II

== Sources ==
- Cate, James Lea (1969) [1955]. "The Crusade of 1101". In Setton, Kenneth M.; Baldwin, Marshall W. (eds.). A History of the Crusades, Volume I: The First Hundred Years. Vol. 1 (Second ed.). Madison, Milwaukee, and London: University of Wisconsin Press. ISBN 0-299-04834-9.
- Grayzel, Solomon (1991). "The Papal Bull Sicut Judeis". In Cohen, Jeremy (ed.). Essential Papers on Judaism and Christianity in Conflict. From Late Antiquity to the Reformation. New York University Press. pp. 231–259.
- Landon, Edward Henry (1909). A Manual of Councils of the Holy Catholic Church. Vol. 2. John Grant.
- de Mesquita, Bruce Bueno (2000). "Popes, kings, and endogenous institutions: The Concordat of Worms and the origins of sovereignty". International Studies Review: 93–118.
- Robinson, I. S. (1990). The Papacy, 1073-1198: Continuity and Innovation. Cambridge University Press. p. 133. ISBN 9780521319225.
- Russell, Jeffrey Burton (1965). Dissent and Reform in the Early Middle Ages. University of California Press.
- Simonsohn, Shlomo (1988). "The Apostolic See and the Jews, Documents: 492–1404". Mediaeval Studies (January). Pontifical Institute of Mediaeval Studies.
- Stroll, Mary (2004). Calixtus II (1119–1124): A Pope Born to Rule. Brill. ISBN 9789004139879.
- Thurston, Herbert (1912). "History of Toleration". The Catholic Encyclopedia. Vol. 14. Robert Appleton Company.

Catholic Church titles
Preceded by Gelasius II	Pope; 1119–24	Succeeded by Honorius II
