= Council of Toulouse (1119) =

The Council of Toulouse, also called the Synod of Toulouse, was convened by Pope Callixtus II in 1119 and attended primarily by prelates from the south of France. The council addressed heresy, a dispute over an abbey, and simony. The decrees condemned anyone who denied the Eucharist, infant baptism, ordination of priests, and lawful marriage as a heretic, but failed to name the heretics. The second Lateran Council in April 1139 reaffirmed the decrees on heresy.

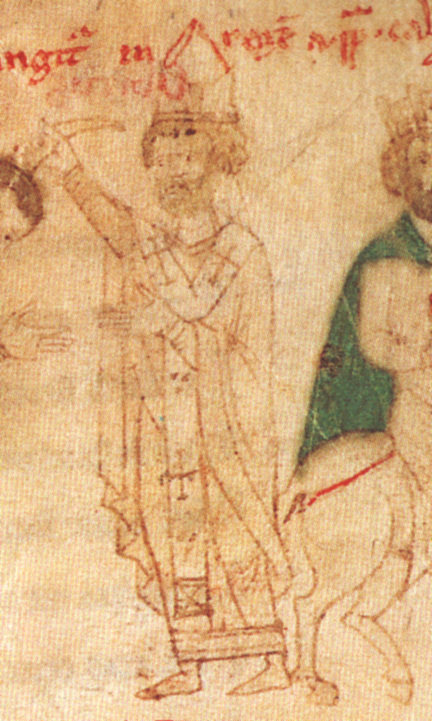
Callixtus II convened the Council of Toulouse

== Council ==
On 5 July 1119, Pope Callixtus II called for a council at Toulouse. It was attended by Atton de Bruniquel, archbishop of Arles, along with most of the prelates from southern France. After being read aloud to the assembled bishops, the canons were promulgated as papal decrees with the agreement of the council.

=== Decrees ===
- No buying or selling of holy orders or benefices.
- Required provosts, archpriests, and deans to be ordained priests, while archdeacons must first be ordained as deacons
- The council anathematizes those who refuse to accept the Eucharist, infant baptism, the clergy and their orders, and the institution of holy matrimony.
- Forbids any secular ruler from claiming the estate of a bishop or cleric.
- Prohibits the enslavement of free individuals.
- No cleric shall be required to render service to a layperson in exchange for an ecclesiastical benefice.
- Forbids the hereditary succession of ecclesiastical offices
- Forbids the charging of fees for holy oil and burial services
- Monks, canons, and clergy are excommunicated if they abandon their religious duties or grow their hair and beard like laypersons.

==== Abbey dispute ====
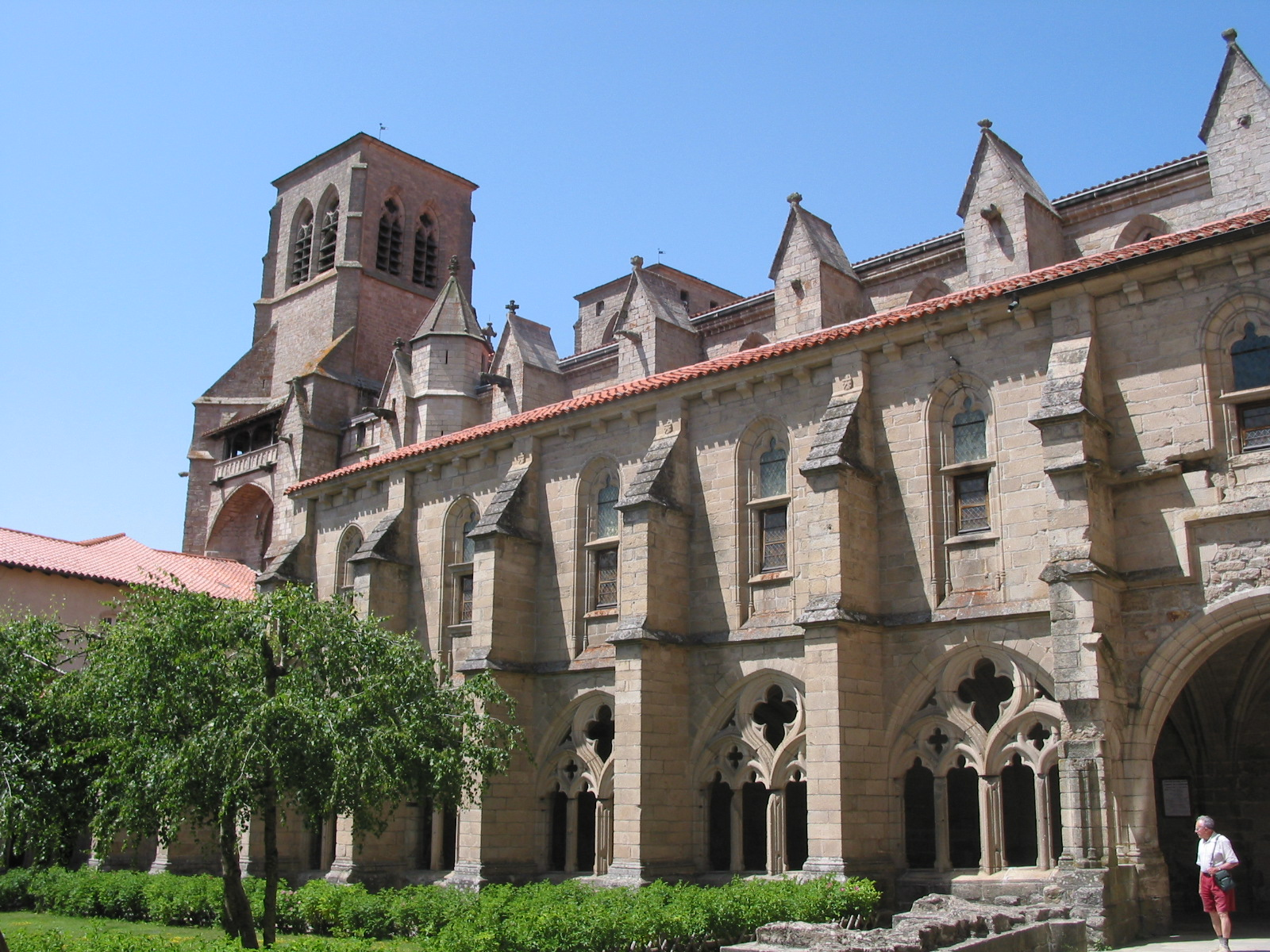
Abbey of La Chaise-Dieu

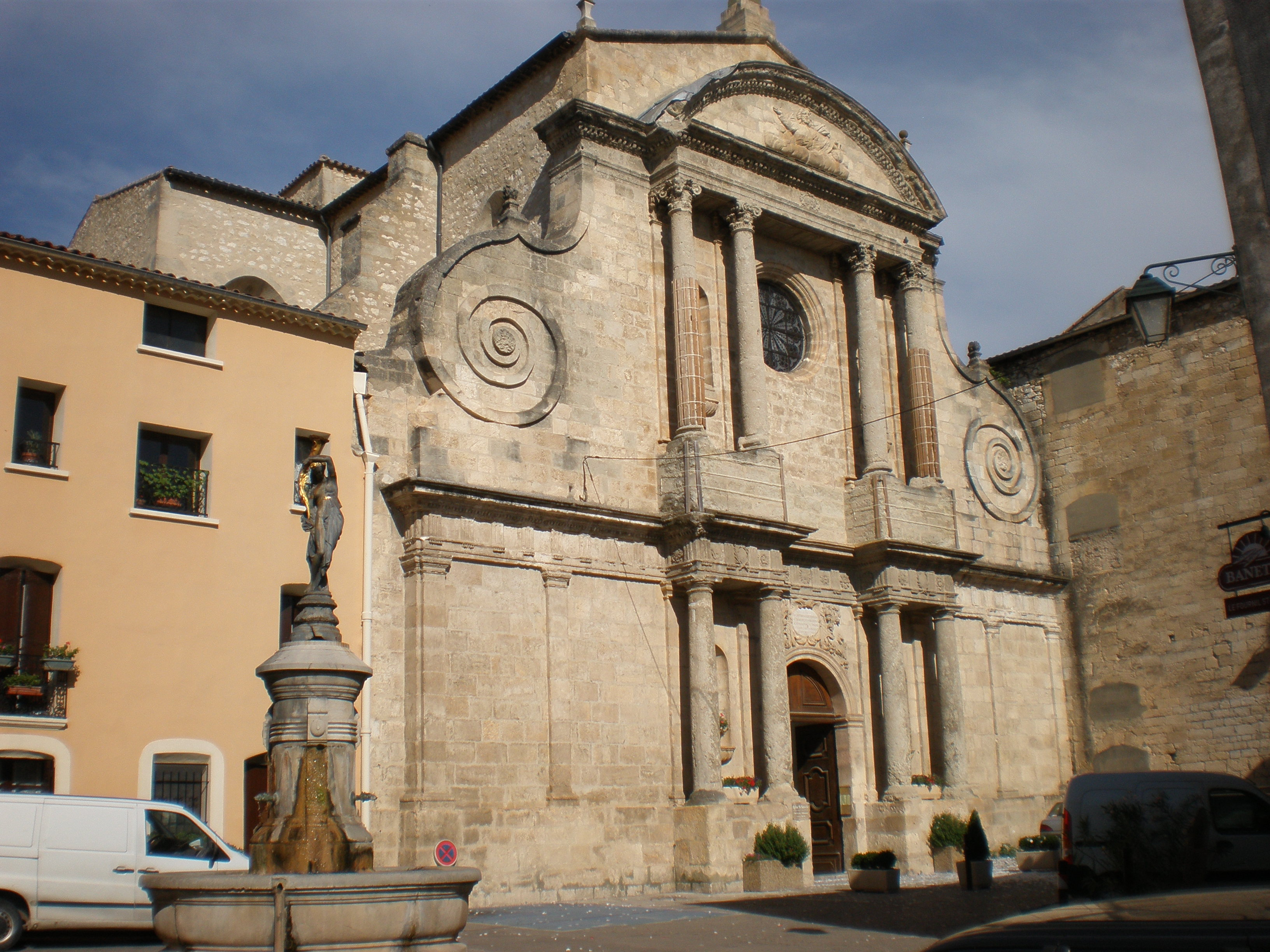
Abbey of Aniane

In resolving the conflict over the priory of Goudargues between the abbeys of Aniane and Chaise-Dieu, Callixtus convened a panel including senior cardinals, archbishops, bishops, and abbots. The council acclaimed their ruling when it was decided.

==== Claims over St. Saturnin ====
In the matter of St. Peter’s Church in Toulouse asserting a claim over St. Saturnin, Callixtus undertook the inquiry himself and withheld judgment until the council had adjourned.

==== Heresy ====
The synod anathematized heretics who repudiated the Eucharist, infant baptism, ordination of priests, and lawful marriage. Heresy had become such a nuisance in southern France, Callixtus convened the council in Toulouse to address the issue. The council decided that heretics, and their defenders, should be restrained through secular authorities.

Despite the explicit nature of the decree, the council failed to specifically name the heretics. Historians have differed in their identification of the group targeted by the decree. Jeffrey Burton Russell contends that these heretics may have been followers of Henry the Monk (Henricians), but probably not Petrobrusians. Marcia L. Colish states it was the Petrobrusians that were an issue in the south of France by 1119, while Grado Giovanni Merlo theorizes that the decree was solely directed at Henricians.

== Legacy ==
The Council of Toulouse determined that opposition to the Eucharist, infant baptism, ordination of priests, and lawful marriage, would be considered heresy. Though limited in scope, the decrees against heresy from the synod were later reissued at the Second Council of the Lateran, and were echoed by a number of twelfth-century provincial councils under papal authority.

== Sources ==
- Brunn (2013). "Résumés des contributions - Abstracts [résumés]". Cahiers de Fanjeaux Année (in French): 649–672.
- Colish, Marcia L. (1972). "Peter of Bruys, Henry of Lausanne, and the Facade of St.-Gilles". Traditio. 28: 451–460.
- Grundmann, Herbert (1995). Religious Movements in the Middle Ages. University of Notre Dame Press. ISBN 9780268080891.
- Lambert, Malcolm (2002). Medieval Heresy: Popular Movements from the Gregorian Reform to the Reformation (3rd ed.). Blackwell Publishing. ISBN 0-631-22275-8.
- Landon, Edward Henry (1909). A Manual of Councils of the Holy Catholic Church. Vol. 2. John Grant.
- Merlo, Grado Giovanni (2014). "Christian Experiences of Religious Non-conformism". In Arnold, John H. (ed.). The Oxford Handbook of Medieval Christianity. Oxford University Press. ISBN 9780191015007.
- Robinson, I. S. (1990). The Papacy, 1073-1198: Continuity and Innovation. Cambridge University Press. ISBN 9780521319225.
- Robinson, I.S. (2004). "The papacy, 1122-1197". In Luscombe, David; Riley-Smith, Jonathan (eds.). The New Cambridge Medieval History. Vol. 4, c.1024 – c.1198, Part 2. Cambridge University Press. pp. 317–383. ISBN 978-0-521-41411-1.
- Rist, Rebecca (2009). The Papacy and Crusading in Europe, 1198-1245. Bloomsbury Publishing. ISBN 9781441179524.
- Russell, Jeffrey Burton (1965). Dissent and Reform in the Early Middle Ages. University of California Press.
- Stroll, Mary (2004). Calixtus II (1119–1124): A Pope born to Rule. Brill. ISBN 9789004139879.
