= Erlembald =

Italian saint

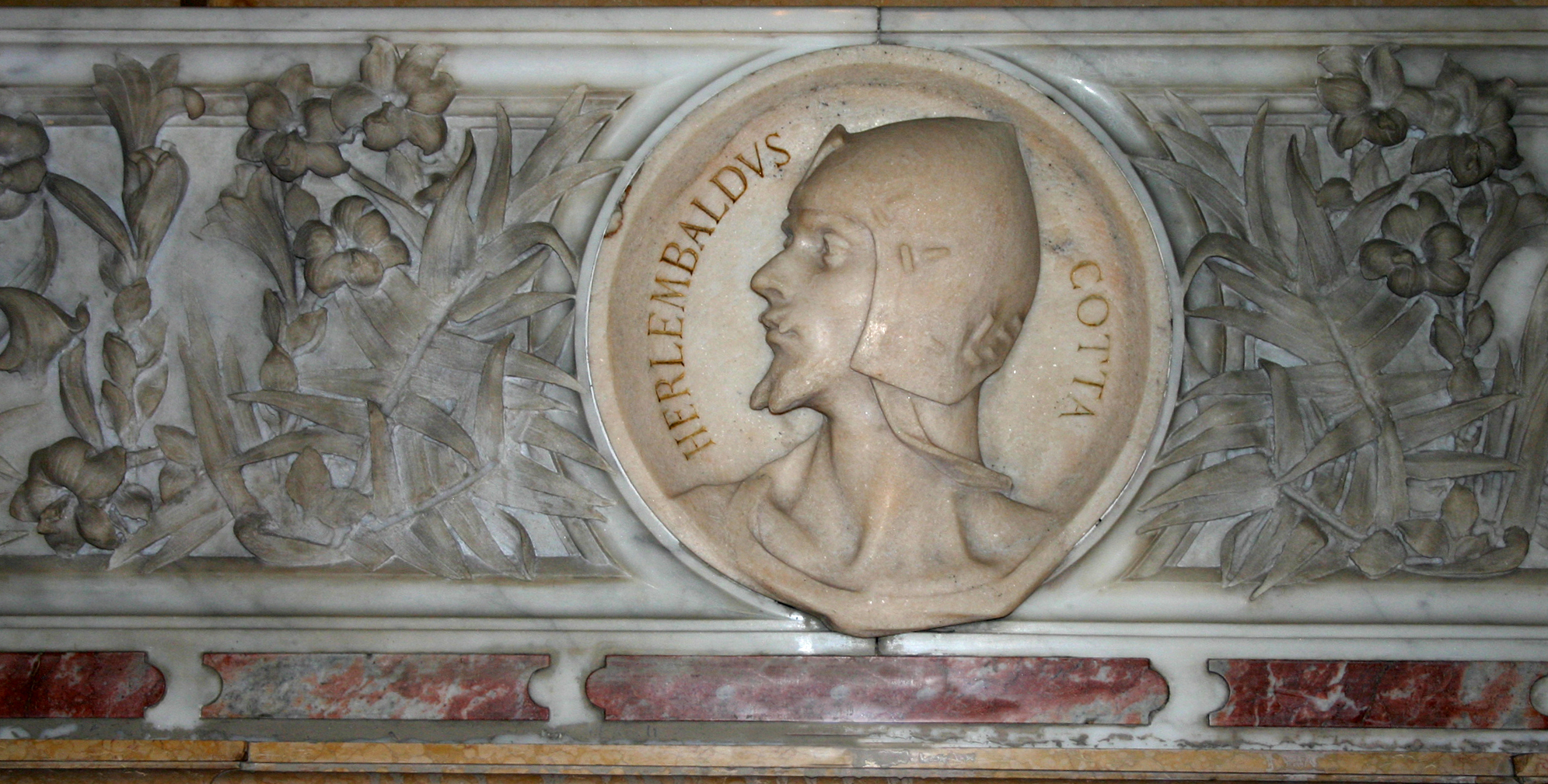
A bust of Erlembaldus Cotta in the Basilica di San Calimero in Milan

Saint Erlembald (or Erlembaldo Cotta) (Sanctus Herlembaldus in Latin) (died 15 April 1075) was the political and military leader of the movement known as the pataria in Milan, a movement to reform the clergy and the church in the Ambrosian diocese.

== Biography ==
He was the brother of Landulf, subdeacon of Milan. They were of the Cotta, a family of valvassores and vassals of the archdiocese. In his early career, Erlembald was referred to as a "captain." In 1063, he returned from a pilgrimage to the Holy Land and intended to become a monk when the deacon Ariald convinced him to take his brother's place at the head of the pataria. Erlembald, however, was not a cleric, but a soldier.

In 1064, he travelled to Rome to confer with Pope Alexander II and confirm his support. On his return to Milan, he revealed the change in the character of the pataria by living in a palace near the church of Saint Victor and the Forty Martyrs. With papal permission he began imposing his will by force on the clergy, by deposing abbots and proceeding against the bishop, Guido da Velate. Guido was first accused of taking false oaths for not acting against simony in his province. Guido, however, organised a resistance to the patarini. Because of this, Ariald imposed the interdict on the city during the feast of the Ascension. The populace turned against him and he fled to Pavia. After being captured en route to Rome, Ariald was executed and his body thrown in Lake Maggiore. On 3 May 1067, Erlembald recovered his body and reburied it in S. Celso in Milan on 17 May. Ariald's popularity was also recovered after the lifting of the interdict. A papal legation lent Erlembald much needed moral support at a congregation at Vallombrosa.

In 1069, Guido renounced the see to Gotofredo da Castiglione with the support of the Emperor Henry IV. Gotofredo was immediately besieged in his castle. On 7 March 1070, violence broke out again in Milan and Gotofredo was arrested. That year, Guido request his archbishopric back from Erlembald. He was refused, but the patarino leader put him in S. Celso and then in the see of Bergoglio. On 6 January 1072, Erlembald appointed Atto archbishop in opposition to the arrested Gotofredo. Strong opposition from the German court evaporated suddenly in 1073 when Henry was troubled by revolts in Saxony and had to cede his rights in Milan to Pope Gregory VII. Gregory confirmed Atto and lent his support to Erlembald.

At this, the height of his power, a fire broke out in the city in April 1075, destroying Milan's cathedral, and was interpreted as divine punishment for supporting the controversial pataria. The opposition factions in Milan signed a pact against Erlembald. He put down the revolt, but was killed in the battle and buried in S. Celso. From 6 to 26 May in 1095, Pope Urban II was present at Milan for the transferral of the relics of the canonised Erlembald to S. Dionigi. He was translated once more in 1528 to the Duomo. His feast day is 27 July.

== Sources ==
- Caravale, Mario (ed). Dizionario Biografico degli Italiani LXIII. Rome.
- Keller, Hagen; Busch, Jörg W. (1993). "ERLEMBALDO, santo". Dizionario Biografico degli Italiani (in Italian). Vol. 43: Enzo–Fabrizi. Rome: Istituto dell'Enciclopedia Italiana. ISBN 978-88-12-00032-6.
