= Liber ad amicum =

11th-century work by Bonizo of Sutri

Liber ad amicum (Note: Translated into English as Letter to a Friend.) is a historical work by Bonizo of Sutri written during the Investiture Controversy. Regarded as one of Bonizo's most well-known and influential works, Liber ad amicum chronicles the life of Pope Gregory VII and papal-imperial relations from the time of Constantine the Great to Gregory. It also details the individual histories of the Patarene movement that Bonizo belonged to and the House of Canossa.

== Composition and publication history ==
Bonizo was an Italian cleric who became the bishop of Sutri in 1078. As a Patarene supporter of Pope Gregory VII and his reforms, Bonizo was driven into exile following Henry IV's invasion of Italy in the Investiture Controversy. Sometime between late 1085 and early 1086, while staying at Matilda of Tuscany's residence and after the death of Gregory, Bonizo began writing Liber ad amicum. Given its title, (Note: Bonizo thought of a friend as one who "shared (his) ideological and spiritual formation within a Patarene community and adhered to that community's ecclesio-political agenda and spiritual norms." Moreover, the anonymous friend to whom Liber ad amicum is addressed is intimated to be a cleric at the end of the text.) he probably intended for the text to be primarily circulated among his fellow Paterenes in Cremona, although it has also been described by some historians as having been written specifically for Matilda.

The text is extant in only one mid-twelfth-century codex likely originating from southern Germany. It was first printed in 1763 in Augsburg by Andreas Felix von Oefele.

== Content ==
Liber ad amicum is primarily an apological biography of Pope Gregory VII. It also sets out to answer two questions posed to Bonizo by the anonymous friend to whom the text is addressed, namely "Why in this time of calamity is the Church not set free?" (Note: The "calamity" probably refers to the Investiture Controversy that began as a power struggle between Pope Gregory VII and Henry IV and was still ongoing at the time of the text's composition.) and "Is there any warrant in the ancient lessons of the holy fathers for a Christian in the past or in the present to fight for religious truth with military arms?"

Based on his reading of the Book of Genesis (specifically chapters 21 and 26), Bonizo argues that Christians must humbly endure persecution from non-Christians but engage in physical violence against heretics. Citing the life of Constantine the Great as an example, he then presents suffering as a necessary component of a Christ-like life.

After briefly discussing several praiseworthy Christian kings and emperors, from Constantine to Henry III (the father of Henry IV), Bonizo accuses Henry IV of being complicit in the oppression of the Patarenes and the murder of their leader, Erlembald, whom Bonizo later likens to Judas Maccabeus. Bonizo proceeds to list a few notable Christian acts of religious violence as recorded in the Historiae Ecclesiasticae Tripartitae Epitome.

In Bonizo's view, the Battle of Civitate that Pope Leo IX had sanctioned is the contemporary standard for holy war. He goes on to praise the unity between the Patarenes and papal reformers such as Gregory and Peter Damian. Bonizo recounts in great detail Gregory's continued opposition to clerical marriage and simony, while arguing that Henry is solely to blame for the current papal-imperial conflict. He also identifies Antipope Honorius II, whom Henry had aligned himself with, as the "evil shall spread over all the inhabitants of the land" that was prophesied by Jeremiah. Finally, Bonizo refutes the claims from Henry's camp that Gregory was illegitimately elected; that he unjustifiably excommunicated Henry; and that he was a false prophet.

== Legacy ==
Liber ad amicum has been described by historians as one of Bonizo's best-known and most influential works. According to I.S. Robinson, it is "perhaps the best known of the polemics of the Investiture Contest" and "it has been identified as a crucial contribution to the eleventh-century debate about holy war." Giovanni Miccoli claimed that it "represents the only original historiographical contribution by Italian ecclesiastical culture from the period of the reform."
