= Roland (bishop of Treviso) =

Medieval Italian cleric

Modern illustration depicting Roland's meeting with Gregory

Roland of Parma was an Italian cleric during the Investiture Controversy. He took the side of the Holy Roman Empire and served as the bishop of Treviso from 1073/1078 until 1089/1096.

Roland came from the upper ranks of the clergy of Parma. In a charter of 1073, Bertha, abbess of San Paolo in Parma, donated property she owned in Berceto to her convent. The act was witnessed by Roland, described as deacon, provost and scholaster (diaconus et praepositus et magister scholarum). He signed immediately after the bishop, Everard, and the archpriest, Gezzo, indicating his position in the ecclesiastical hierarchy of Parma at that time.

Roland probably became bishop around 1077. His predecessor as bishop, Accelinus, is last attested on 2 January 1073. Roland was appointed bishop of Treviso by the King Henry IV sometime between 1073 and 1078. Both Bonizo of Sutri in his Liber ad amicum and Donizo in his Vita Mathildis refer to him simply as "the cleric Roland", Rolandus clericus, when discussing the episode of 1076.

In February 1076, Roland delivered the decisions of the German council of Worms and the Italian council of Piacenza—demanding the pope's abdication—to Pope Gregory VII in Rome. Although Roland had not attended Worms, he was present at Piacenza. He travelled with one of the king's servants, unnamed in contemporary accounts. Roland arrived in Rome just before the Lenten synod (14–22 February), and Gregory had the letter from Henry IV read out at the first session. According to the account of Bonizo, Roland so enraged the assembly that Gregory had to intervene to save his life and end the session. The empress dowager Agnes of Poitou, in a letter to Bishop Altmann of Passau, described the scene as an eyewitness: "the envoys of my son the king came into the synod and, in the presence of all, they told the pope, on my son's behalf, that he should rise and renounce the apostolic see, which he had acquired not canonically but by robbery. They were at once seized by the Romans."

The official record of the Lenten synod of 1078, held from 27 February until 3 March, says that Roland, "who to acquire the honor of a bishop became a crafty ambassador, did not recoil from making a schism between the kingdom and the priesthood", and records his excommunication and deposition. The Lenten synods of 1079 and 1080 repeated the decree of excommunication. Roland is still attested as a canon of the cathedral of Parma in charge of the school in 1080, but by 1081 he had been replaced in this position by Ingo.

On 25 June 1080, Roland signed the decree of the council of Brixen against Gregory VII, adding beside his name the word libentissime, "freely". He is attested as an intervener for Aquileia in a charter of 1081. He attended the synod held by the anti-pope Clement III in Ravenna in 1086. His last appearance is in the record of a placitum held in Treviso on 13 October 1089 by Duke Liutold of Carinthia, who was also Margrave of Verona. His successor as bishop, Gumpold, is mentioned for the first time in the latter half of 1096.

== Sources ==
- Cowdrey, H. E. J. (1998). Pope Gregory VII, 1073–1085. Oxford: Clarendon Press.
- Dempsey, John Andrew (2006). Bonizo of Sutri: Life and Work (PhD dissertation). Boston University. ProQuest 3214924
- Golinelli, Paolo, ed. (2008). Donizone: Vita di Matilde di Canossa. Milan: Jaca Book.
- Lasagni, Roberto, ed. (1999). "Rolando". Dizionario biografico dei Parmigiani. Vol. IV: Porta–Zurti. Parma: PPS. Archived from the original on 2014-05-29.
- Robinson, I. S. (1999). Henry IV of Germany, 1056–1106. Cambridge: Cambridge University Press.
- Sacchelli, Abramo (1977). "Donizone e Parma e il "Rolandus Parmensis clericus" della Vita Mathildis (l. 1297–1316): rilievi all'Affò". Aurea Parma. 61: 205–219.
- Sartoretto, Antonio (1969). Cronotassi dei vescovi di Treviso (569–1564). Treviso: Crivellari.
- Schwartz, Gerhard (1907). Die Besetzung der Bistümer Reichsitaliens unter den sächsischen und salischen Kaisern: mit den Listen der Bischöfe, 951–1122. Leipzig: B. G. Teubner.
