= Battle of Volta Mantovana (1080) =

Battle of the Investiture Controversy

- Part of The Investiture Controversy
Date	15 October 1080
Location	Volta Mantovana, Lombardy, Italy. 45°19′18″N 10°39′32″E
Result	pro-Imperial victory

Belligerents
Holy Roman Empire; A coalition of pro-Imperial Bishops from Lombardy	Pro-papal forces led by the House of Canossa

Commanders and leaders
Archbishop Tedald of Milan (presumed) an illegitimate son of Henry IV	Matilda of Tuscany

Strength
Unknown	Unknown

Casualties and losses
Unknown	Unknown

The Battle of Volta Mantovana was fought on the 15th of October 1080 between troops raised by the schismatic bishops of Lombardy loyal to the emperor Henry IV and to anti-pope Guibert of Ravenna against forces commanded by Matilda of Tuscany. Margravine Matilda was defeated and the pro-Imperial forces gained the upper hand.

== Background ==
The battle took place during the Investiture Controversy opposing the reforming Papacy of pope Gregory VII and his foremost advocate Matilda to Holy Roman Emperor Henry IV. It was one of its opening military clashes, and the first significant battle of the controversy to be fought in Italy. The chronicler Bernold of Constance states clearly that the battle took place the day after Henry IV and his opponent Rudolf of Rheinfelden had clashed in Saxony near Hohenmölsen at the Battle on the Elster. Bernold states the bishops' troops were gathered from "almost the whole of Lombardy". Historian David J Hay has suggested the likely leader of the pro-Imperial troops was bishop Tedald of Milan, whose installation had sparked the controversy in the first place and who had played a key role in the synod of Brixen earlier that summer, promoting the deposition of Pope Gregory VII and the election of Guibert of Ravenna as antipope Clement III. Bonizo of Sutri's Liber ad Amicum indicates an otherwise unknown illegitimate son was commanding the army of the schismatic Lombard bishops, writing "[Henry IV]'s son fought Matilda's excellent forces and defeated them" (eius filius cum exercitus excellentissimus Matilade pugnavit et victoriam obtinuit).

== Battle ==
The exact dynamic of the battle is unknown, as is the number of forces in the field. A very short account of the engagement is available in the Chronicon of the aforementioned Bernold of Constance (who mentions the battle as taking place "apud Vultam propre Mantuam"), while Bonizo provides no geographical location for the battle, and no description of the clash. Volta was the site of a castle and estate ("Curtis") of note once belonging to the house of Canossa, as shown by donations of property and rights over servile labor in Volta made to churches in the diocese of Mantua in 1053 and 1073 by Beatrice of Lorraine, Matilda's mother, and by Matilda herself to the bishop of Mantua in 1079. It is thus possible that the castle was thus garrisoned by forces loyal to Matilda. Bishop Hubald of Mantua was a strong ally of Matilda, and shared in her political fortunes in later years. The battle ended when the pro-Imperial forces put "the knights of the most wise duchess Matilda to flight".

== Aftermath ==
The victory of the pro-Imperial forces allowed Henry IV (whose rival Rudolf had been killed at Hohenmölsen) to enter the March of Verona and the Lombard plains unopposed in the spring of the following year. Henry IV was in Verona in early April 1081, and soon after entered Milan in triumph. Later that year, with Lombardy securely pro-Imperial, Henry began a siege of Rome.
