= Synod of Worms (1076) =

Ecclesiastical synod convened by Henry IV

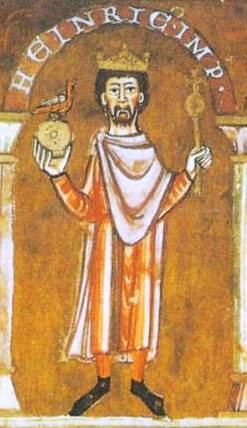
Emperor Henry IV, from a gospel book of St. Emmeram's Abbey (c. 1106)

The Synod of Worms was an ecclesiastical synod and imperial diet (Hoftag) convened by the German king and emperor-elect Henry IV on 24 January 1076, at Worms. It was intended to agree a condemnation of Pope Gregory VII, and Henry's success in achieving this outcome marked the beginning of the Investiture Controversy.

In 1067 Archbishop Guido of Milan, facing the rising forces of the pataria reformers in the city, gave up his see. He recommended the subdeacon Gotofredo da Castiglione his successor, who, however, was excommunicated by Pope Alexander II. While Henry IV appointed Gotofredo in 1070, the patarines elected Atto archbishop. Three years later Pope Alexander II died and was succeeded by Hildebrand of Soana, who named himself Pope Gregory VII. An ardent proponent of the papal supremacy over Henry's emperorship, he promoted the Gregorian Reform as expressed in the Dictatus papae of March 1075, including the principle that the papal title is unique in the world and that it may even be permitted to him to depose emperors.

Nevertheless, when the pataria leader Erlembald died in April 1075, all signals pointed to reconciliation. Not until Henry IV again interfered in the Milan struggles and appointed Tebald da Castiglione archbishop, as well as bishops of Spoleto and Fermo, both on papal territory, the conflict escalated. In December 1075, Pope Gregory sent a harsh letter to Henry, threatening him with excommunication.

Under pressure, the Salian king allied with the German episcopacy, benefitting from their hostile stance on the Gregorian Reform and a centralisation of church authority. Of the 38 German bishops, 24 attended. Led by the primas Germaniae, Archbishop Siegfried of Mainz, Henry's supporters included Bishop Adalbero of Würzburg and Bishop William of Utrecht, as well as the Liège bishop Henri de Verdun. Cardinal Hugh of Remiremont, who had already cut ties with the Pope, spoke damningly against Gregory. On the other hand, Archbishop Gebhard of Salzburg, a supporter of Gregory like Bishop Altmann of Passau, stayed away.

The assembly declared the Pope deposed and the bishops abandoned all obedience to him. Henry had a letter drawn up to Gregory, calling him 'Hildebrand the false monk' and demanding his resignation (descende, descende!). The demand was conveyed to Rome by the cleric Roland of Parma. Three weeks later, the Pope declared Henry deposed and excommunicated him. He released all his subjects from their oath of allegiance, which soon became a serious threat for Henry's authority. In October, the German princes gathered at Trebur and ultimately asked the king to reconcile with the Pope. In January 1077 Henry had to take the Road to Canossa, to salvage his kingship.

== See also ==
- Battle on the Elster
- Concordat of Worms
