= Synod of Brixen =

The Synod of Brixen was a church council held on 15 June 1080 in the episcopal city of Brixen. It was convoked by King Henry IV of Germany at the height of the Investiture Controversy to pass judgement on Pope Gregory VII. The synod issued a decree condemning the pope, demanding his abdication and authorizing his deposition if he refused. The synod also elected his successor, Wibert of Ravenna.

Henry IV was at war with a rival claimant to the kingship, Rudolf of Rheinfelden. At the time of the synod, Rudolf had won a recent victory at the battle of Flarchheim on 27 January 1080. In the aftermath of the battle, Henry sent Archbishop Liemar of Bremen and Bishop Rupert of Bamberg to Rome to confer with Gregory at his annual Lenten synod. Rudolf too sent envoys to Rome. On 7 March, the synod chose to recognize Rudolf as the legitimate king. On 13 April, Gregory VII pronounced Henry excommunicated and gave him until 1 August to repent, else "he would die or be deposed". In response Henry convoked the synod of Mainz that met on 31 May. It recommended removing the pope and electing another.

The main source for the synod of Brixen that followed is the synodal decree, which states that "a meeting of thirty [prelates] and of secular princes not only of Italy but also of Germany was assembled by royal command". The assembled prelates included 29 bishops from the Holy Roman Empire and one priest, Hugh Candidus, representing the College of Cardinals. All the kingdoms of the empire were represented. There were twenty bishops from Italy, eight from Germany and one from Burgundy. Henry IV was also present at Brixen with an armed force of Germans and Italians. The precedent for the king calling a council was to be found in the synod of Sutri that Henry's father, Henry III, had held in 1046.

The choice of Brixen (Bressanone) was based on the loyalty of its bishop, Altwin, to Henry IV's cause, as well as its geographical location. It lay south of the Brenner Pass in the extreme south of the Kingdom of Germany and was easily accessible to the Italians. Henry IV arrived at Brixen directly from the synod of Mainz. Most of the bishops who had convened in Mainz sent letters or envoys to Brixen to join in the condemnation of the pope.

As he had at the synod of Worms in 1076, Hugh Candidus gave evidence at Brixen concerning Gregory VII's misdeeds. He accused him of using any means necessary to obtain the papacy, including simony, violence, heresy, necromancy and murder. He was specifically accused of poisoning his four predecessors. He had usurped his archidiaconate at Rome. He attended obscene shows. The latest crime was that of the Lenten synod, in which he had approved of the death of the king and lent support to a traitor, Rudolf. Although the most scurrilous accusations are rejected by modern scholarship, not all of the accusations contained in the synodal decree was a fabrication for propaganda purposes. The accusations regarding Gregory's actions at Lent were both serious and true.

The synodal decree has some of the character of a minutes, since it provides a chronological outline of the synod. The final sentence on Gregory was that he "should be canonically deposed and expelled and condemned in perpetuity, if, having heard this [decree], he does not step down." All the prelates attending but two signed the decree. Henry IV signed the decree after the bishops.

== Signatories ==
The following list is derived from Gresser 2006, pp. 205–206, and Geary 2016, pp. 527–528.

1. Hugh Candidus, cardinal-priest of San Clemente al Laterano
2. Tedald of Milan
3. Cono of Brescia
4. Otto of Tortona
5. William of Pavia
6. Reginald of Belluno
7. Sigebod of Verona
8. Denis of Piacenza
9. Udo of Asti
10. Hugh of Fermo
11. Milo of Padua
12. Conrad of Utrecht
13. Henry of Aquileia
14. Didald of Vicenza
15. Regenger of Vercelli
16. Rupert of Bamberg
17. Norbert of Chur
18. Everard of Parma
19. Roland of Treviso
20. Arnulf of Cremona
21. Arnulf of Bergamo
22. Tiedo of Brandenburg
23. Liemar of Bremen
24. Werner of Bobbio
25. Altwin of Brixen
26. Meginward of Freising
27. Burchard of Lausanne
28. Conrad of Genoa
29. Henry IV of Germany

Archbishop Wibert of Ravenna and Bishop Benno of Osnabrück attended but did not subscribe the decree.

== Sources ==
- Blumenthal, Uta-Renate (1988). The Investiture Controversy: Church and Monarchy from the Ninth to the Twelfth Century. University of Pennsylvania Press.
- Cowdrey, H. E. J. (1998). Pope Gregory VII, 1073–1085. Clarendon Press.
- Geary, Patrick, ed. (2016). Readings in Medieval History (5th ed.). University of Toronto Press.
- Gresser, Georg (2006). Die Synoden und Konzilien in der Zeit des Reformpapsttums in Deutschland und Italien von Leo IX. bis Calixt II. 1049–1123. Ferdinand Schöningh.
- Robinson, I. S. (1999). Henry IV of Germany, 1056–1106. Cambridge University Press.
