= Isolino Partegora =

Lake island in Italy

Coordinates: 45°46′8″N 8°34′40″E

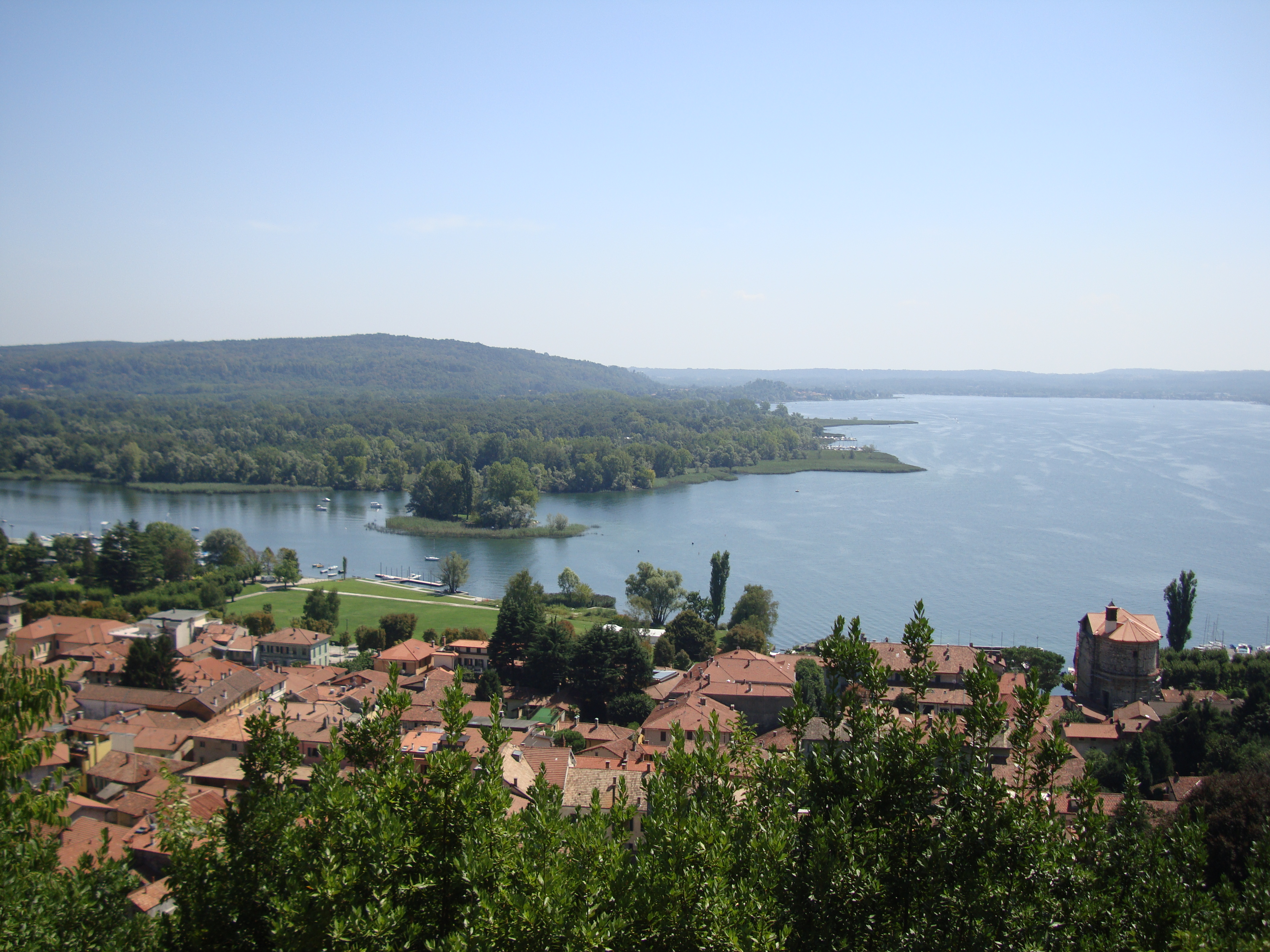
View of the Angera gulf

Isolino Partegora is an islet situated at the centre of the gulf of Angera on Lago Maggiore, the only island on the lake to fall within the Italian region Lombardy. There is a sandy beach at the southern edge of the island.

The trees on the island are poplars and most of the shoreline consists of reed beds. On the east side stands a temple-shaped monument in pink granite with the Crivelli coat of arms, a reference to a former owner, Count Crivelli. The island was once known as Isolino Crivelli. In 1945 it was donated to Angera Comune by the then owner, Attilio Brovelli, in memory of his sons who died during World War II. The island is a refuge for water birds, particularly cormorants and coots, and a colony of cormorants lives there.

The islet is about 96 by 36 metres (105 by 39 yards) in size, with an area of roughly 3,500 square metres (4,200 square yards).

Sass margunin, or margunée, is a submerged erratic block lying some tens of metres to the west of the island.

There is a tradition that in 1066 Saint Arialdo, founder of the religious pataria movement, was martyred on the island. It is said that he was killed by the men of the nephew of the archbishop of Milan, Guido da Velate. There is an annual commemoration of the martyrdom in the form of a procession of illuminated boats to the island. It is also said that the saints Giulio and Giuliano stopped on the island.

Near the shore facing the island is the Bruschera natural park. The park contains one of the last remaining flooded forests in Lombardy, consisting of willows and black alder trees. In 1776 the scientist Alessandro Volta discovered marsh gas, or methane, during a boat trip in the area.
