= Davino =

Davino may refer to:

== Surname ==
- Duilio Davino (born 1976), Mexican footballer
- Eduardo Davino (1929–2011), Italian Roman Catholic bishop
- Flavio Davino (born 1974), Mexican footballer
- Roberval Davino (born 1954), Brazilian footballer

== Given name ==
- Davino Verhulst (born 1987), Belgian football (soccer) goalkeeper
