= Liemar =

Archbishop of Hamburg-Bremen from 1072 to 1101

Liemar (unknown – 16 May 1101, in Bremen) was archbishop of Hamburg-Bremen from 1072 to 1101, and an important figure of the early Investiture Contest.

He was a supporter of Emperor Henry IV from 1073. In 1074 the papal legates Gerald of Ostia and Hubert of Palestrina put pressure on him to hold a local synod; he resisted, was suspended, and by 1075 his views against papal interference with bishops had hardened. In 1080, he attended the Synod of Brixen that condemned Pope Gregory VII. With Benno II of Osnabrück he commissioned the anti-papal polemic of Wido of Osnabrück around 1085. Liemar was one of many bishops who was irked by Gregory VII's encroachment of episcopal autonomy. In a letter to Bishop Hezilo of Hildesheim, Liemar complained that Gregory VII was ordering his bishops about 'as though they were his bailiffs'.

== Notes ==
Liemar Born: unknown in Bavaria? Died: 16 May 1101 in Bremen
Catholic Church titles
Preceded by Adalbert, Count Palatine of Saxony	Archbishop of Bremen; 1072–1101	Succeeded by Humbert
