= Tedald =

Tedald, Tedaldo, or Tedaldus may refer to:

- Tedald of Canossa (died 1012), Italian Count of Brescia; of Modena, Ferrara, and Reggio; and of Mantua
- Tedald (bishop of Arezzo) (c. 990–1036), son of Tedald of Canossa
- Tedald (archbishop of Milan) (died 1085)

== See also ==
- Theudoald
