= Epistolae Vagantes =

- Author: Pope Gregory VII
- Language: Latin
- Subject: History
- Published: 1972
- Publisher: Clarendon Press

The Epistolae Vagantes is a letter collection containing Pope Gregory VII's correspondence that was not included in his register.

The collection was edited by H. E. J. Cowdrey in 1972, and printed by the Clarendon Press, in the Oxford Medieval Series. Each of Gregory's Latin letters is accompanied by an English translation by Cowdrey, whose work on the edition significantly contributed to the advancement of his career and the modern understanding of religion in the Middle Ages.

== See also ==
- Ephraim Emerton
