= Hubert of Palestrina =

Italian papal legate and Cardinal

Hubert of Palestrina was an Italian papal legate and Cardinal. He was created bishop of Palestrina in 1068. He was legate, with Gerald of Ostia, to the Emperor Henry IV, for Pope Gregory VII; a temporary reconciliation was achieved in 1074 They also asserted papal authority over Liemar, archbishop of Bremen.
