= Tedald (archbishop of Milan) =

Tedald was archbishop of Milan (died in Milan on 25 May 1085) from 1075 to 1085.

== Early life ==
Tedald was born into a noble family in Milan. He entered into the service of King Henry IV of Germany who employed him in the royal chapel.

== Archbishop ==
Henry IV made Tedald archbishop of Milan in 1075. When appointing Tedald to the archbishopric, Henry ignored his former decision about the appointment of another cleric, Godfrey, to the same see. The King also disregarded the claim of Pope Gregory VII's candidate, Atto, to the archbishopric. The suffragan bishops consecrated Tedald archbishop.

Tedald approached Pope Gregory, seeking the Pope's "friendship" in a letter, but the Pope was unwilling to acknowledge the royal investiture. On 8 December, Gregory forbade the Archbishop's suffragan bishops to consecrate Tedald and summoned Tedald to Rome to give an account of his appointment. The Pope regarded Tedald as a rebel and a renegade and accused him of claiming the see of the lawful archbishop, Atto.

The Pope excommunicated Tedald at an unknown date.

Henry IV made his three-year-old son, Conrad, his lieutenant in Italy before returning to Germany early in 1077. On the same occasion, the King appointed Tedald and Denis, Bishop of Piacenza, as his son's guardians. Tedald's excommunication was renewed at the Lenten synods of Rome in 1078, 1079 and 1080.

Tedald was one of the nineteen Italian prelates to attend the synod that Henry IV held at Brixen on 25 June 1080. The assembled prelates declared that Pope Gregory VII's election had been invalid. Historian David J Hay has suggested Tedald was the leader of the coalition of Lombard bishops that defeated Matilda of Tuscany at the battle of Volta Mantovana in October 1080.

Tedald and his suffragans appointed one thousand knights to accompany King Henry to Rome in 1082.

Tedald died in Milan on 25 May 1085 (on the same day as Pope Gregory VII).

== Sources ==
- Cowdrey, H. E. J. (2004) [1998]. Pope Gregory VII, 1073–1085. Clarendon Press. ISBN 0-19-820646-1.
- Malegam, Jehangir (2013). The Sleep of Behemoth: Disputing Peace and Violence in Medieval Europe, 1000-1200. Cornell University Press. ISBN 978-0-8014-5132-4.
- Robinson, I. S. (2003) [1999]. Henry IV of Germany, 1056–1106. Cambridge University Press. ISBN 0-521-54590-0.
- Hay, David J. (2008). The Military Leadership of Matilda da Canossa. Manchester University Press. ISBN 978-0719073595.
