= Bonizo of Sutri =

Italian bishop and writer (c.1045-c.1094)

Bonizo of Sutri or Bonitho (c.1045–c.1095) was a Bishop of Sutri and then of Piacenza in central Italy, in the last quarter of the 11th century. He was an adherent of Gregory VII and an advocate of the reforming principles of that pope. He wrote three works of polemical history, including Liber ad amicum, which detailed the struggles between civil and religious authorities. He was driven out of both of his dioceses, once by the emperor and once by opponents of Gregorian-style reform.

== Life ==
Bonizo was born about 1045, though there is no documentary material referring to the date of his birth, or the place, or of his family. It is argued that he was a native of Milan in Northern Italy. Early in his life he associated himself with the reform group known as the Pataria.

Bonizo took part in several councils held in Rome. He was present in Rome at a synod of Pope Alexander II, probably the one held in February or March 1073.

On 27 November 1074, Pope Gregory wrote a letter to Bishop Dionysius of Piacenza, advising him that he was sending legates (who were carrying the letter) in order to settle several long-running disputes which raged in that diocese, and occasioned accusations in the Papal Court. These disputes included the Bishop, on the one side, and the Abbot of S. Sepulcro; the People of Piacenca; and the subdeacon Bonizo. Bishop Dionysius was the leading opponent in Lombardy of the reforming party of which Gregory VII had just become the head. It is conjectured that the subdeacon was the future Bonizo of Sutri. Bonizo was present at the Roman synod of February 1075, in which Bishop Dionysius was deposed.

He was soon appointed by the Pope to the episcopal see of Sutri. The earliest reference to him as Bishop of Sutri is found in the dedicatory inscription of the church of S. Thomas in Cremona, on 3 October 1078. He was serving as papal legate at the time. He was present in Rome during the discussions about the doctrines concerning the eucharist promoted by Berengar of Tours, just before the Roman synod of November 1078.

In the struggle between Gregory VII and Emperor Henry IV, he was on the side of the pope. He was seized by Henry in late April 1082, and entrusted to the custody of the antipope Clement III, Archbishop Wibert of Ravenna. About a year afterwards Bonizo made his escape, and lived for several years under the protection of Countess Matilda of Tuscany.

In 1086, he was present in Mantua at the funeral of his friend Anselm of Lucca, who had died on 18 March 1086. He was, soon after, elected to the see of Piacenza by the Pataria, but owing to strong opposition was unable to take possession of it until the year 1088, when he was strongly supported by Pope Urban II. His enemies, however, contrived to have him blinded and maimed in July 1090.

He seems to have died in Cremona in 1094 or 1095.

== Writings ==
- The "Paradisus", or extracts from the writings of St. Augustine (still unpublished)
- a short treatise on the sacraments
- In Hugonem schismaticum, now lost, probably against the schismatic Cardinal Hugo Candidus
- a description of the various classes of judges in the Roman Empire and in the Roman Church
- the Liber ad amicum, a polemical work, in which the author relates events of his own times, down to 1085 or 1086.
- "De Vitâ Christianâ", also called the "Decretum", a work in ten books on ecclesiastical law and moral theology written at the request of a certain priest Gregory. It was written after Liber ad amicum, which it summarizes at the beginning of the treatise.

== Bibliography ==
- Berschin, Walter (1972). Bonizo von Sutri (in German). Berlin: de Gruyter. ISBN 978-3-11-001758-8.
- Dempsey, John Andrew (2006). Bonizo of Sutri: Life and Work. Boston MA USA: Boston University.
- Fournier, P. (1915). "Bonizo de Sutri, Urbain II et la comtesse Mathilde d'après le Liber de vita Christiana de Bonizo," Bibliotheque de I'Ecole des Chartes 76 (1915), pp. 265–298. (in French)
- Gatto, Ludovico (1971). Matilde di Canossa nel liber ad amicum di Bonizone da Sutri (in Italian). Modena: Aedes Muratoriana.
- Lehmgrübner, Hugo (1887). Benzo von Alba, ein Verfechte der kaiserlichen staatsidee unter Heinrich IV: sein leben und der sogenannte "Panegyrikus". Excurs: Das Leben des Benizo von Sutri (in German). R. Gaertners Verlagsbuchhandlung (H. Heyfelder). pp. 129–149.
- Robinson, Ian (2004). The Papal Reform of the Eleventh Century: Lives of Pope Leo IX and Pope Gregory VII. Manchester England UK: Manchester University Press. pp. 36–50. ISBN 978-0-7190-3875-4. [English translation of Liber ad amicum on pp. 158–261.]
