= Pandulf of Capua (monk) =

The earliest known illustration of a person working on an abacus is found at the end of Pandulf's treatise De calculatione in a Vatican manuscript. It may represent Pandulf himself.

Pandulf of Capua (Latin: Pandulfus Capuanus) was a monk and learned author at the Abbey of Monte Cassino in the late 11th century.

== Life ==
Pandulf was a native of Capua. His contemporary at Monte Cassino, Peter the Deacon, included an entry on him in his biographical dictionary of Cassinese monks, De viris illustribus casinensis coenobii. According to Peter, Pandulf was a presbyter who became a monk under Abbot Desiderius (r. 1058–1087) and was active during the reigns of the Byzantine emperors Michael VII Doukas (r. 1071–1078) and Alexios I Komnenos (r. 1081–1118). He was "learned in divine and secular literature" and Peter attributes 25 titles to him. One of these titles, De Agnete imperatrice, was probably written in honour of the visit to Monte Cassino by the Empress Agnes of Poitou in or about 1072–1073. It must have been competed before her death in 1077. Another chronological indication is the reference to Pandulf's dedication of his work De calculatione to Peter, abbot of San Benedetto in Salerno, who is known to have become abbot in the period 1064–1067.

The date and place of his death is unknown, but probably fell during the reign of Alexios I.

== Works ==
=== List ===
The 25 titles attributed to Pandulf by Peter the Deacon are (original spelling retained):

- De calculatione
- Versus de termino pasche Hebreorum
- De cyclo solari ad concurrentes inveniendos
- De cyclo lunari
- De feria pasche Hebreorum invenienda
- Ad annos Domini inveniendos
- Qualiter sint inveniende indictiones
- De luna cuiusque diei invenienda, absque embolismorum contrarietate
- Quomodo fallunt qui se scire putant quot horis vel punctis luna in unaquaque nocte luceat
- Quibus modis cursus solis dividatur
- Quomodo efficiatur bissextus
- Ad ferias calendarum inveniendas
- Qualiter vel unde regule ad ferias mensium inveniendas precedant
- Quomodo regula terminorum Hebreorum ex cursu solis inveniatur
- Ad feriam uniuscuiusque diei inveniendam
- De quadtuor temporibus
- In quibus datariis solstitia veraciter esse debent
- Ubi equinoctia veraciter credantur esse
- Quomodo adventum Domini sit inveniendus
- Ud lidtera ebdomadarum per totum annummemoriter inveniatur
- Quomodo Christus sit passus in tertio calendas Aprilis
- Quomodo anni ab origine mundi omnes falluntur
- Qualiter luna quintadecima non pertinet ad illum diem, quo facta fuit
- De assumtione sancte Marie
- De Agnete imperatrice

A majority of these titles, over 20, concern the computus. De calculatione concerns computation, which Pandulf describes as "so useful ... that our study of the computus, and arithmetic, and music, geometry also, and astronomy, use it as if it were an alphabet." De Agnete imperatrice may have been a work of history. Like most works bearing on the Empire or the Papacy and written at Monte Cassino in the late 11th century, it is lost.

=== De calculatione ===
Pandulf's only surviving work, De calculatione, survives in a single manuscript, Ottobonianus latinus 1354. It is a pedagogical text aimed at showing even children how to solve multiplication problems by using an abacus. Among the authorities he cites are Gerbert of Aurillac, Heriger of Lobbes and Bede. A manuscript of Heriger and Bede acquired by Monte Cassino in the 1060s may be the one that Pandulf consulted. It is still at Monte Cassino, now MS 189. In addition, although he does not cite him, Pandulf almost certainly made use of Lawrence of Amalfi's treatise on the abacus, De divisione, and may even have considered his own work a supplement to the former. He may also have drawn inspiration from Martianus Capella's Marriage of Philology and Mercury.

Pandulf's nine numerals with their Latin names enclosed in decorative frames

Typically for an 11th-century, Pandulf used markers marked with Hindu–Arabic numerals for his abacus. He recommends having a bag containing 90 markers. He introduces the innovation that these markers come in different shapes. The 1–3 markers are triangular, the 4–6 markers rectangular and the 7–9 markers circular. The purpose of this is unclear. Craig Gibson and Francis Newton suggest that it may have merely facilitated finding the right marker in the bag.

Pandulf presents a uniques series of glyphs for the Arabic numerals. He explains that the glyphs for 1–6 have the same number of strokes as their value, while seven looks like a capital S (from Latin septenarius) and eight has the two O's of octonarius stacked. The glyphs for 4–7 in Pandulf's system do not correspond to those in any other preserved Hindu–Arabic system. Gibson and Newton speculate that he may have invented or adapted the shapes for mnemonic purposes and included his mnemonic device in the treatise to assure that the forms were not corrected by later scribes. Alternatively, his shapes may reprsent a distinct tradition not otherwise preserved, perhaps connected to Constantine the African, who was active in Capua and Monte Cassino at the same time.

De calculatione is also notable for a casual reference to chess: "when dice and chess have been put aside, you may play wisely on the abacus." Gibson and Newton suggest that this was "intended to appeal to the student by its analogy with the pursuits of aristocratic leisure."

An English translation has been published.

== Bibliography ==
- Cowdrey, H. E. J. (1983). The Age of Abbot Desiderius: Montecassino, the Papacy, and the Normans in the Eleventh and Early Twelfth Centuries. Clarendon Press.
- Dell'Omo, Mariano (2014). "Pandolfo da Capua". Dizionario Biografico degli Italiani (in Italian). Vol. 80: Ottone–Pansa. Rome: Institute of the Italian Encyclopaedia. ISBN 978-88-12-00032-6.
- Gibson, Craig A.; Newton, Francis (1995). "Pandulf of Capua's De calculatione: An Illustrated Abacus Treatise and Some Evidence for the Hindu-Arabic Numerals in Eleventh-Century South Italy". Mediaeval Studies. 57: 293–335.
