= Arialdo =

Italian saint

Saint Arialdo
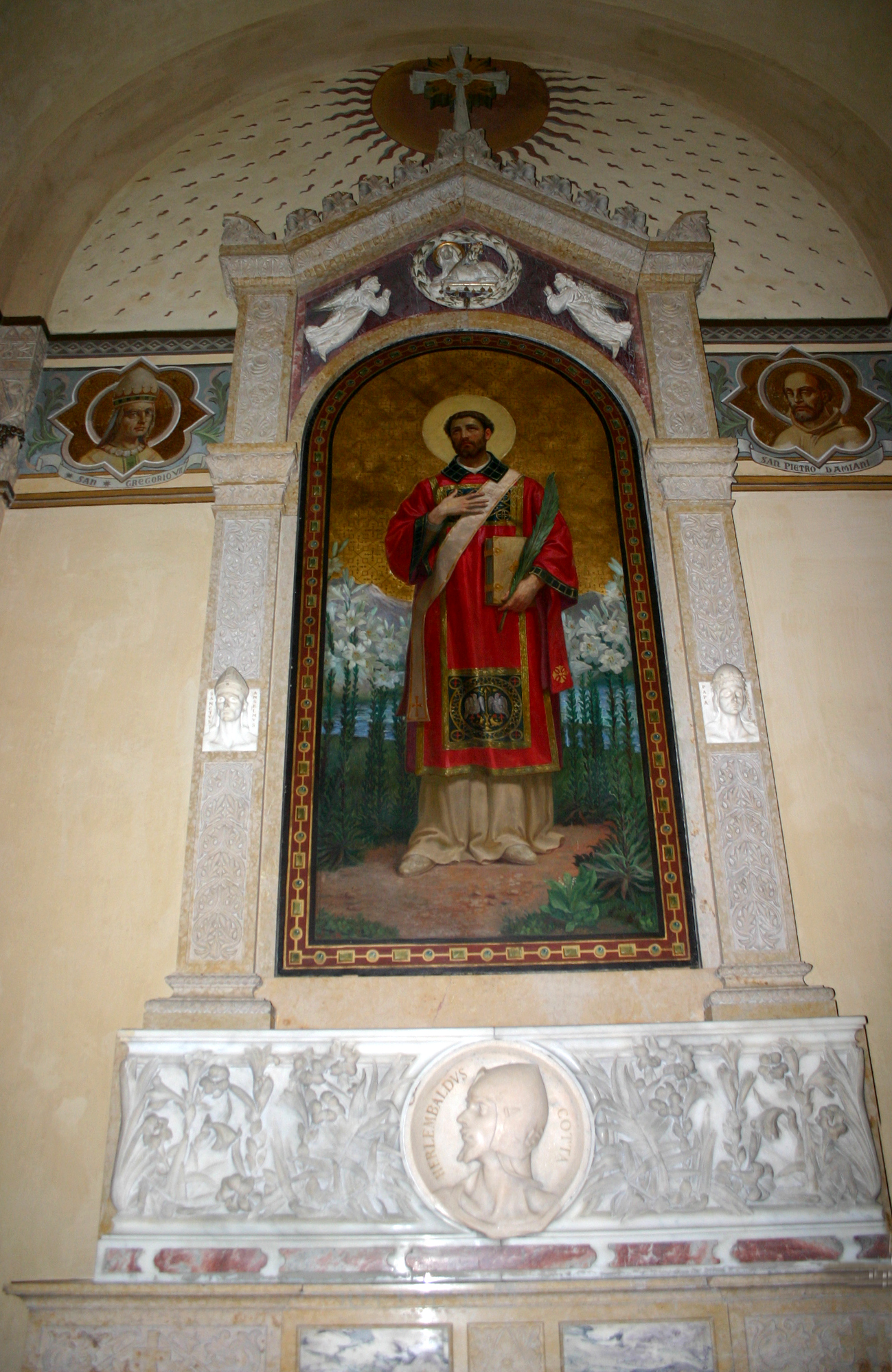
- Arialdo da Carimate. Altar in the "Basilica di San Calimero" in Milan

Deacon and martyr
- Born: c. 1010 unknown
- Died: 27 June 1066; Isolino Partegora, Lago Maggiore
- Venerated in: Catholic Church; Eastern Orthodox Church
- Canonized: 1067 by Pope Alexander II; 9 September 1836 (confirmation of cult) by Pope Gregory XVI
- Major shrine: Cathedral of Milan
- Feast: 27 June
- Attributes: Depicted in the vestments of a deacon, holding the palm of martyrdom

Saint Arialdo (c. 1010 – 27 June 1066) is a Christian saint of the eleventh century. He was assassinated because of his efforts to reform the Milanese clergy.

== Life ==
Arialdo was the child of a noble family, born in Cutiacum (Cucciago), near Como. After studying in Laon and Paris, he was made a canon in the cathedral city of Milan. According to Andrea da Parma, abbot of San Fedele di Strumi, who wrote a Vita concerning Arialdo, the church in Milan was rife with immoral clerics, fornicating, sleeping with prostitutes, lending money, and selling indulgences. According to Henry Charles Lea, marriage was commonplace among the Milanese clergy.

Together with the Bishop of Lucca Anselmo da Baggio (later Pope Alexander II), Arialdo headed the pataria, a movement that sought to reform Milan's simoniacal clergy. Due to this, he was excommunicated by the Bishop of Milan Guido da Velate. Pope Stephen IX removed the excommunication, and Arialdo returned to Milan to continue his efforts towards reformation. In 1069, the Pope sent Peter Damiani as legate to attempt a resolution. The issue then became less a matter of clerical conduct than the authority of Rome over Milan. Damiani was able to demonstrate that the city's beloved patron St Ambrose had acknowledged the precedence of the papacy.

Eventually, these endeavours led to bishop Guido da Velate's excommunication. While travelling to Rome, Arialdo was set up by emissaries of Guido and killed.

== Veneration ==
Ten months after the assassination, his body was found in Lago Maggiore (allegedly in a perfect state of preservation and emitting a sweet odour). It was carried to Milan and exposed in the church of St. Ambrose from Ascension to Pentecost. Subsequently, Arialdo's body was interred in the church of St. Celsus, and in the following year, 1067, Pope Alexander II declared him a martyr.

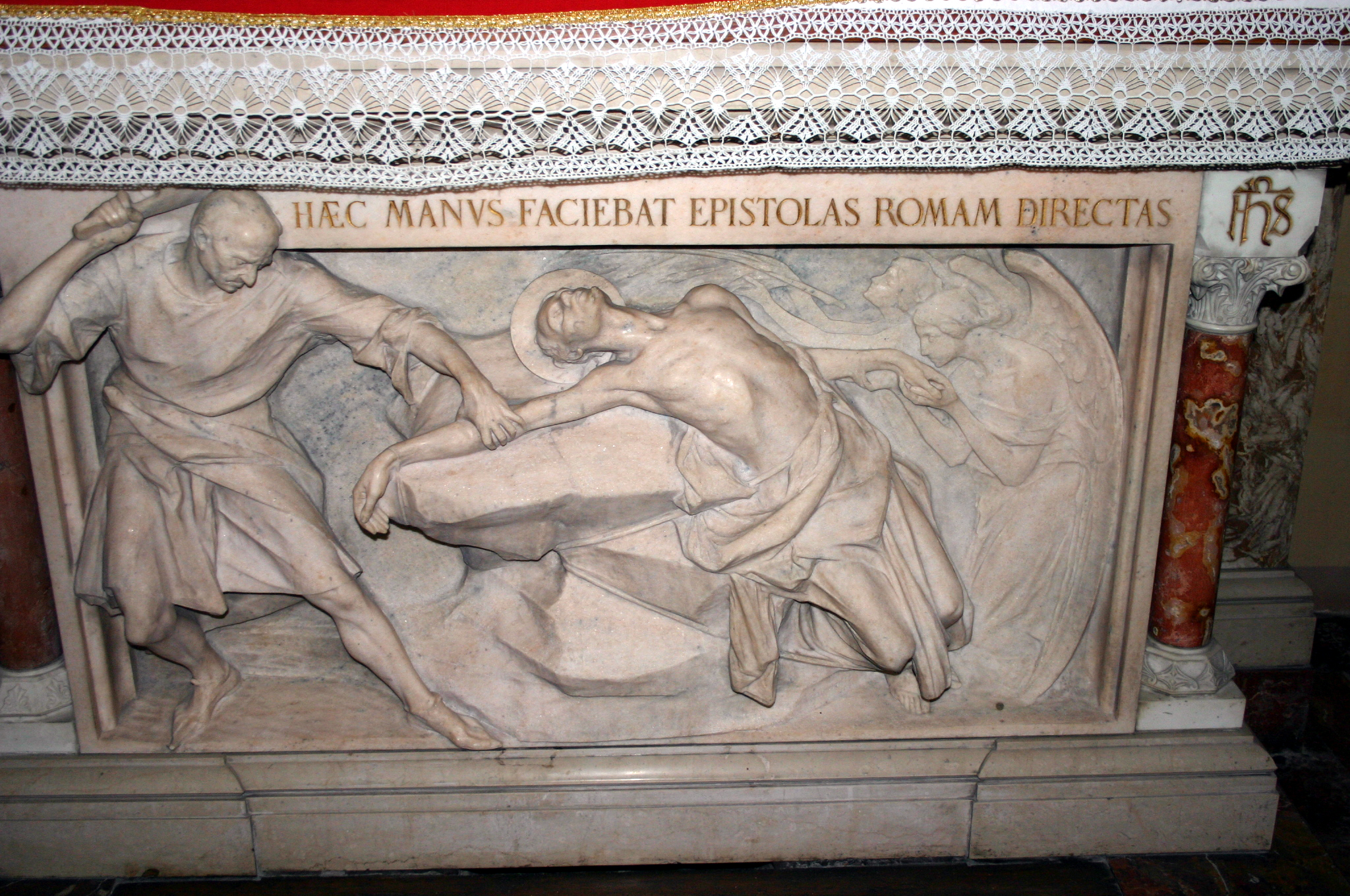
Arialdo's martyrdom (Basilica di San Calimero, Milan).

== See also ==
- Roman Catholic Archdiocese of Milan
