= Palestrina Cathedral =

Church building in Palestrina, Italy

Coordinates: 41.8390°N 12.8920°E

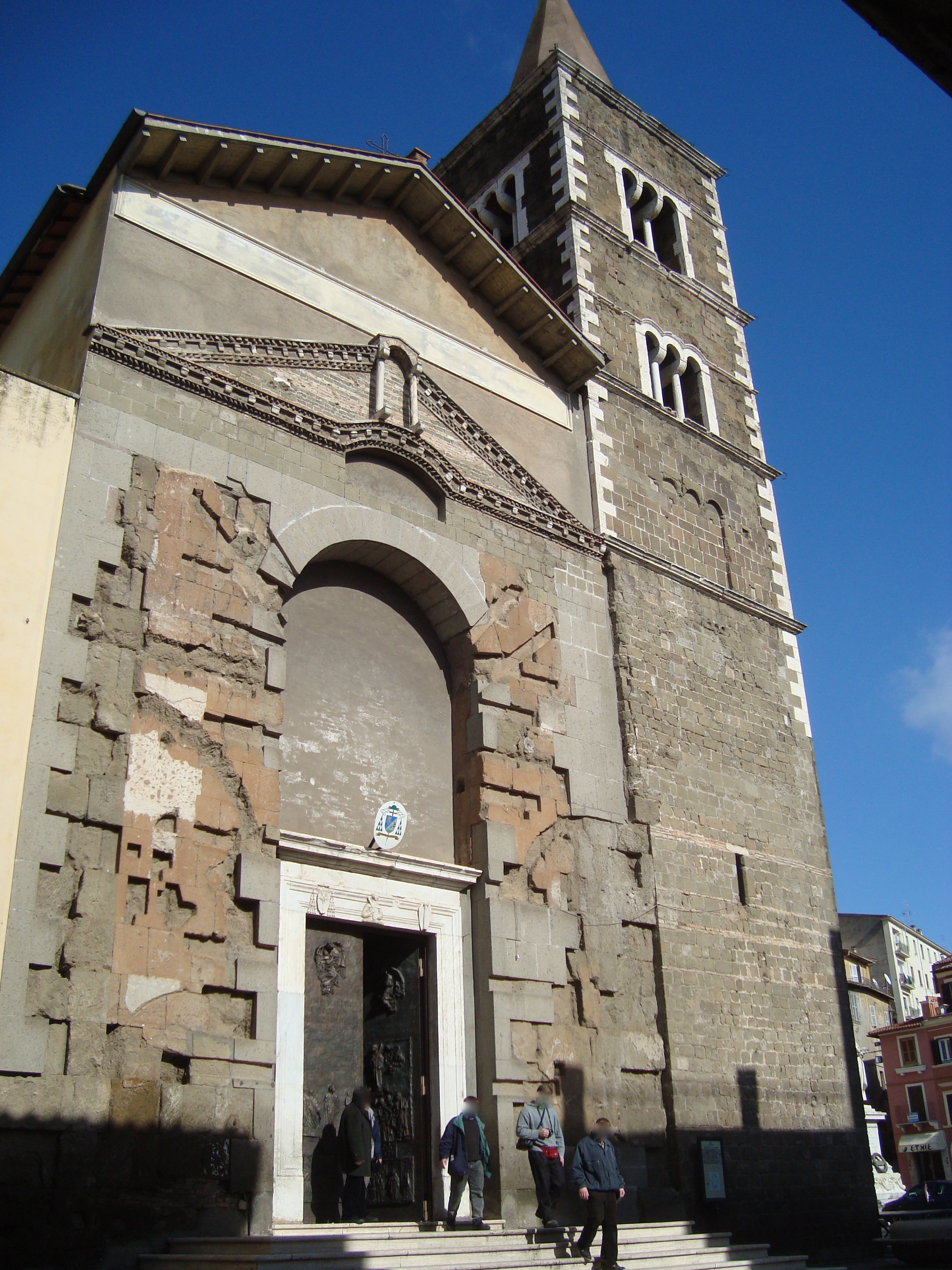
Palestrina Cathedral

Palestrina Cathedral (Italian: Duomo di Palestrina; Cattedrale di Sant'Agapito martire) is a Roman Catholic cathedral located in Palestrina, in the region of Lazio, Italy. It is the episcopal seat of the Suburbicarian Diocese of Palestrina, and dedicated to Saint Agapitus.

== History and description ==
The church was built into the ruins of a temple, perhaps dedicated to Jupiter, located in the ancient Roman forum of Praeneste. Documents cite the transfer in 898 of the relics of Saint Agapitus, since moved to the interior of the Basilica cimiteriale extramoenia delle Quadrelle. The original paleo-Christian church was enlarged by bishop Conone with the addition to two lateral aisles and the construction of a crypt in the presbytery. The basilica was consecrated on 16 December 1117 by Pope Pasquale II. During the civil conflicts in 1437 between the Colonna family and the papacy, part of the facade including the bell-tower was razed, and the relics of Saint Agapitus were taken to what is now Tarquinia. A century later, they were returned at the request of Cardinal Marcantonio Colonna and Pope Sixtus V. They are housed in a bejeweled bust of silver, and displayed in a public procession in honor of the saint held every 18 August.

The facade, originally Romanesque in style, has a portal built in 1505. It displays the heraldic coat of arms of Cardinal Girolamo Bassi della Rovere, depicting Agapitus and his palm of martyrdom adjacent to the coat of arms of the Colonna family. The interior nave is decorated with medallions depicting Bishops of Praeneste, while the windows depict saints and martyrs associated with the town. Among the altarpieces are one depicting the Decapitation of Sant’Agapito by Carlo Saraceni (last chapel on right), a Crucifixion with the Virgin and St Lawrence and a Savior by Girolamo Siciolante da Sermoneta. The frescoes around the main altar depict the life of Saint Agapitus by Domenico Bruschi. In the left nave is a stucco replica of the Pietà di Palestrina by Michelangelo.

Giovanni Pierluigi da Palestrina was organist of the cathedral from 1544 until 1551.
