= Patarenes =

Patarenes may refer to:

- members of the Pataria, 11th-century religious movement in the Archdiocese of Milan in northern Italy
- heretics better known as Cathars, members of a Christian dualist sect
- members of the Bosnian Church, considered to be a part of the Cathar movement by Italian writers against heresy
