= Mario Cecchini (bishop) =

Italian Catholic bishop (1933–2021)

- Bishop of Fano-Fossombrone-Cagli-Pergola
- Church: Catholic Church
- Diocese: Diocese of Fano-Fossombrone-Cagli-Pergola
- In office: 11 February 1986 – 8 September 1998
- Predecessor: Costanzo Micci
- Successor: Vittorio Tomassetti

Orders
- Ordination: 16 March 1958 by Umberto Ravetta
- Consecration: 16 March 1986 by Bernardin Gantin

Personal details
- Born: 25 January 1933 Piticchio di Arcevia, Province of Ancona, Kingdom of Italy
- Died: 13 January 2021 (aged 87) Senigallia, Province of Ancona, Italy

Mario Cecchini (25 January 1933 – 13 January 2021) was an Italian Catholic bishop.

== Life ==
Cecchini was born in Italy and was ordained to the priesthood in 1958. He served as bishop of the Diocese of Fano-Fossombrone-Cagli-Pergola from 1986 until his resignation in 1998.

He died of COVID-19 in Senigallia during the COVID-19 pandemic in Italy.
