= Hugh of Remiremont =

French medieval cardinal

Hugh of Remiremont (c.1020 – c.1099), called Candidus or Blancus (both meaning "the white"), was a medieval cardinal.

Born in Lorraine, Hugh became a Benedictine at Remiremont Abbey, whence he was summoned to Rome by Pope Leo IX and created Cardinal-Priest of San Clemente in 1049.

After the death of Pope Nicholas II in 1061, he adhered to the antipope Cadalous, but quickly submitted to Pope Alexander II. In 1063 he was sent as papal legate to Spain and southern France, where he stayed until 1068.

On his way to Spain he presided over synods at Auch, Toulouse, Girona, and Barcelona. In Spain he was successful in enforcing celibacy among priests and introducing the Roman in place of the Mozarabic liturgy, but being accused of simony he was recalled to Rome.

In 1072 he was sent as legate to France, where he again committed acts of simony. He succeeded, however, in exculpating himself before Alexander II and his successor Pope Gregory VII. He had wielded great influence upon the election of the latter and was sent by him as legate to France and Spain in 1073. On this embassy he committed new acts of simony.

From ca. 1075 he was a bitter antagonist of Gregory VII, who finally deposed him on 3 March 1078 and replaced him in his titulus. He took a prominent part in the anti-Gregorian synod of Worms in 1076 and synod of Brixen in 1080 and was repeatedly excommunicated by Gregory VII. Then he joined the obedience of Antipope Clement III and subscribed his bull dated 4 November 1084 as cardinal of S. Clemente. In 1085 he was legate of antipope in Germany.

He became bishop of Fermo c.1084 and then was transferred to the suburbicarian see of Palestrina by Clement III ca. 1089. He participated in the schismatic council at Rome in August 1098. His name appears for the last time among the signatories of the bull of Clement III dated 18 October 1099.
