= Eduardo Davino =

Italian Roman Catholic bishop

- Bishop of Palestrina
- Church: Catholic Church
- Diocese: Suburbicarian Diocese of Palestrina
- In office: 10 November 1997 – 24 March 2005
- Predecessor: Vittorio Tomassetti
- Successor: Domenico Sigalini
- Previous post: Bishop of Ariano Irpino-Lacedonia (1993-1997)

Orders
- Ordination: 27 July 1952 by Alfonso Castaldo
- Consecration: 9 October 1993 by Michele Giordano

Personal details
- Born: 6 August 1929 Naples, Province of Naples, Kingdom of Italy
- Died: 20 January 2011 (aged 81)

Eduardo Davino (6 August 1929 – 20 January 2011) was the Roman Catholic bishop of the Roman Catholic Diocese of Palestrina, Italy.

Ordained to the priesthood in 1952, he was ordained a bishop in 1993. Davino was appointed bishop of the Palestrina Diocese in 1997 and retired in 2005 Bishop Dabino died on January 20, 2011.
