= Suburbicarian Diocese of Palestrina =

Roman Catholic diocese in Italy

Suburbicarian Diocese of Palestrina Praenestina

Catholic
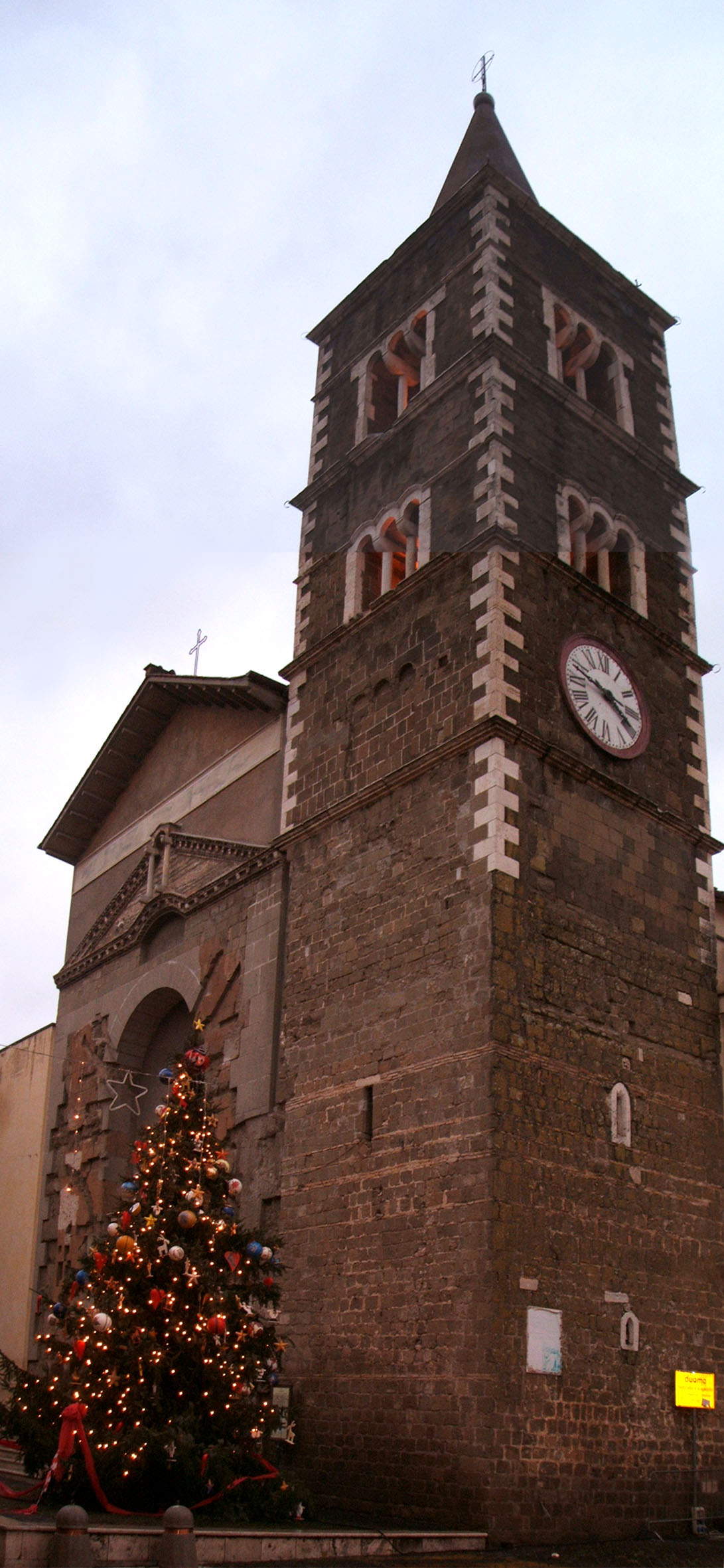
- Palestrina Cathedral

Location
- Country: Italy
- Ecclesiastical province: Rome

Statistics
- Area: 380 km^{2} (150 sq mi)
- Population: Total; Catholics: (as of 2004); 113,000 (est.); 110,500 (est.) (97.8%)
- Parishes: 49

Information
- Denomination: Catholic Church
- Rite: Roman Rite
- Established: 4th century
- Cathedral: Basilica Cattedrale di S. Agapito Martire
- Secular priests: 54 (diocesan); 46 (Religious Orders)

Current leadership
- Pope: Leo XIV
- Bishop: José Saraiva Martins (Cardinal-bishop); Domenico Sigalini (Diocesan bishop)

Map
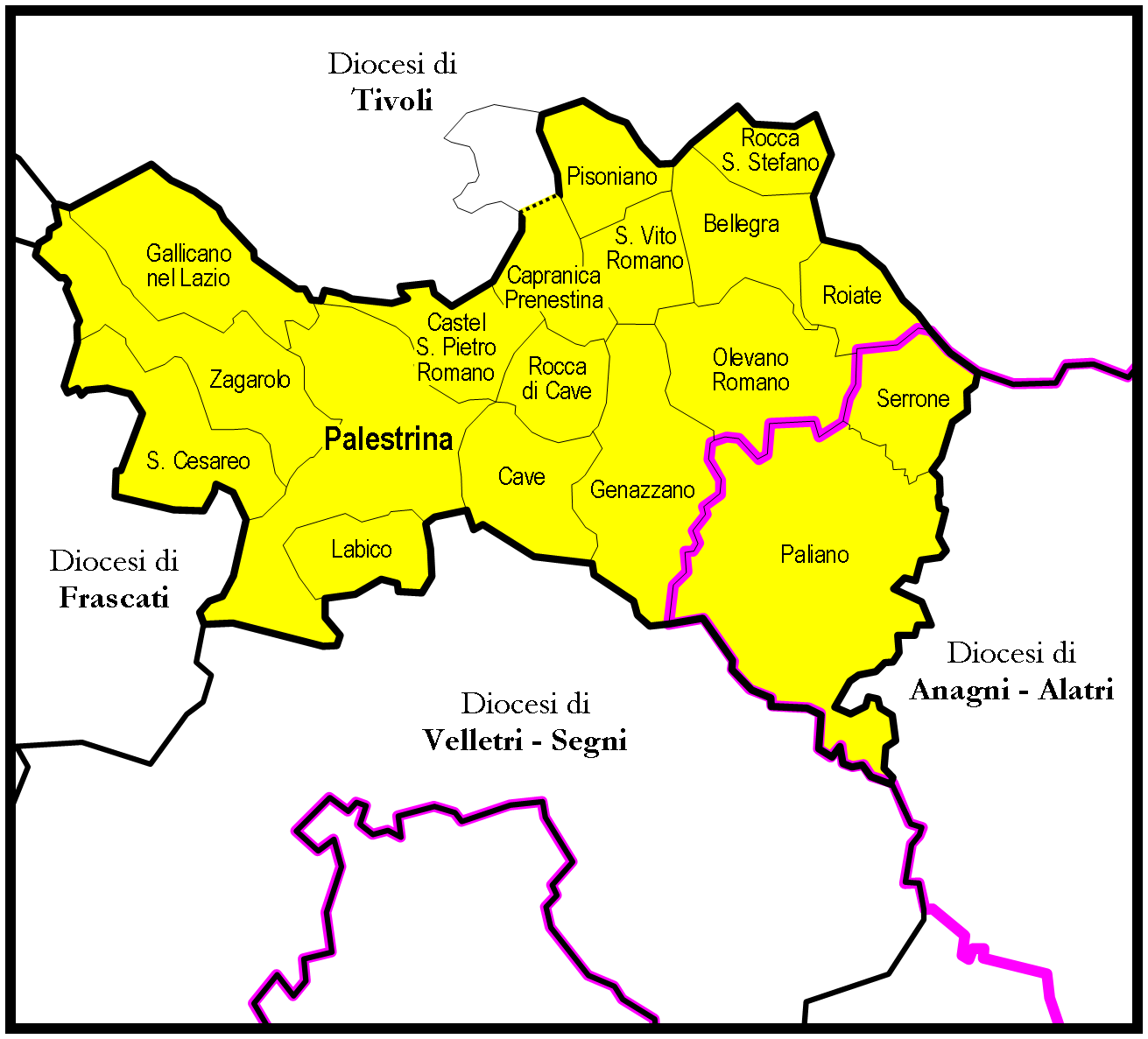

Website
- www.diocesipalestrina.it

The Suburbicarian Diocese of Palestrina (Latin: Diocesis Praenestina) is a Latin suburbicarian diocese centered on the comune of Palestrina in Italy.

The current bishop of Palestrina is Mauro Parmeggiani, who was appointed by Pope Francis on 19 February 2019. Prior to his appointment, he had served as Apostolic Administrator following the resignation of his predecessor, Bishop Emeritus Domenico Sigalini, on 31 July 2017 due to age.

== History ==
Palestrina was looted in 1473.

During the 17th century, the comune of Palestrina was the family territory of a number of Italian noble families including the Barberini, Colonna and d'Este families (which regularly intermarried). Members of these families are represented throughout the list of diocese Bishops, especially between 1600 and 1800. Barberini Pope Urban VIII appointed a number of relatives and close supporters to the Palestrina diocese and governmental positions.

Palestrina is one of the six suburbicarian dioceses of Rome, each traditionally assigned to a cardinal as titular bishop. Although this is a high-ranking position—one of only six in the Order of Cardinal Bishops—since 1972, the title has been purely honorary. The governance of the diocese is now entrusted to a residential bishop, as ordained in the Motu Proprio "Suburbicariis Sedibus" and the cardinal bishop no longer exercises actual authority over its administration.

== Bishops ==
=== To 1000 ===
- Maurus (558)
- Sergio (721)
- Venanzio 732
- Gregorio 761–767
- Andrea 769–773
- Contantinus 826
- Leone 914–928
- Teofilo 963 – before 988
- Stefan 988
- Peter 996–1015

=== 1001–1200 ===
- Johannes I 1036–1039
- Johannes II 1044
  - Raniero 1058 (pseudocardinal, created by antipope *?)
- Bruno 1059–1060
- Bernhard 1061–1065
- Loperto 1066–1069
- vacant 1069–1073
- Uberto Belmonte 1073–1082
- [Berardo (?) ca.1092 (?)]
  - Ugone Candido 1089–1099 (pseudocardinal)
- Milone 1095/98–1104
- vacant 1104–1107
- Cuno of Praeneste 1107–1122
- Guillaume Praenestinus 1123–1137
  - Johannes 1130–1134 (pseudocardinal)
- Étienne de Châlons 1139–1144
- Guarino Foscari 1144–1158
- Giulio I 1158–1164
- vacant 1164–1176
  - Vibiano 1168–1173 (pseudocardinal)
- Manfredo de Lavagna 1176–1178
- vacant 1178–1179
- Benerede 1179–1180
- Paolo Scolari 1180–1187
- vacant 1188–1191
- Giovanni III da Anagni 1190–1196
- vacant 1196–1200
- Guy de Paré, O.Cist. 1200–1204

=== 1201–1400 ===
- Guido Papareschi 1206–1221
- Guido II Pierleoni 1221–1228
- Giacomo di Pecorari, O.Cist. 1231–1244
- Stephen Báncsa 1251–1270
- Vicedominus de Vicedominis 1273–1276
- Erard de Lézinnes 1278–1279
- Girolamo I Masci 1281–1288, later Pope Nicholas IV
- Bernardo V Berardi di Cagli 1288–1291
- Simon I Beaulieu 1294–1297
- Teodorico Raineri 1299–1306
- Pierre III de la Chapelle Taillefer 1306–1312
- Guillaume II de Mandagot 1312–1321
- Pierre IV Despres 1322–1361 (Pierre des Prés, Peter de Pratis)
- Raymond de Canillac 1361–1373
- Simon Langham 1373–1376
- Jean du Cros 1377–1378 (in the obedience of Avignon until 1383)
- Francesco Moricotti Prignani 1380–1394 (Roman Obedience)
- Gui de Malsec 1384–1412 (Avignon Obedience)
  - Angelo Afflicti 1395–1401 (administrator) (Roman Obedience)

=== 1401–1600 ===
- Oddo Colonna 1401–1405 (administrator)
- Antonio I Gaetani 1405–1409, † 1412 (Bishop of Porto 1409–1412)
- Angelo de Sommariva, O.S.B.Cam. 1412–1428
- vacant 1428–1431
- Hugues de Lusignan 1431–1436, † 1442 (Bishop of Frascati 1436–1442)
- vacant 1436–1444
- Giovanni IV Tagliacotio 1444–1449
- Giorgio de Flisco 1449–1455
- vacant 1455–1460
- Juan de Torquemada 1460–1463, † 1468 (Bishop of Albano c. 1464 and Bishop of Sabina 1463–1468)
- vacant 1463–1465
- Alain de Cotivy 1465–1472, † 1474 (also Bishop of Sabina 1472–1474)
- Angelo Capranica 1472–1478
- Marco Balbo 1478–1491
- Jean Balue 1491 (Bishop of Albano 1483–1491)
- Giovanni VII Micheli 1491–1492, † 1503 (Bishop of Albano 1491, Bishop of Porto 1492–1503)
- Girolamo Basso della Rovere 1492–1503, † 1507 (Bishop of Sabina 1503–1507)
- Lorenzo Cybo de Mari 1503 (Bishop of Albano 1501–1503, Bishop of Frascati 1503)
- Antonio Pallavicini Gentili 1503–1507 (Bishop of Frascati 1503–1505)
- Giovanni Antonio Sangiorgio 1507–1508, † 1509 (Bishop of Frascati 1505–1507, Bishop of Sabina 1508–1509)
- Bernardino Lopez de Carvajal 1508–1509 (Bishop of Frascati 1507–1509, of Sabina 1509–1521 and of Ostia and Velletri 1521–1523)
- Guillaume Briçonnet 1509–1511 (Bishop of Albano 1507–1508 and of Frascati 1509–1510)
- Marco Vigerio, O.Min. 1511–1516.
- Francesco II Soderini 1516–1523 (Bishop of Albano 1516–1517, of Porto 1523 and of Ostia and Velletri 1523–1524)
- Alessandro Farnese 1523
- Antonio Maria Ciocchi del Monte 1523–1524 (Bishop of Albano 1521–1523 and of Sabina 1524)
- Pietro Accolti 1524, † 1532 (Bishop of Albano 1623–1524 and of Sabina 1524–1532)
- Marco Cornaro 1524
- Lorenzo Pucci 1524–1531 (Bishop of Albano 1524)
- Giovanni Piccolomini 1531–1533, † 1537 (Bishop of Albano 1524–1531, of Porto 1533–1535 and of Ostia and Velletri 1535–1537)
- Andrea della Valle 1533–1534 (Bishop of Albano 1533)
- Bonifacio Ferreri 1534–1535, † 1543
- Lorenzo Campeggio 1535–1537, † 1539 (Bishop of Albano 1534–1535 and of Sabina 1537–1539)
- Antonio Sanseverino 1537–1539, † 1543 (Bishop of Sabina 1539–1543 and of Porto 1543)
- Giovanni Vincenzo Caraffa 1539–1541
- Alessandro Cesarini 1541–1542
- Francesco III Cornaro 1542–1543
- Giovanni Maria Ciocchi del Monte 1543–1550
- François Louis de Bourbon de Vendôme 1550–1557
- Federigo Cesi 1557–1562, † 1564
- Giovanni Morone 1562–1564, † 1580 (Bishop of Albano 1560–1561, of Sabina 1561–1562, of Frascati 1562, 1564–1565, of Porto 1565–1570 and of Ostia and Velletri 1570–1580)
- Cristoforo Madruzzo 1564–1570, † 1578 (Bishop of Albano 1561–1562, of Sabina 1562–1564 and of Porto 1570–1578)
- Otto Truchsess von Waldburg 1570–1573 (Bishop of Albano 1562–1570 and Sabina 1570)
- Giulio della Rovere 1573–1578 (Bishop of Albano 1570 and of Sabina 1570–1573)
- Giovanni Antonio Serbelloni 1578–1583, † 1591 (Bishop of Frascati 1583–1587, of Sabina 1578, of Porto 1587–1589 and of Ostia and Velletri 1589–1591)
- Giovanni Francesco Gambara 1583–1587 (Bishop of Albano 1580–1583)
- Marco Antonio Colonna 1587–1597
- Giulio Antonio Santori 1597–1602

=== 1601–1800 ===
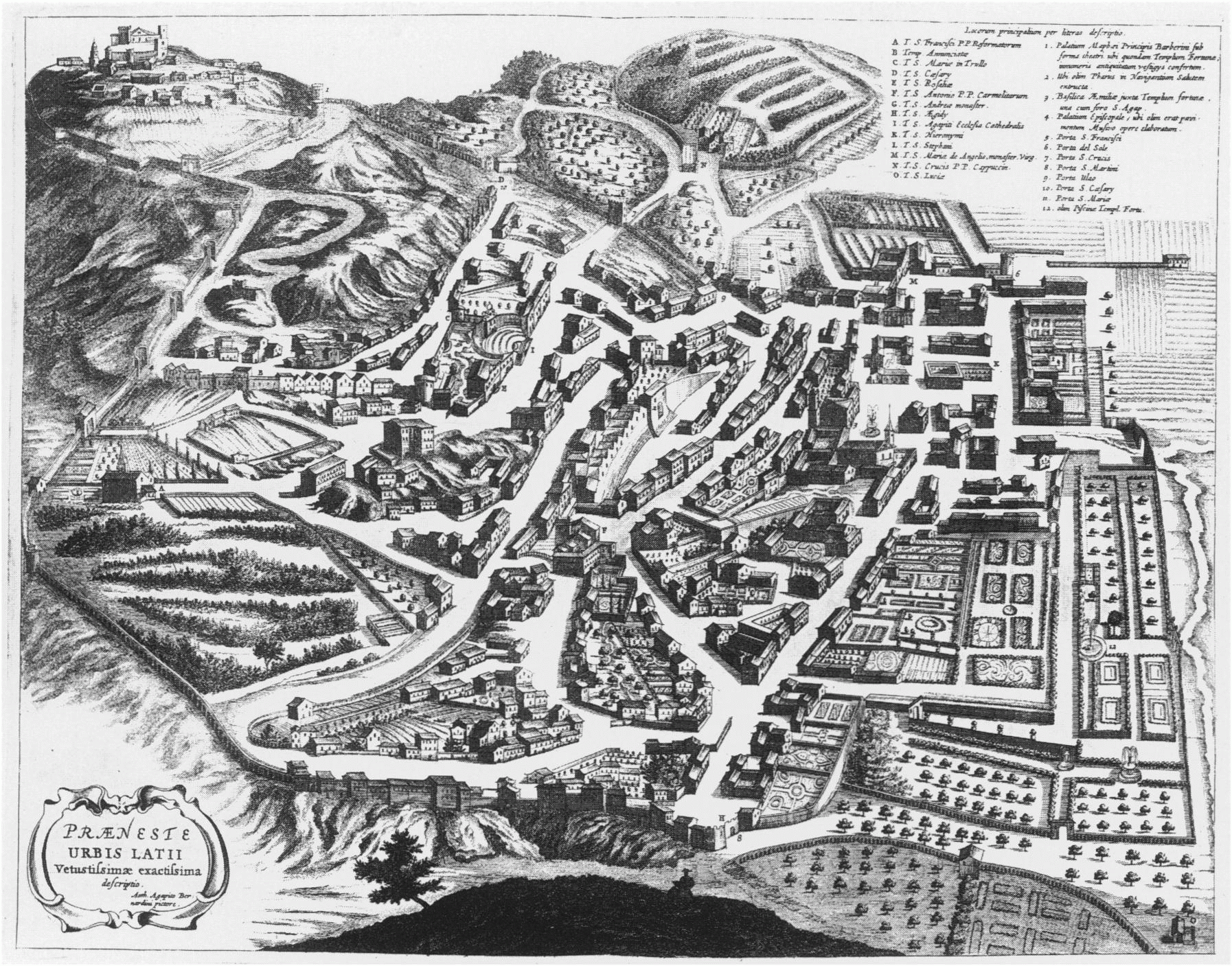
Palestrina as it appeared in 1671

- Alessandro Ottaviano de' Medici 1602–1605 (Bishop of Albano 1600–1602)
- Agostino Valeri 1605–1606
- Ascanio Colonna 1606–1608
- Antonio Maria Galli 1608–1611, 20 (Bishop of Frascati 1605–1608, of Porto 1611–1615 and of Ostia and Velletri 1615–1620)
- Gregorio Petrocchini 1611–1612
- Benedetto Giustiniani 1612–1615, (Bishop of Sabina 1615–1620 and of Porto 1620–1621)
- Francesco Maria Del Monte 1615–1621, (Bishop of Porto 1621–1623 and of Ostia and Velletri 1623–1625)
- Ottavio Bandini 1621–1624, (Bishop of Porto 1624–1626 and of Ostia and Velletri 1626–1629)
- Andrea Baroni Peretti Montalto 1624–1626, (Bishop of Albano 1626–1627 and of Frascati 1627–1629)
- Domenico Ginnasi 1626–1629, (Bishop of Porto 1629–1630 and of Ostia 1630–1639)
- Marcello Lante della Rovere 1629, (Bishop of Frascati 1629–1639, of Porto 1639–1641 and of Ostia 1641–1652)
- Pier Paolo Crescenzi 1629–1641, † 1645 (Bishop of Porto 1641–1645)
- Guido Bentivoglio 1641–1644
- Alfonso de la Cueva Albuquerque 1644–1655
- Bernardino Spada 1655–1661 (Bishop of Albano 1646–1652, of Frascati 1652 and of Sabina 1652–1655)
- Antonio Barberini 1661–1671 (Bishop of Frascati 1655–1661)
- Rinaldo d'Este 1671–1672
- Cesare Facchinetti 1672–1679, † 1683 (Bishop of Porto 1679–1680 and of Ostia and Velletri 1680–1683)
- Alderano Cybo 1679–1680, † 1700 (Bishop of Frascati 1680–1683, of Porto 1683–1687 and of Ostia and Velletri 1687–1700)
- Lorenzo Raggi 1680–1687
- Antonio Bichi 1687–1691
- Paluzzo Paluzzi Altieri degli Albertoni 1691–1698 (Bishop of Sabina 1689–1691)
- Luis Manuel Fernando Portocarrero 1698–1709
- Fabrizio Spada 1710–1717
- Francesco del Giudice 1717–1721
- Francesco Barberini 1721–1726, (Bishop of Ostia and Velletri 1726–1738)
- Tommaso Ruffo 1726–1738, † 1753 (Bishop of Porto 1738–1740 and of Ostia and Velletri 1740–1753)
- Giorgio Spinola 1738–1739
- Giovanni Battista Altieri (iuniore) 1739–1740
- Vincenzo Petra 1740–1747
- Antonio Saverio Gentili 1747–1753
- Giuseppe Spinelli 1753–1759, † 1763 (Bishop of Porto 1759–1761 and of Ostia and Velletri 1761–1763)
- Federico Marcello Lante 1759–1763, † 1773 (Bishop of Porto 1763–1773)
- Giovanni Francesco II Stoppani 1763–1774
- Girolamo III Spinola 1775–1784
- Marcantonio Colonna (iuniore) 1784–1793
- Leonardo Antonelli 1794–1800, † 1811 (Bishop of Porto 1800–1807 and of Ostia and Velletri 1807–1811)
- Alessandro Mattei 1800–1809, † 1820 (Bishop of Porto 1809–1814 and of Ostia and Velletri 1814–1820)

=== 1801–2000 ===
- Aurelio Roverella 1809–1812
- Diego Innico Caracciolo di Martina 1814–1820
- Giuseppe Spina 1820–1828
- Francesco Bertazzoli 1828–1830
- Carlo Maria Pedicini 1830–1840, † 1843 (Bishop of Porto 1840–1843)
- Vincenzo Macchi 1840–1844, † 1860 (Bishop of Porto 1844–1847 and of Ostia and Velletri 1847–1860)
- Castruccio Castracane degli Anteliminelli 1844–1852
- Luigi Amato di San Filippo e Sorso 1852–1870, † 1877–1878 (Bishop of Porto 1871–1877, and of Ostia and Velletri 1877–1878)
- Carlo Sacconi 1870–1878, † 1889 (Bishop of Porto 1878–1884 and of Ostia and Velletri 1884–1889)
- Antonino de Luca 1878–1883
- Luigi Oreglia di Santo Stefano 1884–1889, † 1913 (Bishop of Porto 1889–1896 and of Ostia and Velletri 1896–1913)
- Angelo Bianchi 1889–1897
- Camillo Mazzella 1897–1900
- Vincenzo Vannutelli 1900–1930 (Bishop of Ostia 1915–1930)
- Luigi Sincero 1933–1936
- Angelo Dolci 1936–1939
- Carlo Salotti 1939–1947
- Benedetto Aloisi Masella 1948–1970

== Cardinal-Bishops of the Title of Palestrina ==
=== Since 1961 ===
- Carlo Confalonieri 1972–1986 (Bishop of Ostia 1977–1986)
- Bernardin Gantin 1986–2008 (Bishop of Ostia 1993–2002)
- José Saraiva Martins (2009–current)

== Bishops of Palestrina (post 1961) ==
Like the other five suburbicarian dioceses, the Diocese of Palestrina has had, since 1966, a diocesan bishop with ordinary powers, in addition to the titular cardinal bishop. The diocesan bishops have been:

- Pietro Severi (1966–1975)
- Renato Spallanzani (1975–1986)
- Pietro Garlato (1986–1991)
- Vittorio Tomassetti (1992–1997)
- Eduardo Davino (1997–2005)
- Domenico Sigalini (2005–2017)
- Mauro Parmeggiani (2019–current)

== Bibliography ==
- Bräuer, Martin (2014). Handbuch der Kardinäle: 1846-2012 (in German). Berlin: De Gruyter. ISBN 978-3-11-026947-5.
- Brixius, Johannes M. Die Mitglieder des Kardinalskollegiums von 1130-1181, Berlin 1912.
- Eubel, Conradus, ed. (1913). Hierarchia catholica, Tomus 1 (second ed.). Münster: Libreria Regensbergiana. (in Latin)
- Eubel, Conradus, ed. (1914). Hierarchia catholica, Tomus 2 (second ed.). Münster: Libreria Regensbergiana. (in Latin)
- Gulik, Guilelmus (1923). Eubel, Conradus (ed.). Hierarchia catholica, Tomus 3 (second ed.). Münster: Libreria Regensbergiana. p. 80. (in Latin)
- Gams, Pius B. Series episcoporum Ecclesiae catholicae, Leipzig 1931.
- Gauchat, Patritius (Patrice) (1935). Hierarchia catholica IV (1592-1667). Münster: Libraria Regensbergiana. (in Latin)
- Hüls, Rudolf. Kardinäle, Klerus und Kirchen Roms: 1049–1130, Bibliothek des Deutschen Historischen Instituts in Rom 1977.
- Kehr, Paul Fridolin (1907). Italia pontificia (in Latin). Vol. II: Latium. Berlin: Apud Weidmannos. pp. 47–52.
- Klewitz, Hans-Walter. Reformpapsttum und Kardinalkolleg, Darmstadt 1957.
- Lentz, Harris M. (2009). Popes and Cardinals of the 20th Century: A Biographical Dictionary. Jefferson NC USA: McFarland. ISBN 978-1-4766-2155-5.
- Maleczek, Werner. Papst und Kardinalskolleg von 1191 bis 1216, Vienna 1984.
- Ritzler, Remigius; Sefrin, Pirminus (1952). Hierarchia catholica medii et recentis aevi V (1667-1730). Patavii: Messagero di S. Antonio. (in Latin)
- Ritzler, Remigius; Sefrin, Pirminus (1958). Hierarchia catholica medii et recentis aevi VI (1730-1799). Patavii: Messagero di S. Antonio. (in Latin)
