= Vittorio Tomassetti =

Italian bishop

- Bishop of Fano-Fossombrone-Cagli-Pergola
- Church: Catholic Church
- Diocese: Diocese of Fano-Fossombrone-Cagli-Pergola
- In office: 8 September 1998 – 21 July 2007
- Predecessor: Mario Cecchini
- Successor: Armando Trasarti
- Previous posts: Coadjutor Bishop of Fano-Fossombrone-Cagli-Pergola (1997-1998); Bishop of Palestrina (1992-1997)

Orders
- Ordination: 23 August 1953
- Consecration: 28 June 1992 by Bernardin Gantin

Personal details
- Born: 28 June 1930 Staffolo, Province of Ancona, Kingdom of Italy
- Died: 6 January 2008 (aged 77)

Vittorio Tomassetti (28 June 1930 – 6 January 2008) was the Italian Roman Catholic bishop emeritus of the Diocese of Fano-Fossombrone-Cagli-Pergola. He was ordained a priest on 23 August 1953, and was later ordained a bishop on 28 June 1992 as the bishop of Palestrina, Italy.
