= Pataria =

11th-century religious-political movement

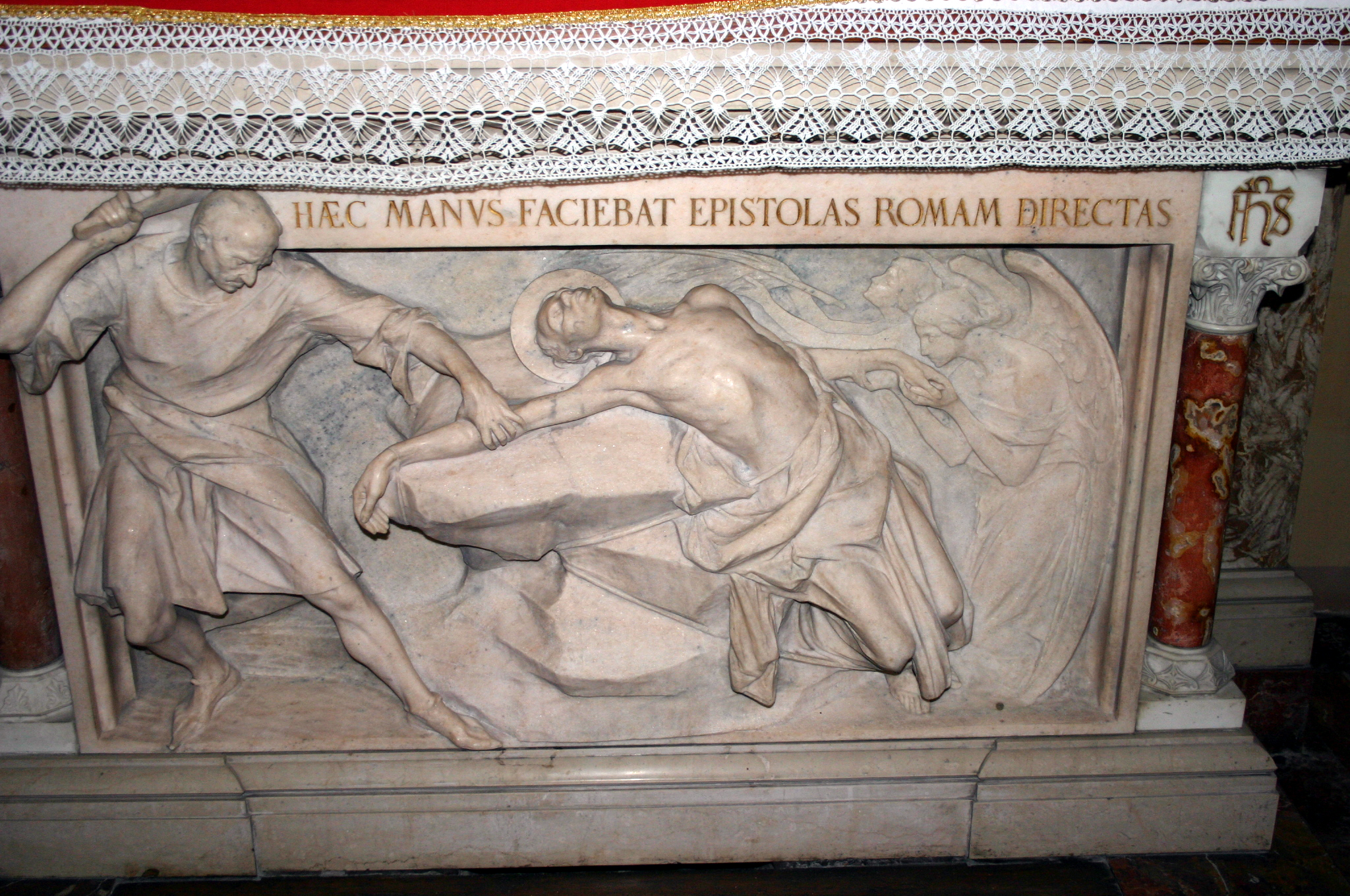
The murder of Arialdo da Carimate, part of the conflict of the pataria

The pataria was an eleventh-century Catholic movement focused on the city of Milan in northern Italy, which aimed to reform the clergy and ecclesiastic government within the city and its ecclesiastical province, in support of papal sanctions against simony and clerical marriage. Those involved in the movement were called patarini (singular patarino), patarines or patarenes, a word perhaps chosen by their opponents, the etymology of which is uncertain. The movement, associated with urban unrest in the city of Milan, is generally considered to have begun in 1057 and ended in 1075. The movement failed to achieve its goal.

The name Patarenes has also been used for the unconnected earlier Bogomils and the later Albigensians or Cathars, who in contrast were anti-papal and non-Catholic. These were declared heretical sects. They are considered by some as a precursor to the Protestant Reformation, however some sources fail to differentiate these different groups.

== History ==
Early in the year 1057, a preacher named Arialdo arrived in the city of Milan and began to preach against the Milanese clerics' custom of marrying. It is possible that he took advantage of the absence at this time of the Archbishop of Milan, Guido da Velate, who was in Germany in August at the Council of Tribur.

The Milanese clergy grew concerned by Arialdo's attempt to whip up the city against them, and sent envoys to Pope Stephen IX in Rome. On hearing this, Arialdo travelled to Rome himself. Pope Stephen IX was sympathetic to Arialdo's position, and sent two envoys to Milan, Hildebrand of Sovana (later Pope Gregory VII) and Anselm of Baggio (later Pope Alexander II). Arialdo also returned to Milan, and now began to criticise the Milanese clerics' practice of simony, resulting in urban unrest. Arialdo's close associate Landulf Cotta was attacked, and later died from his injuries.

In 1059 Arialdo travelled to Rome again to seek advice; Pope Stephen IX again sent envoys to Milan, this time Peter Damian and again Anselm of Baggio, but this did nothing to quell the unrest in the city. In 1063, Landulf Cotta's brother Erlembald went to Rome where he obtained a papal banner from the newly elected Pope Alexander II in support of the Pataria movement. In 1066, Pope Alexander II finally excommunicated Archbishop Guido. Guido used this excommunication, however, to whip up the citizens' anger against the Patarenes at a public meeting, and Arialdo was first chased out of the city of Milan, and then assassinated, in June 1066.

However, when Arialdo's body was found in May 1067, it quickly became the object of a cult, and popular opinion in Milan swung back behind the Pataria. Archbishop Guido was forced out of the city, leaving it under the control of Erlembald, and Alexander II formally proclaimed Arialdo to be a saint in 1068.

Archbishop Guido resigned in 1068, in favour of his associate Gotofredo da Castiglione, who was also supported by Emperor Henry IV. The papacy and the Pataria however supported a different candidate as archbishop, Attone, and Pope Gregory VII excommunicated Gotofredo in 1074.

Rioting in Milan led to the murder of Erlembald in 1075, and after this point, the Pataria movement lost much of its energy. The controversy over the appointment of the archbishop of Milan continued, however, and contributed to the political tensions between Emperor Henry IV and Pope Gregory VII.

== Medieval historiography ==
There are several contemporary and nearly-contemporary sources for the Pataria, each of which offers different and sometimes contradictory perspectives. These include:

- Andrew of Strumi's Life of Saint Ariald
- Bonizo of Sutri's Liber ad amicum
- Arnulf of Milan's Deeds of the Archbishops of Milan
- Landulf Senior's History of Milan

== Modern historiography ==
As Paolo Golinelli has emphasised, modern debates about the Pataria have often centred on whether the Pataria was primarily a religious movement, or whether it was instead the religious expression of social tensions within the city and region of Milan. The Italian historian Gioacchino Volpe, for instance, argued in 1907 that the Pataria was a class conflict between the elites of Milan and the lower-status population. This interpretation was also supported by Ernst Werner in 1956. For Hagen Keller, the Pataria is best understood as part of the history of the emergence of the Italian commune.

More recently, historians such as Herbert Cowdrey have emphasised the movement's essentially religious nature. Many historians have associated the movement with wider reforming trends in the Church. For William North, the Pataria was 'the longest... and most violent of the popular responses to the call for ecclesiastical reform in the eleventh century'. In his article on religious change in the eleventh century, R.I. Moore discussed the Pataria extensively as a major part of the 'appearance of the crowd on the stage of public events', which he sees as being brought into being by religious reform (itself, however, a response to social change).

In a 2018 article, Piroska Nagy suggested a new path of interpretation by analysing the collective emotions of the movement.

== Name ==
The name Pataria likely comes from the members of the movement assembling in Pataria or ragmen's quarter of the city (pates is a Milanese dialectal word for “rag”), and signified a popular faction "applied in derision by the aristocracy".

However, the name was appropriated by Cathars who claimed it means "to suffer", as to say they suffered for their faith.
