= Atto (archbishop of Milan) =

Italian archbishop

Styles of Attone
- Reference style: His Eminence
- Spoken style: Your Eminence
- Informal style: Cardinal
- See: San Marco

Atto (Italian: Attone) was a cardinal of the Catholic Church who lived in the 11th century.

Born in Rome as the son of a noble family. As a young man in 1062 he was elected by the chapter of the Milan cathedral Archbishop of Milan, Attone was elected archbishop in front of a papal legate but the decision of the chapter of the cathedral didn't receive the placet of emperor Henry IV so he coundn't be enthroned. Attone was so forced to leave Milan and he reached Rome where he lived in the Church of San Marco is title as Cardinal. During his stay in Rome, Attone wrote a book about canon law. In that book he supported the supremacy of the bishop of Rome over the civil authorities following the teaching of pope Gregory VII. The date of his death is unclear. For some authors the date of his death is around 1080, other authors identify him as a Cardinal Bishop of Palestrina, who dies after being excommunicated by pope Gregory VII after 1085.
