= H. E. J. Cowdrey =

English historian and priest

The Reverend H. E. J. Cowdrey FBA
- Born: Herbert Edward John Cowdrey; 29 November 1926; Basingstoke, England
- Died: 4 December 2009 (aged 83)
- Other name: John Cowdrey
- Spouse: Judith Watson Davis (m. 1959; died 2004)

Ecclesiastical career
- Religion: Christianity (Anglican)
- Church: Church of England
- Ordained: 1953

Academic background
- Education: Trinity College, Oxford
- Influences: Austin Farrer

Academic work
- Discipline: History
- Sub-discipline: Ecclesiastical history; medieval history
- Institutions: St Edmund Hall, Oxford
- Notable students: Graham Loud
- Main interests: Crusades; Gregorian reforms
- Notable works: Pope Gregory VII, 1073–1085 (1998)

Herbert Edward John Cowdrey (1926–2009), known as H. E. J. Cowdrey or John Cowdrey, was an English historian of the Middle Ages and an Anglican priest. He was elected priest of St Edmund Hall, University of Oxford, in 1956. He resigned the chaplaincy in 1976, but continued to teach medieval history there until 1994, when he retired and was elected emeritus fellow. He was also a Fellow of the British Academy. A leading expert on the Gregorian reforms, his most important work is the monograph Pope Gregory VII, 1073–1085, considered a masterpiece "unlikely to be surpassed".

== Life and career ==
Born in Basingstoke on 29 November 1926, Cowdrey attended Queen Mary's School for Boys there from 1937 until 1943, when he won a scholarship to Trinity College, Oxford. At that time, he considered himself an atheist. Drafted into the service because of World War II, he chose to join the Royal Navy in 1944. He served aboard HMS Mauritius in the eastern Mediterranean from 1945 to 1947. He arrived before the war was over, but saw no action. On 22 October 1946, he was in one of the magazines during the second Corfu Channel incident, when Mauritius and her flotilla passed through an unexpected minefield off Albania. After his stint in the navy, Cowdrey visited Palestine during the last year of the British mandate.

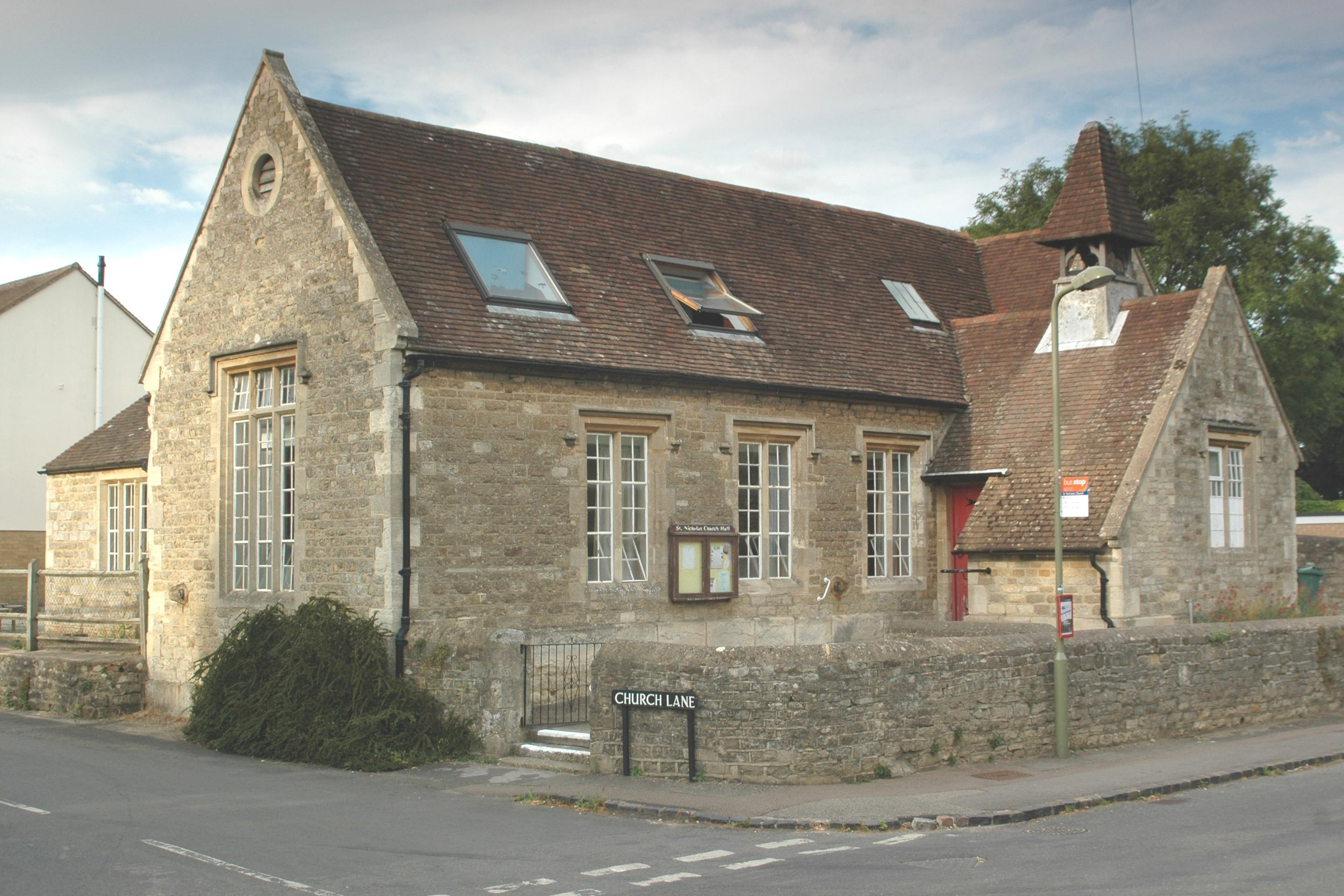
For many years, Cowdrey was deputy to the vicar of St Nicholas parish church in Marston. He frequently preached on Sunday mornings.

After returning to Oxford in 1947, Cowdrey studied modern (post-1760) history and theology (under Austin Farrer). He first began research into the medieval papacy and Pope Gregory VII during his theological studies. He also learned biblical Hebrew and ancient Greek, in addition to the modern languages he already knew (English, French, German and Italian). In 1953, he took holy orders at St Stephen's House, Oxford, a high church seminary, where he also taught Old Testament and theology until 1956, when he took up the chaplaincy at St Edmund Hall. In 1957, St Edmund Hall received new statutes, becoming a full college, and Cowdrey was thus one of the founding fellows.

In 1963, Cowdrey studied the dissemination and reception of Augustine of Hippo's theology. In 1966–1968, he published three articles on Milan in order to illuminate the background to the Patarene movement and the Gregorian reform. In 1970, he published his first book—The Cluniacs and the Gregorian Reform—and an article on the Peace and Truce of God, which remains "the most reliable and most persuasive discussion of the Peace and Truce in English". He argued that there was a connection between the earlier Peace and Truce movements and the later Crusades. He also published a paper that year arguing that from the start the purpose of the First Crusade was the liberation of Jerusalem. This was a refutation of the thesis of Carl Erdmann that the goal of the crusade at the start was the defence of the Byzantine Empire and the eastern church.

The latter paper made Cowdrey an important crusades scholar. In the summer of 1977, he lectured in Israeli universities and visited crusader sites. Much of his later work on the Crusades was collected in The Crusades and Latin Monasticism in the Eleventh and Twelfth Centuries (1999). In 1972, he published his second book, The Epistolae Vagantes of Pope Gregory VII, an edited and translated collection of the unregistered letters of Gregory VII that Erdmann had been intending to do before his death. In 2002, he published The Register of Pope Gregory VII, 1073–1085, an English translation of Gregory's registered letters, the first since Ephraim Emerton's appeared in 1932.

In 1983, The Age of Abbot Desiderius: Montecassino, the Papacy, and the Normans in the Eleventh and Early Twelfth Centuries, a preliminary to Cowdrey's projected book on Gregory VII, appeared. The projected book, Pope Gregory VII, 1073–1085, appeared in 1998 and was considered an instant masterpiece. His last book, Lanfranc: Scholar, Monk, and Archbishop, was published in 2003. It is a study of Lanfranc of Canterbury, an Italian monk from Normandy, that seeks to show that he understood England and the needs of the English church.

Cowdrey married Judith Watson Davis, a musician, in 1959. They had two daughters and a son. Judith died in 2004. Late in life, Cowdrey was diagnosed with Parkinson's disease. He died on 4 December 2009.
