= Guido da Velate =

Archbishop of Milan from 1045 until 1071

Guido da Velate (also Guy or Wido) (died 1071) was the Archbishop of Milan from 1045 until his death, though he had simoniacally abdicated in 1067. He had been chosen as successor to Aribert by the people in opposition to the choice of the nobility and confirmed as archbishop by the Emperor Henry III.

Guido was the archbishop of Milan at a time when the Pataria was gaining force in the city. Riot and unrest was a daily affair and Guido is reputed to have had a hand in much of it. He opposed the papal reforms and the Patarines who sought to outlaw clerical marriage and concubinage; he was a simoniac himself. Because he also refused to abide by the compromise of 1044, which would have limited his powers, he found himself at odds with the communards and the lesser nobility as well as the reform school.

After the death of Henry III in 1056, Hildebrand, Anselm of Baggio, and Peter Damian were sent to settle matters in Milan, but to little avail. The peace they brokered was broken incessantly until 1067, when Guido gave up his see and recommended the subdeacon Gotofredo da Castiglione to the Emperor Henry IV (for a price). Guido was convinced by Anselm of Baggio, now pope, to repent of his abdication and return to his post. He died a few years later and Henry tried again (uncanonically) to appoint Gotofredo.

== Sources ==
- Duff, Nora (1909). Matilda of Tuscany: La Gran Donna d'Italia. London: Methuen & Co.
- Jordan, William Chester (2003). Europe in the High Middle Ages. London: Viking.
