= Antipope Clement III =

Catholic antipope from 1080 to 1100

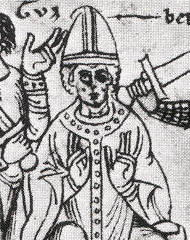
- Antipope Clement III, image from Codex Jenesis Boseq.6 (1157)
- Papacy began: 25 June 1080
- Papacy ended: 8 September 1100
- Predecessor: Roman claimant: Gregory VII; Antipapal claimant: Honorius II
- Successor: Roman claimant: Paschal II; Antipapal claimant: Theodoric
- Opposed to: Gregory VII; Victor III; Urban II; Paschal II
- Other post: Archbishop of Ravenna

Personal details
- Born: Guibert (or Wibert) c. 1029 Ravenna
- Died: 8 September 1100 (aged 70–71) Civita Castellana

Guibert or Wibert of Ravenna (c. 1029 – 8 September 1100) was an Italian prelate, archbishop of Ravenna, who was elected pope in 1080 in opposition to Pope Gregory VII and took the name Clement III. Gregory was the leader of the movement in the church which opposed the traditional claim of European monarchs to control ecclesiastical appointments, and this was opposed by supporters of monarchical rights led by the Holy Roman Emperor. This led to the conflict known as the Investiture Controversy. Gregory was felt by many to have gone too far when he excommunicated the Holy Roman Emperor Henry IV and supported a rival claimant as emperor, and in 1080 the pro-imperial Synod of Brixen pronounced that Gregory was deposed and replaced as pope by Guibert.

Consecrated as Pope Clement III in Rome in March 1084, he commanded a significant following in Rome and elsewhere, especially during the first half of his pontificate, and reigned in opposition to four successive popes in the anti-imperial line: Gregory VII, Victor III, Urban II, and Paschal II. After his death and burial at Civita Castellana in 1100 he was celebrated locally as a miracle-working saint, but Paschal II and the anti-imperial party soon subjected him to damnatio memoriae, which included the exhuming and dumping of his remains in the Tiber. He is considered an anti-pope by the Roman Catholic Church.

== Early life ==
He was born into the noble family of the Correggio, probably between 1020 and 1030. He had family connections to the margraves of Canossa. A cleric, he was appointed to the Imperial chancellorship for Italy by Empress Agnes in 1058, which position he held until 1063. In 1058 he participated in the election of Pope Nicholas II but on the death of Nicholas in 1061, Guibert sided with the imperial party to elect Cadalo of Parma as Antipope Honorius II against Pope Alexander II. Owing to the active support of Duke Godfrey of Lorraine, of Archbishop Anno II of Cologne, and especially of Peter Damian, Alexander was soon recognized even in Germany and by Empress Agnes which may have been the reason of Guibert's dismissal in 1063 from the chancellorship.

Guibert apparently continued to cultivate his contacts within the German court, for in 1072, Emperor Henry IV named him archbishop of the vacant see of Ravenna. And, although Pope Alexander II was reluctant to confirm this appointment, he was persuaded by Hildebrand to do so, perhaps as a compromise for peace. Guibert then took an oath of allegiance to the pope and his successors and was installed at Ravenna in 1073.

== Quarrels with Pope Gregory ==
Shortly after Pope Alexander II died Hildebrand was proclaimed the next pope, being installed as Pope Gregory VII on 29 April 1073. Guibert attended the first Lenten Synods of Pope Gregory in March 1074 in Rome at which important laws were passed against simony and the incontinence of the clergy, and lay investiture. The Imperial appointed German bishops were the most important officials of the empire, and a means to balance the ambitions of the territorial princes.

Guibert soon emerged as one of the most visible leaders of opposition to the Gregorian reforms. Having attended Gregory's first Lenten Synods, Guibert refused to attend the next, the Lenten Synod of 1075, although he was bound by oath to obey the summons to attend. Guibert was unsympathetic to Gregory's opposition to the Imperial Court, which Guibert had served as Chancellor of Italy. By his absence Guibert demonstrated his opposition to Gregory VII, who now suspended him for his refusal to attend the synod.

It was in this same year that Emperor Henry IV began his open conflict with Gregory. At the synod of Worms in January 1076, a resolution was adopted deposing Gregory, and in this decision the pro-imperial bishops of Transalpine Italy joined. Among these must have been Guibert, for he shared in the sentence of excommunication and interdiction which Gregory VII pronounced against the Transalpine bishops at the Lenten Synod of 1076.

Shortly after, in April 1076, bishops and abbots of the imperial Transalpine party convened at Pavia under the presidency of Guibert and proclaimed the excommunication of Gregory VII; a messenger, bearing a caustic personal letter from Henry, was dispatched with the Pavian reply to the pope. In response to the action of Henry's 1076 Synod of Worms, Gregory excommunicated Henry IV. Gregory excommunicated Guibert by name at the Lenten Synod of February 1078 and with him his main accomplice Archbishop Tebaldo of Milan.

== Reign as Imperial Opposition Pope ==
During the next four years, the Emperor and the Pope reconciled but then quarreled again, and, facing a rebellion among the German nobles, Emperor Henry threatened to depose Pope Gregory. Carrying out his threats, Henry summoned his German and Transpadine partisans to a Synod at Brixen in June 1080, which drew up a new decree purporting to depose Pope Gregory VII, and which Henry himself also signed, and then proceeded to elect Guibert, the excommunicated Archbishop of Ravenna, as pope in opposition to Pope Gregory, whom the Synod considered deposed; Guibert took the name Clement III. Henry recognized Guibert as pope, swearing that he would lead him to Rome, and there receive from his hands the imperial crown.

With Rudolph of Swabia, leader of the rebellious nobles, having fallen mortally wounded at the Battle of Mersburg in 1080, Henry could concentrate all his forces against Gregory. In 1081, he marched on Rome, but failed to force his way into the city, which he finally accomplished only in 1084.

Henry entered Rome on 21 March 1084, and succeeded in gaining possession of the greater part of the city. Gregory took refuge in Castel Sant'Angelo. On 24 March, Guibert was enthroned as pope in the church of St. John Lateran as Clement III, and on 31 March he crowned Henry IV as Emperor at St. Peter's.

However, with news of the approach of the Norman army of Gregory's ally, Robert Guiscard, Duke of Apulia and Calabria, Henry and Guibert abandoned Rome, and, in revenge for Matilda of Tuscany's support of Gregory, Henry ravaged her possessions in Tuscany. Guibert withdrew to Ravenna, where he still held the title of archbishop. His influence, after Henry IV's withdrawal from Italy, was largely concentrated in Ravenna and a few other districts of Northern Italy, but he also retained some support in Rome.

Gregory was liberated, but the people were incensed by the excesses of his Norman allies, and he was compelled to leave Rome. He withdrew to Monte Cassino, and later to the castle of Salerno by the sea, in 1084, where he died in the following year, 25 May 1085.

The German episcopate stood divided. While bishops of Gregory VII's party held a Synod in Quedlinburg, at which they denounced and condemned Guibert, partisans of Henry held a rival Synod at Mainz in 1085, where they approved the deposition of Gregory and the elevation of Guibert. This conflict continued even after the death of Gregory, during the entire reigns of whose successors, Pope Victor III, Pope Urban II, and Pope Paschal II, Guibert continued to be regarded as pope by Henry and his party.

Victor III, who was elected after a prolonged vacancy caused by the critical position of the Church in Rome, was compelled, eight days after his coronation in St. Peter's on 3 May 1087, to flee Rome before the partisans of Guibert. The latter were in turn assailed by the troops of Countess Matilda, and entrenched themselves in the Pantheon. However, at the threats of the emperor, Victor was obliged to flee once more.

The succeeding pope, Urban II (1088–1099), spent most of the first half of his pontificate in exile, in southern Italy and in France. Late in 1093 he managed to obtain a foothold in Rome, with help from the Frangipane family, and gradually expanded his power there.

By 1089, Clement III was back in Rome, where in June, he held a Synod declaring invalid the decree of excommunication launched against Henry, and various charges were made against the supporters of Urban II, the pope of the anti-imperial party. Still, by the mid-nineties his power and authority began to wane. The greater part of the city of Rome was captured by an army under Count Hugh of Vermandois, brother of the King of France. The party of Guibert retained only the Castle of Sant' Angelo, and even this in 1098 fell into the hands of Vermandois.

In 1099, he repaired to Albano after the accession of Paschal II (1099–1118), hoping again to become master of Rome, but Norman troops compelled him to withdraw. He reached Civita Castellana, where he died 8 September 1100. His followers elected a successor to Guibert, the Antipope Theodoric, who, however, was not a serious threat to the popes of the anti-imperial line, now considered canonical.

== See also ==
- Concordat of Worms
- First Council of the Lateran
- Papal selection before 1059

== Sources ==
- Coulombe, C.A. (2003). Vicars of Christ: A History of the Popes. Kensington Publishing Corporation. ISBN 978-0-8065-2370-5.
