= Gotofredo da Castiglione =

Italian bishop by lay investiture,1070-1075

Gotofredo da Castiglione (sometimes given as Gotofredo II to distinguish him from Gotofredo I, Archbishop of Milan) was an Italian anti-bishop from 1070 to 1075, appointed by Henry IV, Holy Roman Emperor to the office of Bishop of Milan. This began the Investiture Controversy, whereby Pope Gregory VII excommunicated Gotofredo over the issue of lay investiture.

Gotofredo was eventually recanted as bishop after the Walk to Canossa in 1077.
