= Pope Gregory VII =

Head of the Catholic Church from 1073 to 1085

Pope Saint Gregory VII
- Bishop of Rome
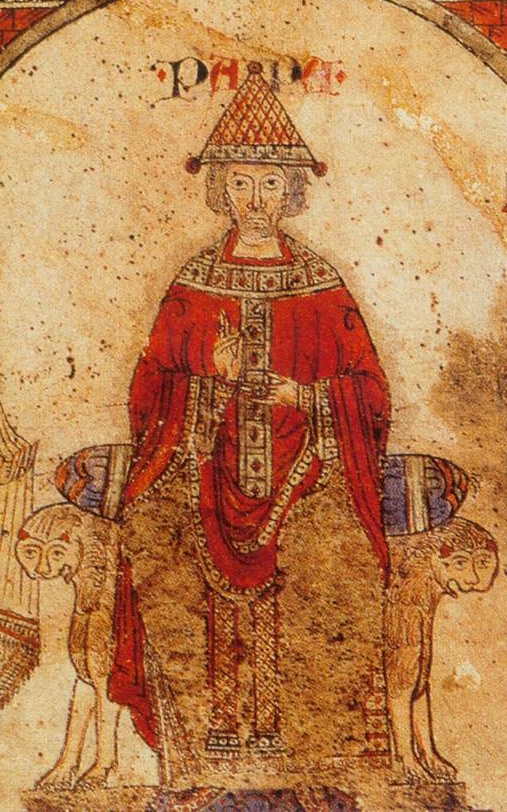
- Depiction of Gregory VII from an exultet roll, c. 1087
- Church: Catholic Church
- Papacy began: 22 April 1073
- Papacy ended: 25 May 1085
- Predecessor: Alexander II
- Successor: Victor III
- Previous post: Archdeacon of the Roman church

Orders
- Ordination: 22 May 1073
- Consecration: 30 June 1073
- Created cardinal: 6 March 1058 by Pope Stephen IX

Personal details
- Born: Ildebrando di Soana c. 1015 Sovana, March of Tuscany, Holy Roman Empire
- Died: 25 May 1085 (aged 69–70) Salerno, Duchy of Apulia

Sainthood
- Feast day: 25 May
- Venerated in: Catholic Church
- Beatified: 25 May 1584; Rome, Papal States by Pope Gregory XIII
- Canonized: 24 May 1728; Rome, Papal States by Pope Benedict XIII
- Attributes: Papal vestments; Papal tiara
- Patronage: Diocese of Sovana

Pope Gregory VII (Latin: Gregorius VII; c. 1015 – 25 May 1085), born Hildebrand of Sovana (Italian: Ildebrando di Soana), was head of the Catholic Church and ruler of the Papal States from 22 April 1073 to his death in 1085. He is venerated as a saint in the Catholic Church.

One of the great reforming popes, he initiated the Gregorian Reform, and is perhaps best known for the part he played in the Investiture Controversy, his dispute with Emperor Henry IV to establish the primacy of papal authority and the new canon law governing the election of the pope by the College of Cardinals. He was also at the forefront of developments in the relationship between the Holy Roman Emperor and the papacy in the years preceding his election as pope. He was the first pope to enforce an obligatory policy of unmarried clergy, which had until then commonly married but had been ineffectively mandated to continence, and also attacked the practice of simony.

During the power struggles between the papacy and the Empire, Gregory excommunicated Henry IV three times, and Henry appointed Antipope Clement III to oppose him. Although Gregory was hailed as one of the greatest of the Roman pontiffs after his reforms proved successful, during his own reign, he was denounced by some for his autocratic exercise of papal power.

In later times, Gregory VII became an exemplar of papal supremacy to both supporters and opponents of the papacy. Beno of Santi Martino e Silvestro, who opposed Gregory VII in the Investiture Controversy, accused him of necromancy, cruelty, tyranny, and blasphemy. This was eagerly repeated by later opponents of the Catholic Church, such as the English Protestant John Foxe. In contrast, the modern historian and Anglican priest H. E. J. Cowdrey writes, "[Gregory VII] was surprisingly flexible, feeling his way and therefore perplexing both rigorous collaborators ... and cautious and steady-minded ones ... His zeal, moral force, and religious conviction, however, ensured that he should retain to a remarkable degree the loyalty and service of a wide variety of men and women."

== Early life ==
Gregory was born Hildebrand (Italian: Ildebrando) in the town of Sovana, in the County of Grosseto, now southern Tuscany, the son of a blacksmith. As a youth, he was sent to study in Rome at the monastery of St. Mary on the Aventine, where his uncle was reportedly abbot of a monastery on the Aventine Hill. Among his masters were the erudite Lawrence, archbishop of Amalfi, and Johannes Gratianus, the future Pope Gregory VI. When the latter was deposed at the Council of Sutri in December 1046, with approval of the Holy Roman Emperor Henry III and exiled to Germany, Hildebrand followed him to Cologne. According to some chroniclers, Hildebrand moved to Cluny after Gregory VI died in 1048; though his declaration to have become a monk at Cluny is disputed.

He then accompanied Cluny's Abbot Bruno of Toul to Rome, where Bruno was elected pope, taking the name Leo IX, and appointed Hildebrand as deacon and papal administrator. In 1054, Leo sent Hildebrand as his legate to Tours in France in the wake of the controversy created by Berengar of Tours. At Leo's death, the new pope, Victor II, confirmed him as legate, while Victor's successor Stephen IX sent him and Anselm of Lucca to Germany to obtain recognition from Empress Agnes. Hildebrand succeeded in his plea to Agnes, but Stephen died before being able to return to Rome, and Hildebrand was soon embroiled the crisis caused by the Roman aristocracy's election of an antipope, Benedict X. With Agnes's continued support, Benedict was formally replaced by Nicholas II, and with the help of 300 Norman knights sent by Richard of Aversa, Hildebrand personally led the conquest of the castle of Galeria Antica where Benedict had taken refuge. Between 1058 and 1059, he was made archdeacon of the Roman church, becoming the most important figure in the papal administration.

He was again the most powerful figure behind the election of Anselm of Lucca the Elder as Pope Alexander II in the papal election of October 1061. The new pope put forward the reform program devised by Hildebrand and his followers. In his years as papal advisor, Hildebrand had an important role in the reconciliation with the Norman kingdom of southern Italy, in the anti-German alliance with the Pataria movement in northern Italy, and above all, in the new ecclesiastic law giving the cardinals exclusive rights to elect a new pope.

== Election to the papacy ==
Pope Gregory VII was one of the few popes elected by acclamation. As funeral obsequies were being performed for Alexander II on 21 April 1073 in the Lateran Basilica, there arose an outcry from the clergy and people: "Let Hildebrand be pope!", "Blessed Peter has chosen Hildebrand the Archdeacon!" Hildebrand immediately fled and hid himself to make it clear that he refused this uncanonical election. He was finally found at the Church of San Pietro in Vincoli, to which a famous monastery was attached, and elected pope by the assembled cardinals, with the due consent of the Roman clergy, amid the repeated acclamations of the people.

It was debated, at the time and since, whether this extraordinary outburst in favour of Hildebrand by clergy and people was wholly spontaneous or premeditated. According to Benizo, Bishop of Sutri, a supporter of Hildebrand, the outcry was begun by Cardinal Ugo Candidus, Cardinal Priest of S. Clemente, who rushed into a pulpit and began to declaim to the people. Certainly, the mode of his election was highly criticized by his opponents. Many of the accusations against his election may have reflected personal dislike, as they were not raised until several years later. But it is clear from Gregory's own account of the circumstances in his Epistles 1 and 2 that it was conducted contrary to the Constitution of the Pope of 607, which forbade a papal election until the third day after a pope's burial. Cardinal Ugo's intervention was contrary to the Constitution of Nicholas II, which allowed only Cardinal Bishops to nominate candidates; and finally, it ignored the Constitution's requirement that the Holy Roman Emperor be consulted. However, Gregory was then confirmed by a second election at S. Pietro in Vincoli.

Gregory VII's earliest pontifical letters clearly acknowledged these events, and thus helped defuse doubts about his election and popularity. On 22 May 1073, the Feast of Pentecost, he received ordination as a priest, and he was consecrated a bishop and enthroned as pope on 29 June, the Feast of St. Peter's Chair.

In the decree of election, his electors proclaimed Gregory VII:

"a devout man, a man mighty in human and divine knowledge, a distinguished lover of equity and justice, a man firm in adversity and temperate in prosperity, a man, according to the saying of the Apostle, of good behavior, blameless, modest, sober, chaste, given to hospitality, and one that ruleth well his own house; a man from his childhood generously brought up in the bosom of this Mother Church, and for the merit of his life already raised to the archidiaconal dignity. [...] We choose then our Archdeacon Hildebrand to be pope and successor to the Apostle, and to bear henceforward and forever the name of Gregory" (22 April 1073).

Gregory VII's first attempts in foreign policy were towards a reconciliation with the Normans of Robert Guiscard; in the end, the two parties did not meet. After a failed call for a crusade to the princes of northern Europe, and after obtaining the support of other Norman princes such as Landulf VI of Benevento and Richard I of Capua, Gregory VII was able to excommunicate Robert in 1074.

In the same year, Gregory VII summoned a council in the Lateran palace, which condemned simony and confirmed celibacy for the Church's clergy. These decrees were further stressed, under threat of excommunication, the next year (24–28 February). In particular, Gregory decreed that only the Pope could appoint or depose bishops or move them from see to see, an act which was later to cause the Investiture Controversy.

== Start of conflict with the Emperor ==
Gregory VII's main political project was his relationship with the Holy Roman Empire. After the death of Holy Roman Emperor Henry III, his untried son Henry IV had to contend with turbulent internal opposition to the German monarchy, presenting an opportunity for Gregory to strengthen the Church.

In the two years following Gregory's election, the Saxon rebellion occupied Henry's attention and forced him to appease the pope at any cost. In May 1074, Henry did penance at Nuremberg—in the presence of the papal legates—to atone for his continued friendship with his councillors, whom Gregory had banned; he took an oath of obedience, and promised the pope his support in reforming the Church. However, as soon as Henry defeated the Saxons at the First Battle of Langensalza on 9 June 1075 (Battle of Homburg or Hohenburg), the young emperor tried to reassert his sovereign rights in northern Italy. Henry sent Count Eberhard to Lombardy to combat the Patarenes; nominated the cleric Tedald to the archbishopric of Milan, settling a prolonged and contentious question; and made overtures to the Norman duke Robert Guiscard.

Gregory VII replied with a harsh letter of 8 December 1075, accusing Henry of breaching his word and of continuing to support excommunicated councillors. The pope also sent a verbal message threatening to excommunicate and even depose the emperor. At the same time, Gregory was menaced by Cencio I Frangipane, who on Christmas night surprised him in church and kidnapped him, though he was released the following day.

=== Pope and emperor depose each other ===
The high-handed demands and threats of the pope infuriated Henry and his court, and their answer was the hastily convened national synod of Worms on 24 January 1076. Gregory had many enemies among the German prelates, and the Roman cardinal Hugo Candidus, once on intimate terms with Gregory but now his opponent, hurried to Germany for the occasion. Candidus declaimed a list of accusations against the pope before the assembly, which resolved that Gregory had forfeited the papacy. In a document replete with accusations, the bishops renounced their allegiance to Gregory. In another, Henry pronounced him deposed and required the Romans to choose a new pope.

The council sent two bishops to Italy; who then procured a similar act of deposition from the Lombard bishops at the synod of Piacenza. Roland of Parma presented these decisions to the pope before the synod that had just assembled in the Lateran Basilica. Rejecting the threat, there soon arose such a storm of indignation that only the calming words of Gregory saved the envoy's life.

On the following day, 22 February 1076, Gregory solemnly pronounced a sentence of excommunication against Henry IV, divested him of his royal dignity, and absolved his subjects of their sworn allegiance. The effectiveness of this sentence depended entirely on Henry's subjects, above all on the German princes. Contemporary evidence suggests that Henry's excommunication made a profound impression in both Germany and Italy.

Thirty years earlier, Henry III had deposed three unworthy claimants to the papacy, an act acknowledged by the Church and public opinion. When Henry IV again attempted this procedure, he lacked support. In Germany, there was a widespread and rapid sentiment in favor of Gregory, strengthening the princes against their feudal lord, Henry. At Whitsun, the emperor summoned a council of nobles to oppose the pope; only a few responded. Meanwhile, the Saxons seized the opportunity for a new rebellion, and the anti-royalist party grew in strength from month to month.

=== Walk to Canossa ===
Henry now faced ruin. As a result of the agitation, which was zealously fostered by the papal legate Bishop Altmann of Passau, the princes met in October at Trebur to elect a new German emperor. Henry, who was stationed at Oppenheim on the left bank of the Rhine, was only saved from the loss of his throne by the failure of the assembled princes to agree on his successor. Nevertheless, they declared that Henry must make reparation and obeisance to Gregory. If he were still under the ban on the anniversary of his excommunication, his throne should be considered vacant. At the same time, they invited Gregory to Augsburg to decide the conflict.

Unable to oppose his princes and the pope together, Henry saw that he must secure absolution from Gregory. Initially, he attempted to pursue this through an embassy, but when Gregory rejected his overtures, he traveled to Italy in person. The pope had already left Rome and had informed the German princes that he would expect their escort on 8 January 1077 to Mantua. This escort had not appeared when he received the news of Henry's arrival at Canossa, where Gregory had taken refuge under the protection of his close ally, Matilda of Tuscany. Henry travelled through Burgundy, ordering his troops to maintain civility, and was greeted with enthusiasm by the Lombards. In an astonishing turn, the emperor mortified his pride and knelt barefoot in the snow to beg the pope's forgiveness. This penance immediately reversed the moral situation, forcing Gregory to grant Henry absolution. The Walk to Canossa soon became legendary.

The reconciliation was only effected after prolonged negotiations and definite pledges on the part of Henry, and it was with reluctance that Gregory VII at length gave way, considering the political implications. If the pope granted absolution, the diet of princes in Augsburg, which had called on him as arbitrator, would be rendered impotent. It was impossible, however, to deny the penitent re-entrance into the Church, and Gregory VII's Christian duty overrode his political interests.

The removal of the ban did not imply a genuine settlement, as there was no mention of the main question between pope and emperor: that of investiture. A new conflict was inevitable.

=== Later excommunications of Henry IV ===
The rebellion of the German nobles did not end with the emperor's absolution from excommunication. By contrast, at Forchheim in March 1077, they elected a rival ruler, Duke Rudolf of Swabia, with the papal legates declaring their neutrality. Pope Gregory sought to maintain this neutrality in the following years, balancing the two parties of roughly equal strength, each seeking to gain the upper hand by securing the pope's support. His noncommittal stance exasperated both parties, but after Rudolf's victory at the Battle of Flarchheim on 27 January 1080, Gregory abandoned his policy of waiting and again pronounced the excommunication and deposition of Henry on 7 March 1080. However, the pope, under pressure from the Saxons, was misinformed as to the significance of this battle.

The papal censure now received a very different reception from that four years earlier. It was widely regarded as unjustly pronounced on frivolous grounds, and its authority was called into question. The emperor, now more experienced, vigorously denounced the ban as illegal. He summoned a council at Brixen, and on 25 June 1080, thirty bishops present pronounced Gregory deposed, electing archbishop Guibert (Wibert) of Ravenna as his successor. Gregory countered on 15 October, ordering the clergy and laity to elect a new archbishop in place of the "mad" and "tyrannical" schismatic Wibert. In 1081, Henry opened the conflict against Gregory in Italy. The emperor was now in the stronger position, as thirteen cardinals had deserted the pope, and the rival emperor Rudolf of Swabia died on 16 October. A new imperial claimant, Hermann of Luxembourg, was put forward in August 1081, but he was unable to rally the papal party in Germany, and the power of Henry IV rose to its peak.

The pope's chief military supporter, Matilda of Tuscany, blocked Henry's armies from the western passages over the Apennines, so he had to approach Rome from Ravenna. Rome surrendered to the German king in 1084; Gregory thereupon retired into the exile of the Castel Sant'Angelo. Gregory refused to entertain Henry's overtures. However, the latter promised to hand over the antipope Guibert as a prisoner if the sovereign pontiff would consent to crown Henry emperor. Gregory, however, insisted that Henry appear before a council and do penance. The emperor, while pretending to submit to these terms, sought to prevent the council's meeting. A small number of bishops assembled nonetheless, and Gregory again excommunicated Henry.

Henry, upon receipt of this news, again entered Rome on 21 March to see that his supporter, Archbishop Guibert of Ravenna, was enthroned as Pope Clement III on 24 March 1084, who in turn crowned Henry as emperor. In the meantime, Gregory had allied with Robert Guiscard, who marched on the city and compelled Henry to flee towards Civita Castellana.

=== Exile from Rome ===
The pope was liberated, but after the Roman people became incensed by the excesses of his Norman allies, he again withdrew to Monte Cassino, and later to the castle of Salerno by the sea, where he died on 25 May 1085, probably as a prisoner of the Normans. Three days before his death, he withdrew all the censures of excommunication that he had pronounced, except those against the two chief offenders—Henry and Guibert.

== Papal policy to the rest of Europe ==
=== England ===
A map of Gregory VII's papal correspondence

In 1076, Gregory appointed Dol Euen, a monk of Saint-Melaine of Rennes, as bishop of Dol, rejecting both the incumbent, Iuthael, who had the support of William the Conqueror, who had recently been conducting military operations in north-eastern Brittany, and Gilduin, the candidate of the nobles in Dol opposing William. Gregory rejected Iuthael because he was notorious for simony, and Guilden was too young. Gregory also bestowed on Dol Euen the pallium of a metropolitan archbishop, on the condition that he would submit to the judgment of the Holy See when the long-standing case of the right of Dol to be a metropolitan and use the pallium was finally decided.

King William felt himself so safe that he interfered autocratically with the management of the church, forbade the bishops to visit Rome, made appointments to bishoprics and abbeys, and showed little anxiety when the pope lectured him on the different principles which he had as to the relationship of spiritual and temporal powers, or when he prohibited him from commerce or commanded him to acknowledge himself a vassal of the apostolic chair. William was particularly annoyed at Gregory's insistence on dividing ecclesiastical England into two provinces, in opposition to William's need to emphasize the unity of his newly acquired kingdom. Gregory's increasing insistence on the church's independence from secular authority in matters of clerical appointments became an increasingly contentious issue. He sought as well to compel the episcopacy to look to Rome for validation and direction, demanding the regular attendance of prelates in Rome. Gregory had no power to compel the English king to an alteration in his ecclesiastical policy, so he was compelled to ignore what he could not approve, and even considered it advisable to assure King William of his particular affection. On the whole, William's policy was of great benefit to the Church.

=== Normans in the Kingdom of Sicily ===
The relationship of Gregory VII to other European states was strongly influenced by his German policy, since the Holy Roman Empire, by absorbing most of his energies, often forced him to show other rulers the very moderation he withheld from the German king. The Normans' attitude brought him a rude awakening. The great concessions made to them under Nicholas II were not only powerless to stem their advance into central Italy. Still, they failed to secure even the expected protection for the papacy. When Gregory VII was hard-pressed by Henry IV, Robert Guiscard left him to his fate and intervened only when German arms threatened him himself. Then, upon the capture of Rome, he abandoned the city to his troops, and the popular indignation evoked by his act led to Gregory's exile.

=== Claims of Papal sovereignty ===
In several countries, Gregory VII sought to establish a claim of papal sovereignty and secure recognition of its self-asserted rights of possession. On the grounds of "immemorial usage", Corsica and Sardinia were assumed to belong to the Roman Church. Spain, Hungary and Croatia were also claimed as her property, and an attempt was made to induce the king of Denmark to hold his realm as a fief from the pope.

In his treatment of ecclesiastical policy and ecclesiastical reform, Gregory did not stand alone, but found powerful support: in England Archbishop Lanfranc of Canterbury stood closest to him; in France his champion was Bishop Hugh de Dié, who afterwards became Archbishop of Lyon.

=== France ===
Philip I of France, by his practice of simony and the violence of his proceedings against the Church, provoked a threat of summary measures. Excommunication, deposition, and the interdict appeared to be imminent in 1074. Gregory, however, refrained from translating his threats into actions, although the attitude of the king showed no change, for he wished to avoid a dispersion of his strength in the conflict soon to break out in Germany.

Pope Gregory attempted to organize a crusade into Al-Andalus, led by Count Ebles II of Roucy.

=== Distant Christian countries ===
Gregory, in fact, established some relations with every country in Christendom; though these relations did not invariably realize the ecclesiastico-political hopes connected with them. His correspondence extended to Poland, Kyivan Rus', and Bohemia. He unsuccessfully tried to bring Armenia into closer contact with Rome.

=== Byzantine Empire ===
Gregory was particularly concerned with the East. The schism between Rome and the Byzantine Empire was a severe blow to him, and he worked hard to restore the former amicable relationship. Gregory attempted to contact the emperor Michael VII. When the news of the Muslim attacks on the Christians in the East filtered through to Rome, and the political embarrassments of the Byzantine emperor increased, he conceived the project of a great military expedition and exhorted the faithful to participate in recovering the Church of the Holy Sepulchre—foreshadowing the First Crusade. In his efforts to recruit for the expedition, he emphasized the suffering of eastern Christians, arguing western Christians had a moral obligation to go to their aid.

== Internal policy and reforms ==
Saint Gregory VII O.S.B.
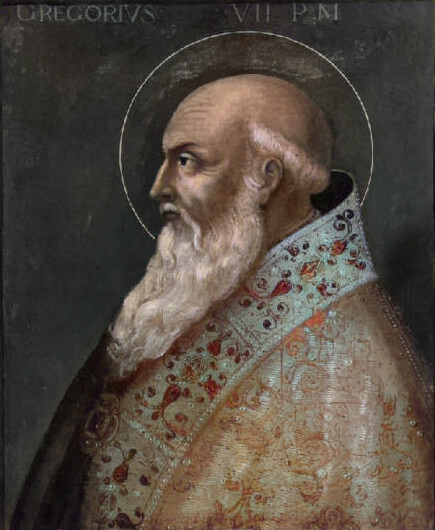

Pope; Confessor
- Born: Ildebrando di Soana; 1015; Sovana, March of Tuscany
- Died: 25 May 1085 (aged 69-70); Salerno, Duchy of Apulia
- Venerated in: Catholic Church
- Beatified: 25 May 1584, Saint Peter's Basilica, Papal States by Pope Gregory XIII
- Canonized: 24 May 1728, Saint Peter's Basilica, Papal States by Pope Benedict XIII
- Attributes: Papal vestments Papal tiara Benedictine habit
- Patronage: Diocese of Savona; Salerno

His lifework was based on his conviction that the Church was founded by God and entrusted with the task of embracing all humanity in a single society in which divine will is the basis of all law; that, in its capacity as a divine institution, it is supreme over all human structures, especially the secular state; and that the pope, in his role as head of the Church, is the vice-regent of God on earth, so that disobedience to him implies disobedience to God and a defection from Christianity. However, a political realization of this ideal would have required the abolition of all secular monarchs and authorities.

Thus, Gregory VII, as a practical politician, acknowledged the existence of the state as a dispensation of providence, admitted the coexistence of church and state as a divine ordinance, and emphasized the necessity of union between the sacerdotium and the imperium. But he absolutely refused to put the two powers on an equal footing; the superiority of the church over the state admitted of no doubt or discussion. He wished to see all important matters of dispute referred to Rome, ultimately to the pope himself, with a corresponding curtailment of the powers of bishops. Because they retained their traditional episcopal independence, his papacy is marked by struggles with the higher clergy.

This battle for the foundation of papal supremacy is connected with his championship of compulsory celibacy among the clergy and his attack on simony. Gregory VII did not introduce the celibacy of the priesthood into the Church, but he intensified the struggle more than his predecessors. In 1074, he issued an encyclical absolving the faithful from their obedience to bishops who permitted married priests. The next year, he enjoined them to take action against married priests and deprived these clerics of their revenues. Both the campaign against priestly marriage and that against simony provoked widespread resistance.

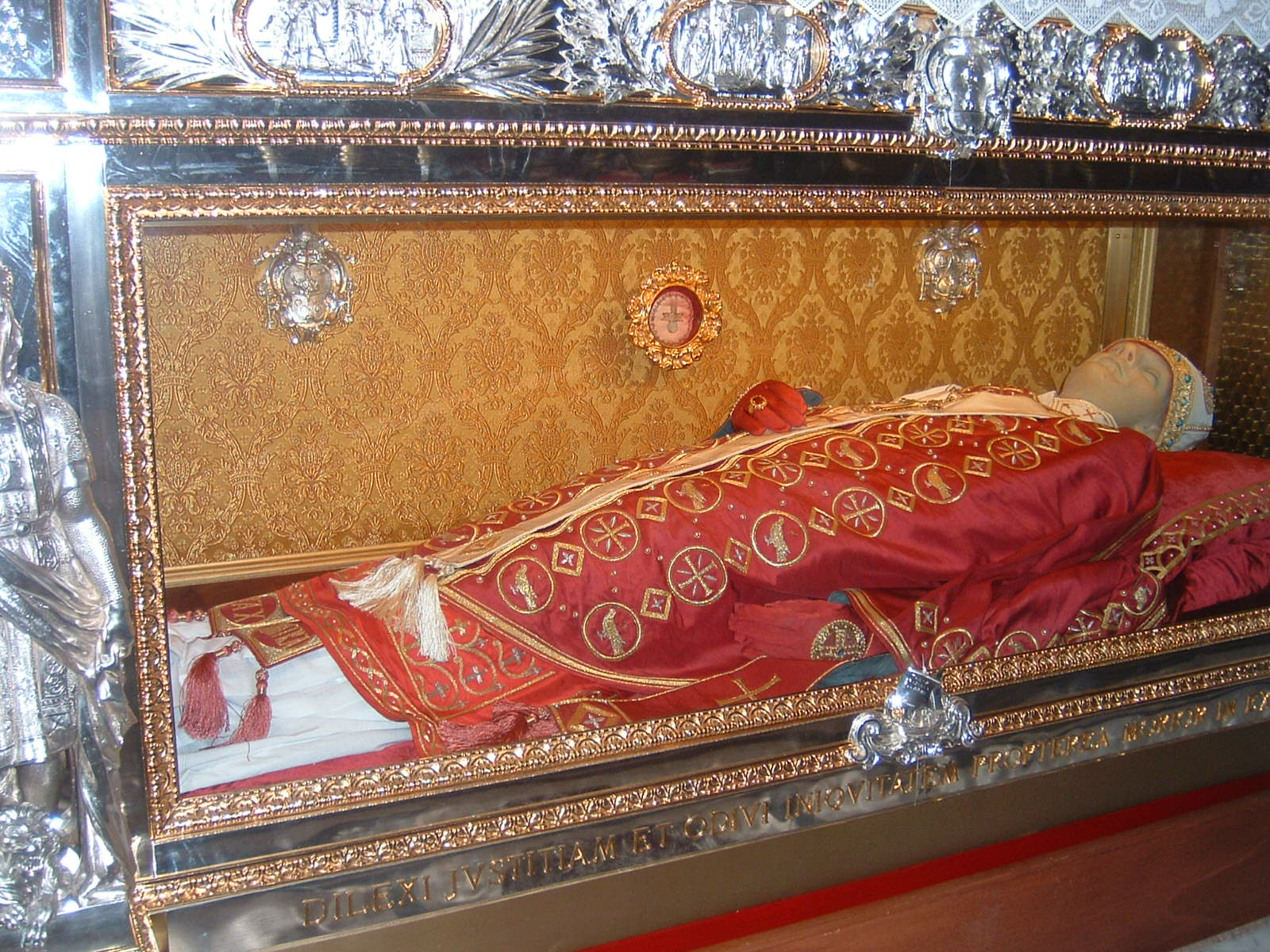
Wax funeral effigy of Gregory VII under glass in the Salerno cathedral.

His writings primarily treat the principles and practice of Church government. They may be found in Mansi's collection under the title "Gregorii VII registri sive epistolarum libri". Most of his surviving letters are preserved in his Register, which is now stored in the Vatican Archives.

Gregory VII's reforms to curb lay control of the Catholic Church have been characterized as a key factor in the rise of urban self-government in Europe.

Gregory VII was critical in the birth of modern universities, as his 1079 decree ordered the regulated establishment of the cathedral schools, which transformed into the first European universities.

== Doctrine of the Eucharist ==
Pope Paul VI regarded Gregory VII as instrumental in affirming the dogma of Christ's real presence in the Blessed Sacrament. Gregory's confession of this belief, imposed on Berengarius, was quoted in Pope Paul VI's 1965 encyclical Mysterium fidei:

I believe in my heart and openly profess that the bread and wine that are placed on the altar are, through the mystery of the sacred prayer and the words of the Redeemer, substantially changed into the true and proper and lifegiving flesh and blood of Jesus Christ our Lord, and that after the consecration they are the true body of Christ.

This profession of faith initiated a "Eucharistic Renaissance" in European churches, beginning in the 12th century.

== Death ==
Pope Gregory VII died in exile in Salerno; the epitaph on his sarcophagus in the city's Cathedral says: "I have loved justice and hated iniquity; therefore, I die in exile."

== Legacy ==
Gregory VII was beatified by Pope Gregory XIII in 1584 and canonized on 24 May 1728 by Pope Benedict XIII.

== See also ==
- Concordat of Worms
- Dictatus papae (1075–87)
- First Council of the Lateran
- Libertas ecclesiae
- List of popes

Catholic Church titles
Preceded by Alexander II	Pope; 1073–85	Succeeded by Victor III
