= September 30 =

September 30 this year in various calendars
- Wednesday, 30 September 2026
Akan	Kwawukuo
Armenian	12 Sahmi 1476
Aztec	Nēmontēmi 3, 4 Ozomahtli
Babylonian	17 Ululu, 2337 SE
Balinese pawukon	Luang, Pepet, Beteng, Sri, Keliwon, Was, Buda of Ugu, Sri, Ogan, Manuh
Bengali	15 Ashshin, BS 1433
Chinese	Yin Fire Goat・Wall Mansion; Fire Horse Year, Month 8, Day 20 (Qiufen, 8 days until Hanlu)
Common Era	30 September 2026 CE
Coptic	20 Thout, AM 1743
Egyptian	17 Mechir, 2775 NE
Ethiopian	20 Maskaram, 2019 Amätä Məhrät
French Republican	Décade I, Octidi de Vendémiaire de l'Année 235 de la République
Gregorian	30 September, AD 2026
Hebrew	19 Tishrei, AM 5787
Hindu	Bharaṇī・Harṣaṇa; Solar: 14 Āśvina, 1948 SE; Lunisolar: Caturthī, Kṛishna pakṣa of Bhādrapada, 2083 VE; Rāudra・5127 KY・1,872,848
Icelandic	Miðvikudagur, 7 Haustmánuður 2026
Islamic	17 Rabi' al-thani, AH 1448 (using tabular method)
ISO week date	2026-W40-3
Japanese	20 Hazuki, Reiwa 8 (Shūbun, 8 days until Kanro)
Julian	17 September, AD 2026 (AM 7534)
Julian day	2461314
Korean	20 Dakdal, 4359 DE
Maya	13.0.13.17.11; 4 Yax, 4 Chuen
Roman	ante diem XV Kalendas Octobres, MMDCCLXXIX AUC
Solar Hijri	8 Mehr, SH 1405
Tibetan	19 khrums, me pho rta 2153 or 1772 or 1000

<<	September					>>
Su	Mo	Tu	We	Th	Fr	Sa
		1	2	3	4	5
6	7	8	9	10	11	12
13	14	15	16	17	18	19
20	21	22	23	24	25	26
27	28	29	30
2026

September 30 in recent years
2026 (Wednesday)
2025 (Tuesday)
2024 (Monday)
2023 (Saturday)
2022 (Friday)
2021 (Thursday)
2020 (Wednesday)
2019 (Monday)
2018 (Sunday)
2017 (Saturday)

September 30 is the 273rd day of the year (274th in leap years) in the Gregorian calendar; 92 days remain until the end of the year.

== Events ==
=== Pre-1600 ===
- 489 – The Ostrogoths under Theoderic the Great defeat the forces of Odoacer for the second time.
- 737 – The Türgesh drive back an Umayyad invasion of Khuttal, follow them south of the Oxus, and capture their baggage train.
- 1061 – Election of Pope Alexander II following the death of Pope Nicholas II two months prior.
- 1139 – A magnitude 7.7 earthquake strikes the Caucasus mountains in the Seljuk Empire, causing mass destruction and killing up to 300,000 people.
- 1342 – Battle of Morlaix is fought in the Hundred Years' War.
- 1399 – Henry IV is proclaimed king of England.
- 1520 – Suleiman the Magnificent becomes sultan of the Ottoman Empire.
- 1541 – Spanish conquistador Hernando de Soto and his forces enter Tula territory in present-day western Arkansas, encountering fierce resistance.
- 1551 – A coup by the military establishment of Japan's Ōuchi clan forces their lord to commit suicide, and their city is burned.

=== 1601–1900 ===
- 1687 – The Venetians under Girolamo Corner take the city of Herceg Novi from the Ottoman Empire.
- 1736 – The Lebanese Council of 1736 begins, a major turning point in the reform of the Maronite Church. In the following three days, the assembled Maronite and Latin clergy presided by Yusuf ibn Siman as-Simani discuss various reforms and elaborate rules and canons.
- 1744 – War of the Austrian Succession: France and Spain defeat Sardinia at the Battle of Madonna dell'Olmo, but soon have to withdraw from Sardinia.
- 1791 – The first performance of Mozart's opera The Magic Flute takes place two months before his death.
- 1791 – France's National Constituent Assembly is dissolved, to be replaced the next day by the National Legislative Assembly.
- 1863 – Georges Bizet's opera Les pêcheurs de perles, premieres in Paris.
- 1882 – Thomas Edison's first commercial hydroelectric power plant, the Vulcan Street Plant, begins operation.
- 1888 – Jack the Ripper kills his third and fourth victims, Elizabeth Stride and Catherine Eddowes.
- 1895 - Friedrich Nietzsche finished writing The Antichrist, with the 7 propositions Law Against Christianity, marked by him as a Day of Salvation, Day and Year 1 of a new calendar.

=== 1901–present ===
- 1906 – The Royal Galician Academy, the Galician language's biggest linguistic authority, is established in La Coruña, Spain.
- 1907 – The McKinley National Memorial, the final resting place of assassinated U.S. President William McKinley and his family, is dedicated in Canton, Ohio.
- 1909 – The Cunard Line's RMS Mauretania makes a record-breaking westbound crossing of the Atlantic, that will not be bettered for 20 years.
- 1915 – World War I: Radoje Ljutovac becomes the first soldier in history to shoot down an enemy aircraft with ground-to-air fire.
- 1918 – Ukrainian War of Independence: Insurgent forces led by Nestor Makhno defeats the Central Powers at the battle of Dibrivka.
- 1919 – The Elaine massacre in Arkansas commences.
- 1935 – The Hoover Dam, astride the border between the U.S. states of Arizona and Nevada, is dedicated.
- 1936 – American journalists Herbert R. Ekins, reporter for the New York World-Telegram, Dorothy Kilgallen of the New York Journal and Leo Kieran of The New York Times start the race to travel around the world on commercial airline flights. The race takes 18 ½ days.
- 1938 – Britain, France, Germany and Italy sign the Munich Agreement, whereby Germany annexes the Sudetenland region of Czechoslovakia.
- 1938 – The League of Nations unanimously outlaws "intentional bombings of civilian populations".
- 1939 – World War II: General Władysław Sikorski becomes prime minister of the Polish government-in-exile.
- 1939 – NBC broadcasts the first televised American football game.
- 1941 – World War II: The Babi Yar massacre comes to an end.
- 1943 – The United States Merchant Marine Academy is dedicated by President Roosevelt.
- 1944 – World War II: the Germans commence a counter offensive to retake the Nijmegen salient, this having been captured by the allies during Operation Market Garden.
- 1945 – The Bourne End rail crash, in Hertfordshire, England, kills 43.
- 1947 – The 1947 World Series begins. It is the first to be televised, to include an African-American player, to exceed $2 million in receipts, to see a pinch-hit home run, and to have six umpires on the field.
- 1947 – Pakistan joins the United Nations.
- 1949 – The Berlin Airlift ends.
- 1954 – The U.S. Navy submarine USS Nautilus is commissioned as the world's first nuclear-powered vessel.
- 1960 – The Flintstones, the first prime-time animated sitcom, premieres on ABC television.
- 1966 – Bechuanaland declares its independence, and becomes the Republic of Botswana.
- 1968 – The Boeing 747 is rolled out and shown to the public for the first time.
- 1970 – Jordan makes a deal with the PFLP for the release of the remaining hostages from the Dawson's Field hijackings.
- 1975 – Malév Flight 240 crashes into the Mediterranean Sea while on approach to Beirut International Airport in Beirut, Lebanon, killing 60.
- 1978 – Finnair Flight 405 is hijacked by Aarno Lamminparras in Oulu, Finland.
- 1980 – Ethernet specifications are published by Xerox working with Intel and Digital Equipment Corporation.
- 1993 – The 6.2 M_{w} Latur earthquake shakes Maharashtra, India with a maximum Mercalli intensity of VIII (Severe) killing 9,748 and injuring 30,000.
- 1994 – Space Shuttle Endeavour is launched on STS-68.
- 1999 – The Tokaimura nuclear accident causes the deaths of two technicians in Japan's second-worst nuclear accident.
- 2000 – Israeli–Palestinian conflict: Twelve-year-old Muhammad al-Durrah is shot and killed on the second day of the Second Intifada.
- 2005 – Controversial drawings of Muhammad are printed in a Danish newspaper.
- 2009 – The 7.6 M_{w} Sumatra earthquake leaves 1,115 people dead.
- 2016 – Hurricane Matthew becomes a Category 5 hurricane, making it the strongest hurricane to form in the Caribbean Sea since 2007.
- 2016 – Two paintings with a combined value of $100 million are recovered after having been stolen from the Van Gogh Museum in 2002.

== Births ==
=== Pre-1600 ===
- 1207 – Rumi, Persian mystic and poet (died 1273)
- 1227 – Pope Nicholas IV (died 1292)
- 1530 – Girolamo Mercuriale, Italian philologist and physician (died 1606)
- 1550 – Michael Maestlin, German astronomer and mathematician (died 1631)

=== 1601–1900 ===
- 1622 – Johann Sebastiani, German composer (died 1683)
- 1689 – Jacques Aubert, French violinist and composer (died 1753)
- 1700 – Stanisław Konarski, Polish monk, poet, and playwright (died 1773)
- 1710 – John Russell, 4th Duke of Bedford, English politician, Lord President of the Council (died 1771)
- 1714 – Étienne Bonnot de Condillac, French epistemologist and philosopher (died 1780)
- 1732 – Jacques Necker, Swiss-French politician, Prime Minister of France (died 1804)
- 1743 – Christian Ehregott Weinlig, German cantor and composer (died 1813)
- 1765 – José María Morelos, Mexican priest and general (died 1815)
- 1800 – Decimus Burton, English architect, designed the Pharos Lighthouse (died 1881)
- 1813 – John Rae, Scottish physician and explorer (died 1893)
- 1814 – Lucinda Hinsdale Stone, American feminist, educator, and philanthropist (died 1900)
- 1827 – Ellis H. Roberts, American journalist and politician, 20th Treasurer of the United States (died 1918)
- 1827 – Peter Ward, New York politician (died 1891)
- 1832 – Ann Jarvis, American activist, co-founded Mother's Day (died 1905)
- 1836 – Remigio Morales Bermúdez, Peruvian politician, President of Peru (died 1894)
- 1852 – Charles Villiers Stanford, Irish composer, conductor, and educator (died 1924)
- 1861 – William Wrigley Jr., American businessman, founded Wrigley Company (died 1932)
- 1863 – Reinhard Scheer, German admiral (died 1928)
- 1870 – Thomas W. Lamont, American banker and philanthropist (died 1948)
- 1870 – Jean Baptiste Perrin, French-American physicist and chemist, Nobel Prize laureate (died 1942)
- 1882 – Hans Geiger, German physicist and academic (died 1945)
- 1883 – Bernhard Rust, German educator and politician (died 1945)
- 1883 – Nora Stanton Blatch Barney, American civil engineer, architect, and suffragist (died 1971)
- 1887 – Lil Dagover, Indonesian-German actress (died 1980)
- 1893 – Lansdale Ghiselin Sasscer, American lieutenant, lawyer, and politician (died 1964)
- 1895 – Lewis Milestone, Moldovan-American director, producer, and screenwriter (died 1980)
- 1897 – Alfred Wintle, Russian-English soldier and politician (died 1966)
- 1897 – Charlotte Wolff, German-English physician and psychotherapist (died 1986)
- 1898 – Renée Adorée, French-American actress (died 1933)
- 1898 – Princess Charlotte, Duchess of Valentinois (died 1977)
- 1898 – Edgar Parin d'Aulaire, German-American author and illustrator (died 1986)

=== 1901–present ===
- 1901 – Thelma Terry, American bassist and bandleader (died 1966)
- 1904 – Waldo Williams, Welsh poet and academic (died 1971)
- 1905 – Nevill Francis Mott, English physicist and academic, Nobel Prize laureate (died 1996)
- 1905 – Michael Powell, English director, producer, and screenwriter (died 1990)
- 1906 – Mireille Hartuch, French singer-songwriter and actress (died 1996)
- 1908 – David Oistrakh, Ukrainian-Russian violinist and educator (died 1974)
- 1910 – Jussi Kekkonen, Finnish captain (died 1962)
- 1911 – Gustave Gilbert, American psychologist (died 1977)
- 1912 – Kenny Baker, American singer and actor (died 1985)
- 1913 – Bill Walsh, American screenwriter and producer (died 1975)
- 1915 – Lester Maddox, American businessman and politician, 75th Governor of Georgia (died 2003)
- 1917 – Yuri Lyubimov, Russian actor and director (died 2014)
- 1917 – Buddy Rich, American drummer, bandleader, and actor (died 1987)
- 1918 – Lewis Nixon, U.S. Army captain (died 1995)
- 1918 – René Rémond, French historian and economist (died 2007)
- 1919 – Roberto Bonomi, Argentinian race car driver (died 1992)
- 1919 – Elizabeth Gilels, Ukrainian-Russian violinist and educator (died 2008)
- 1919 – William L. Guy, American lieutenant and politician, 26th Governor of North Dakota (died 2013)
- 1919 – Patricia Neway, American soprano and actress (died 2012)
- 1921 – Deborah Kerr, Scottish-English actress (died 2007)
- 1921 – Aldo Parisot, Brazilian-American cellist and educator (died 2018)
- 1922 – Lamont Johnson, American actor, director, and producer (died 2010)
- 1922 – Hrishikesh Mukherjee, Indian director, producer, and screenwriter (died 2006)
- 1923 – Donald Swann, Welsh-English pianist and composer (died 1994)
- 1924 – Truman Capote, American novelist, playwright, and screenwriter (died 1984)
- 1925 – Arkady Ostashev, Russian engineer and scientist in the former Soviet space program (died 1998)
- 1926 – Heino Kruus, Estonian basketball player and coach (died 2012)
- 1926 – Robin Roberts, American baseball player, coach, and sportscaster (died 2010)
- 1927 – W. S. Merwin, American poet and translator (died 2019)
- 1928 – Elie Wiesel, Romanian-American author, academic, and activist, Nobel Prize laureate (died 2016)
- 1928 – Ray Willsey, Canadian-American football player and coach (died 2013)
- 1929 – Carol Fenner, American author and illustrator (died 2002)
- 1929 – Vassilis Papazachos, Greek seismologist and academic (died 2022)
- 1929 – Leticia Ramos-Shahani, Filipino politician, diplomat and writer (died 2017)
- 1929 – Dorothee Sölle, German theologian and author (died 2003)
- 1931 – Angie Dickinson, American actress
- 1931 – Teresa Gorman, English educator and politician (died 2015)
- 1932 – Shintaro Ishihara, Japanese author, playwright, and politician, Governor of Tokyo (died 2022)
- 1932 – Johnny Podres, American baseball player and coach (died 2008)
- 1933 – Cissy Houston, American singer (died 2024)
- 1934 – Alan A'Court, English footballer and manager (died 2009)
- 1934 – Udo Jürgens, Austrian-Swiss singer-songwriter and pianist (died 2014)
- 1934 – Anna Kashfi, Indian-American actress (died 2015)
- 1935 – Johnny Mathis, American singer and actor
- 1936 – Jim Sasser, American lawyer and politician, 6th United States Ambassador to China (died 2024)
- 1936 – Sevgi Soysal, Turkish author (died 1976)
- 1937 – Jurek Becker, Polish-German author (died 1997)
- 1937 – Valentyn Sylvestrov, Ukrainian pianist and composer
- 1937 – Gary Hocking, Rhodesian motorcycle racer (died 1962)
- 1938 – Alan Hacker, English clarinet player and educator (died 2012)
- 1939 – Len Cariou, Canadian actor
- 1939 – Anthony Green, English painter and academic (died 2023)
- 1939 – Jean-Marie Lehn, French chemist and academic, Nobel Prize laureate
- 1940 – Claudia Card, American philosopher and academic (died 2015)
- 1940 – Harry Jerome, Canadian sprinter (died 1982)
- 1940 – Dewey Martin, Canadian-American drummer (died 2009)
- 1941 – Samuel F. Pickering Jr., American author and educator
- 1941 – Kamalesh Sharma, Indian academic and diplomat, 5th Commonwealth Secretary General
- 1941 – Reine Wisell, Swedish race car driver (died 2022)
- 1942 – Gus Dudgeon, English record producer (died 2002)
- 1942 – Frankie Lymon, American singer-songwriter (died 1968)
- 1943 – Johann Deisenhofer, German-American biochemist and biophysicist, Nobel Prize laureate
- 1943 – Marilyn McCoo, American singer
- 1943 – Philip Moore, English organist and composer
- 1943 – Ian Ogilvy, English-American actor, playwright, and author
- 1944 – Diane Dufresne, Canadian singer and painter
- 1944 – Jimmy Johnstone, Scottish footballer (died 2006)
- 1944 – Red Robbins, American basketball player (died 2009)
- 1945 – Richard Edwin Hills, English astronomer and academic (died 2022)
- 1945 – Ehud Olmert, Israeli lawyer and politician, 12th Prime Minister of Israel
- 1946 – Fran Brill, American actress, singer, and puppeteer
- 1946 – Robert Gascoyne-Cecil, 7th Marquess of Salisbury, English academic and politician, Leader of the House of Lords
- 1946 – Héctor Lavoe, Puerto Rican-American singer-songwriter (died 1993)
- 1946 – Jochen Mass, German race car driver (died 2025)
- 1946 – Paul Sheahan, Australian cricketer and educator
- 1946 – Claude Vorilhon, French journalist, founded Raëlism
- 1947 – Marc Bolan, English singer-songwriter and guitarist (died 1977)
- 1947 – Rula Lenska, English actress
- 1948 – Craig Kusick, American baseball player and coach (died 2006)
- 1949 – Michel Tognini, French pilot, engineer, military officer and astronaut
- 1950 – Laura Esquivel, Mexican author and screenwriter
- 1950 – Victoria Tennant, English actress and dancer
- 1951 – John Lloyd, English screenwriter and producer
- 1951 – Barry Marshall, Australian physician and academic, Nobel Prize laureate
- 1951 – Simon White, English astrophysicist and academic
- 1952 – John Finn, American actor
- 1952 – John Lombardo, American singer-songwriter and guitarist
- 1953 – Matt Abts, American drummer
- 1953 – Deborah Allen, American country music singer-songwriter, author, and actress
- 1954 – Basia, Polish singer-songwriter and record producer
- 1954 – John Drew, American basketball player (died 2022)
- 1954 – Scott Fields, American guitarist and composer
- 1954 – Patrice Rushen, American singer-songwriter and producer
- 1954 – Barry Williams, American actor
- 1955 – Andy Bechtolsheim, German engineer, co-founded Sun Microsystems
- 1955 – Frankie Kennedy, Northern Irish flute player (died 1994)
- 1956 – Trevor Morgan, English footballer and manager
- 1957 – Fran Drescher, American actress, producer, and screenwriter
- 1958 – Marty Stuart, American singer-songwriter and guitarist
- 1959 – Ettore Messina, Italian basketball player and coach
- 1960 – Julia Adamson, Canadian-English keyboard player, composer, and producer
- 1960 – Nicola Griffith, English-American author
- 1960 – Miki Howard, American singer-songwriter, producer, and actress
- 1960 – Blanche Lincoln, American politician
- 1961 – Crystal Bernard, American actress and singer-songwriter
- 1961 – Gary Coyne, Australian rugby league player
- 1961 – Eric Stoltz, American actor, director, and producer
- 1961 – Mel Stride, English politician
- 1961 – Eric van de Poele, Belgian race car driver
- 1962 – Marley Marl, American record producer and rapper
- 1963 – David Barbe, American bass player and producer
- 1964 – Trey Anastasio, American singer-songwriter, guitarist, and composer
- 1964 – Monica Bellucci, Italian actress and fashion model
- 1965 – Omid Djalili, English comedian, actor, and producer
- 1966 – Gary Armstrong, Scottish rugby player
- 1966 – Markus Burger, German pianist, composer, and educator
- 1966 – Club Chalamet, American social media personality
- 1966 – Angus Taylor, Australian politician
- 1967 – Emmanuelle Houdart, Swiss-French author and illustrator
- 1967 – Gibby Haynes, American musician, radio personality and painter
- 1967 – Andrea Roth, Canadian actress
- 1969 – Gintaras Einikis, Lithuanian basketball player
- 1969 – Amy Landecker, American actress
- 1969 – Silas Weir Mitchell, American actor
- 1969 – Chris von Erich, American wrestler (died 1991)
- 1970 – Tony Hale, American actor and producer
- 1970 – Damian Mori, Australian footballer and manager
- 1970 – Eric Piatkowski, American basketball player
- 1971 – Jenna Elfman, American actress and producer
- 1972 – Jamal Anderson, American football player and sportscaster
- 1972 – Ari Behn, Danish-Norwegian author and playwright (died 2019)
- 1972 – Mayumi Kojima, Japanese singer-songwriter
- 1972 – José Lima, Dominican baseball player (died 2010)
- 1973 – Rubén Wolkowyski, Argentine basketball player
- 1974 – Jeremy Giambi, American baseball player (died 2022)
- 1974 – Tom Greatrex, English politician
- 1974 – Daniel Wu, American–born Hong Kong actor, director, and producer
- 1975 – Jay Asher, American author
- 1975 – Ta-Nehisi Coates, American author and journalist
- 1975 – Marion Cotillard, French actress and singer
- 1975 – Carlos Guillén, Venezuelan baseball player
- 1975 – Laure Pequegnot, French skier
- 1975 – Christopher Jackson, American actor, singer, musician, and composer
- 1977 – Roy Carroll, Northern Irish goalkeeper and manager
- 1977 – Nick Curran, American singer-songwriter, guitarist, and producer (died 2012)
- 1978 – Małgorzata Glinka-Mogentale, Polish volleyball player
- 1978 – Candice Michelle, American wrestler
- 1979 – Cameron Bruce, Australian footballer and coach
- 1979 – Andy van der Meyde, Dutch footballer
- 1980 – Martina Hingis, Swiss tennis player
- 1980 – Milagros Sequera, Venezuelan tennis player
- 1980 – Toni Trucks, American actress
- 1981 – Cecelia Ahern, Irish author
- 1981 – Dominique Moceanu, American gymnast
- 1982 – Lacey Chabert, American actress
- 1982 – Ryane Clowe, Canadian ice hockey player
- 1982 – Kieran Culkin, American actor
- 1982 – Andrew Hastie, Australian politician
- 1982 – Seth Smith, American baseball player
- 1983 – Adam Jones, American football player and analyst
- 1983 – Andreea Răducan, Romanian gymnast
- 1984 – T-Pain, American rapper, producer, and actor
- 1985 – Adam Cooney, Australian footballer
- 1985 – Téa Obreht, Serbian-American author
- 1985 – Cristian Rodríguez, Uruguayan footballer
- 1986 – Jarron Gilbert, American footballer
- 1986 – Olivier Giroud, French footballer
- 1986 – Martin Guptill, New Zealand cricketer
- 1986 – Ben Lovett, Welsh musician and songwriter
- 1986 – Cristián Zapata, Colombian footballer
- 1987 – Aida Garifullina, Russian operatic soprano
- 1987 – Kenley Jansen, Curaçaoan baseball player
- 1988 – Natalie Eggermont, Belgian politician
- 1989 – Jasmine Thomas, American basketball player
- 1991 – David Bakhtiari, American football player
- 1991 – Joffrey Lauvergne, French basketball player
- 1991 – Thomas Röhler, German javelin thrower
- 1992 – Bria Hartley, French-American basketball player
- 1992 – Ezra Miller, American actor and singer
- 1994 – Aliya Mustafina, Russian gymnast
- 1996 – Aaron Holiday, American basketball player
- 1997 – Yana Kudryavtseva, Russian gymnast
- 1997 – Max Verstappen, Dutch race car driver
- 1998 – Landon Dickerson, American football player
- 1998 – Yui Imaizumi, Japanese actress, singer, model, and television personality
- 1998 – Trevi Moran, American YouTuber and singer
- 2002 – Levi Miller, Australian actor and model
- 2002 – Maddie Ziegler, American dancer and actress
- 2003 – Alberto Moleiro, Spanish footballer

== Deaths ==
=== Pre-1600 ===
- 420 – Jerome, Roman priest, theologian, and saint
- 653 – Honorius of Canterbury, Italian archbishop and saint
- 940 – Fan Yanguang, Chinese general
- 954 – Louis IV of France (born 920)
- 1101 – Anselm IV, Italian archbishop
- 1246 – Yaroslav II of Vladimir (born 1191)
- 1288 – Leszek II the Black, Polish prince, Duke of Łęczyca, Sieradz, Kraków, Sandomierz (born 1241)
- 1376 – Adelaide of Vianden, German countess
- 1440 – Reginald Grey, 3rd Baron Grey de Ruthyn, Welsh soldier and politician (born 1362)
- 1487 – John Sutton, 1st Baron Dudley, English politician, Lord Lieutenant of Ireland (born 1400)
- 1551 – Ōuchi Yoshitaka, Japanese daimyō (born 1507)
- 1560 – Melchior Cano, Spanish theologian (born 1525)
- 1572 – Francis Borgia, 4th Duke of Gandía, Spanish priest and saint, 3rd Superior General of the Society of Jesus (born 1510)
- 1581 – Hubert Languet, French diplomat and reformer (born 1518)

=== 1601–1900 ===
- 1626 – Nurhaci, Chinese emperor (born 1559)
- 1628 – Fulke Greville, 1st Baron Brooke, English poet and politician, Chancellor of the Exchequer (born 1554)
- 1770 – Thomas Robinson, 1st Baron Grantham, English politician and diplomat, Secretary of State for the Southern Department (born 1695)
- 1770 – George Whitefield, English-American priest and theologian (born 1714)
- 1865 – Samuel David Luzzatto, Italian poet and scholar (born 1800)
- 1866 – Per Gustaf Svinhufvud af Qvalstad, treasurer of Tavastia province, manor host, and paternal grandfather of President of Finland P. E. Svinhufvud (born 1804)
- 1891 – Georges Ernest Boulanger, French general and politician, French Minister of War (born 1837)
- 1897 – Thérèse of Lisieux, French nun and saint (born 1873)

=== 1901–present ===
- 1910 – Maurice Lévy, French mathematician and engineer (born 1838)
- 1921 – Fanya Baron, Lithuanian Jewish anarchist (born 1887)
- 1942 – Hans-Joachim Marseille, German captain and pilot (born 1919)
- 1943 – Franz Oppenheimer, German-American sociologist and economist (born 1864)
- 1946 – Takashi Sakai, Japanese general and politician, Governor of Hong Kong (born 1887)
- 1955 – James Dean, American actor (born 1931)
- 1959 – Henry Barwell, Australian politician, 28th Premier of South Australia (born 1877)
- 1961 – Onésime Gagnon, Canadian scholar and politician, 20th Lieutenant Governor of Quebec (born 1888)
- 1973 – Peter Pitseolak, Canadian photographer and author (born 1902)
- 1974 – Carlos Prats, Chilean general and politician, Chilean Minister of Defense (born 1915)
- 1977 – Mary Ford, American singer and guitarist (born 1924)
- 1978 – Edgar Bergen, American actor and ventriloquist (born 1903)
- 1985 – Charles Francis Richter, American seismologist and physicist (born 1900)
- 1985 – Simone Signoret, French actress (born 1921)
- 1986 – Nicholas Kaldor, Hungarian-British economist (born 1908)
- 1987 – Alfred Bester, American author and screenwriter (born 1913)
- 1988 – Al Holbert, American race car driver (born 1946)
- 1989 – Drew Shafer, American LGBT rights activist (born 1936)
- 1989 – Virgil Thomson, American composer and critic (born 1896)
- 1990 – Rob Moroso, American race car driver (born 1968)
- 1990 – Alice Parizeau, Polish-Canadian journalist and author (born 1930)
- 1990 – Patrick White, Australian novelist, poet, and playwright, Nobel Prize laureate (born 1912)
- 1991 – Toma Zdravković, Serbian singer-songwriter (born 1938)
- 1994 – André Michel Lwoff, French microbiologist and virologist, Nobel Prize laureate (born 1902)
- 1998 – Marius Goring, English actor (born 1912)
- 1998 – Dan Quisenberry, American baseball player and poet (born 1953)
- 1998 – Robert Lewis Taylor, American soldier and author (born 1912)
- 2002 – Göran Kropp, Swedish race car driver and mountaineer (born 1966)
- 2002 – Hans-Peter Tschudi, Swiss lawyer and politician, 63rd President of the Swiss Confederation (born 1913)
- 2003 – Yusuf Bey, American activist, founded Your Black Muslim Bakery (born 1935)
- 2003 – Ronnie Dawson, American singer-songwriter and guitarist (born 1939)
- 2003 – Robert Kardashian, American lawyer and businessman (born 1944)
- 2004 – Gamini Fonseka, Sri Lankan actor, director, and politician (born 1936)
- 2004 – Jacques Levy, American director and songwriter (born 1935)
- 2004 – Michael Relph, English director, producer, and screenwriter (born 1915)
- 2008 – J. B. Jeyaretnam, Singaporean lawyer and politician (born 1926)
- 2010 – Stephen J. Cannell, American screenwriter and producer (born 1941)
- 2011 – Anwar al-Awlaki, American-Yemeni terrorist (born 1971)
- 2011 – Ralph M. Steinman, Canadian-American immunologist and biologist, Nobel Prize laureate (born 1943)
- 2012 – Turhan Bey, Austrian actor and producer (born 1922)
- 2012 – Barry Commoner, American biologist, academic, and politician (born 1917)
- 2012 – Bobby Jaggers, American wrestler and engineer (born 1948)
- 2012 – Clara Stanton Jones, American librarian (born 1913)
- 2012 – Barbara Ann Scott, Canadian-American figure skater (born 1928)
- 2012 – Boris Šprem, Croatian lawyer and politician, 8th Speaker of the Croatian Parliament (born 1956)
- 2013 – Janet Powell, Australian educator and politician (born 1942)
- 2014 – Martin Lewis Perl, American physicist and engineer, Nobel Prize laureate (born 1927)
- 2015 – Guido Altarelli, Italian-Swiss physicist and academic (born 1941)
- 2015 – Claude Dauphin, French businessman (born 1951)
- 2015 – Göran Hägg, Swedish author and critic (born 1947)
- 2017 – Monty Hall, American game show host (born 1921)
- 2017 – Vladimir Voevodsky, Russian-American mathematician (born 1966)
- 2018 – Kim Larsen, Danish rock musician (born 1945)
- 2018 – Geoffrey Hayes, British television presenter and actor (born 1942)
- 2018 – Sonia Orbuch, Polish resistance fighter during the Second World War and Holocaust educator. (born 1925)
- 2019 – Victoria Braithwaite, British research scientist who proved fish feel pain (born 1967)
- 2021 – Koichi Sugiyama, Japanese composer and orchestrator (born 1931)
- 2024 – Gavin Creel, American actor, singer and songwriter (born 1976)
- 2024 – Dikembe Mutombo, Congolese-American basketball player (born 1966)
- 2024 – Humberto Ortega, Nicaraguan military leader (born 1947)
- 2024 – Ken Page, American actor and cabaret singer (born 1954)
- 2024 – Pete Rose, American baseball player and manager (born 1941)
- 2026 – Esther Rantzen, English journalist and television presenter (born 1940)

== Holidays and observances ==
- Agricultural Reform (Nationalization) Day (São Tomé and Príncipe)
- Birth of Morelos (Mexico)
- Boy's Day (Poland)
- Christian feast day:
  - Blessed Federico Albert
  - Gregory the Illuminator
  - Honorius of Canterbury
  - Jerome
  - September 30 (Eastern Orthodox liturgics)
- Independence Day (Botswana) or Botswana Day, celebrates the independence of Botswana from United Kingdom in 1966.
- International Translation Day (International Federation of Translators)
- National Day for Truth and Reconciliation or Orange Shirt Day (Canada)
