= History of the papacy (1048–1257) =

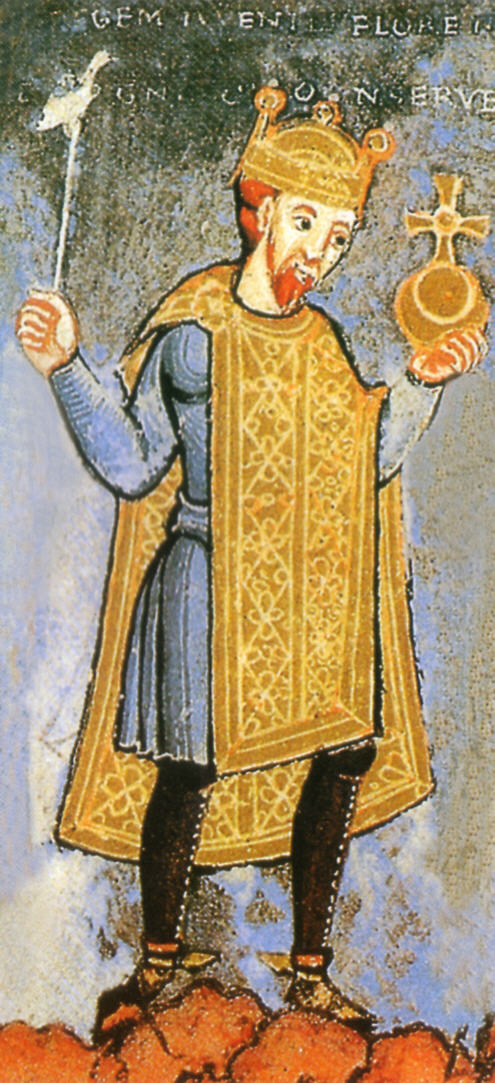
Henry III, Holy Roman Emperor found three rival popes when he visited Rome in 1048 because of the unprecedented actions of Pope Benedict IX. He deposed all three and installed his own preferred candidate: Pope Clement II.

The history of the papacy from 1046 to 1216 was marked by conflict between popes and the Holy Roman Emperor, most prominently the Investiture Controversy, a dispute over who— pope or emperor— could appoint bishops within the Empire. Henry IV's Walk to Canossa in 1077 to meet Pope Gregory VII (1073–85), although not dispositive within the context of the larger dispute, has become legendary. Although the emperor renounced any right to lay investiture in the Concordat of Worms (1122), the issue would flare up again.

The Imperial crown once held by the Carolingian emperors was disputed between their fractured heirs and local overlords; none emerged victorious until Otto I, Holy Roman Emperor invaded Italy. Large parts of northern and central Italy became a constituent kingdom of the Holy Roman Empire in 962, from which point emperors were Germanic. As emperors consolidated their position, northern Italian city-states would become divided by Guelphs and Ghibellines.

Long-standing divisions between East and West also came to a head in the East-West Schism and the Crusades. The first seven Ecumenical Councils had been attended by both Western and Eastern prelates, but growing doctrinal, theological, linguistic, political, and geographic differences finally resulted in mutual denunciations and excommunications. Pope Urban II (1088–99) speech at the Council of Clermont in 1095 became the rallying cry of the First Crusade.

Unlike the previous millennium, the process for papal selection became somewhat fixed during this period. Pope Nicholas II promulgated In Nomine Domini in 1059, which limited suffrage in papal elections to the College of Cardinals. The rules and procedures of papal elections evolved during this period, laying the groundwork for the modern papal conclave. The driving force behind these reforms was Cardinal Hildebrand, who later became Gregory VII.

== History ==
=== Investiture Controversy ===
The Investiture Controversy was the most significant conflict between secular and religious powers in medieval Europe. It began as a dispute in the 11th century between the Holy Roman Emperor Henry IV, and the Gregorian Papacy concerning who would control appointments of church officials (investiture). The controversy, undercutting the Imperial power established by the Salian Emperors, would eventually lead to nearly fifty years of civil war in Germany, the triumph of the great dukes and abbots, and the disintegration of the German empire, a condition from which it would not recover until the unification of Germany in the 19th century.

In 1046, Henry III deposed three rival popes. Over the next ten years, he personally selected four of the next five pontiffs. But after the death of Henry III, the pope quickly moved to change the system to prevent such secular involvement in the election of future popes.

The eleventh century is often called the century of Saxon popes: Pope Gregory VI (1045–1046), Pope Clement II (1046–1047), Pope Damasus II (1048), Pope Leo IX (1049–1054), Pope Victor II (1055–1057) and Pope Stephen IX (1057–1058).

Three popes Benedict IX, Sylvester III and Gregory VI all claimed to be the rightful pope. Henry III deposed all three and held a synod where he declared no Roman priest fit for the title of pope. He subsequently appointed Suidger of Bamberg who, after being duly acclaimed by the people and clergy, took the name Clement II.

Days later, Clement II then crowned Henry emperor. Over the next ten years, Henry personally selected four of the next five pontiffs. The ascendancy of these to the papacy reflected the strength and power of the Holy Roman Emperor. However, Henry was the last emperor to dominate the papacy in this way because, after his death, the pope quickly moved to change the system to prevent such secular involvement in the election of future popes.

The struggle between the temporal power of the emperors and the spiritual influence of the popes came to a head in the reigns of Pope Nicholas II (1059–1061) and Pope Gregory VII (1073–1085). The popes fought to free the appointment of bishops, abbots and other prelates from the power of secular lords and monarchs into which it had fallen. This would prevent venal men being appointed to vital church positions because it benefited political rulers. Henry IV was ultimately driven by a revolt among the German nobles to make peace with the pope and appeared before Gregory in January 1077 at Canossa. Dressed as a penitent, the emperor is said to have stood barefoot in the snow for three days and begged forgiveness until, in Gregory's words: "We loosed the chain of the anathema and at length received him into the favor of communion and into the lap of the Holy Mother Church".

=== Electoral reform ===
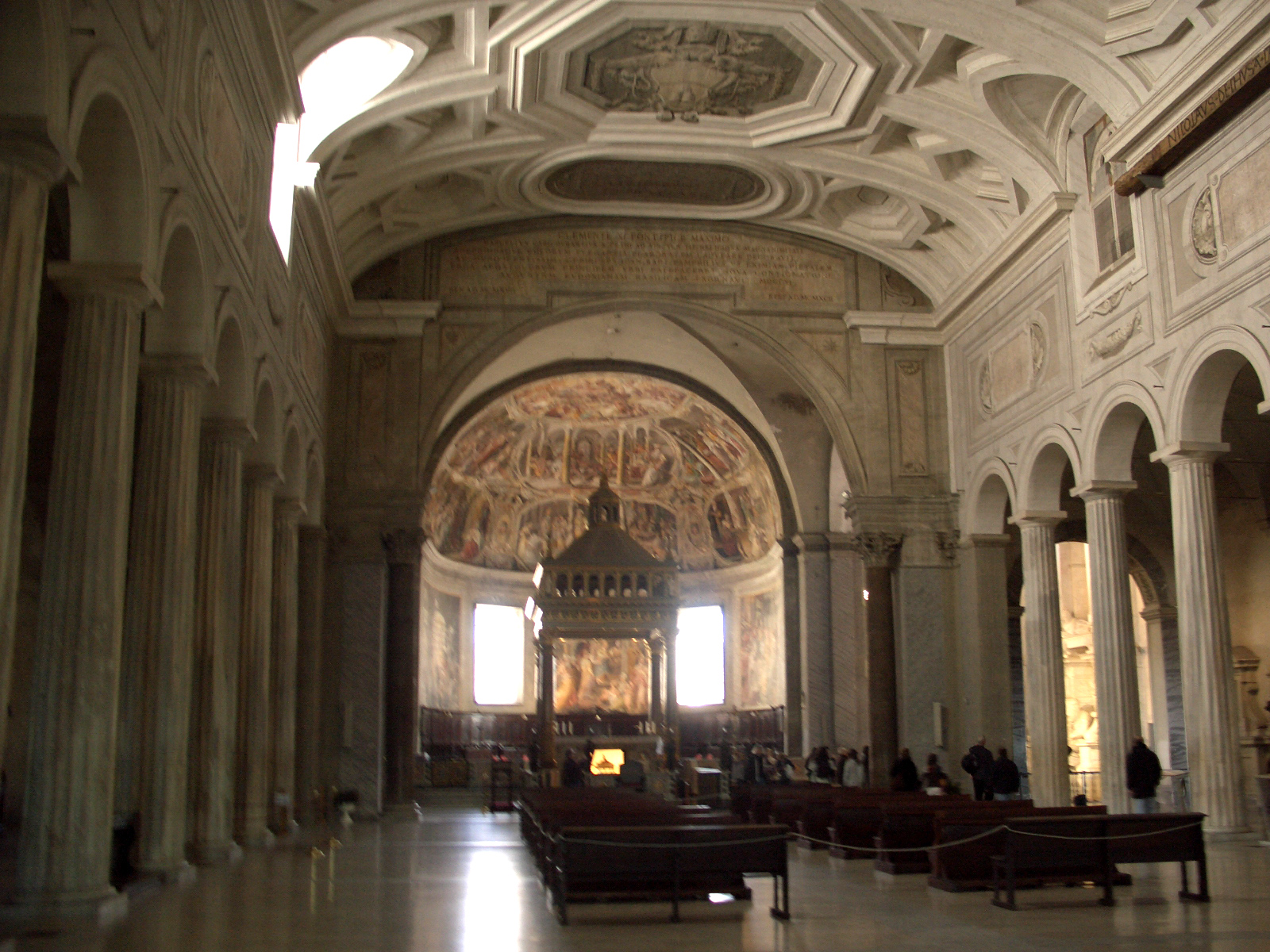
San Pietro in Vincoli, the site of the papal election, 1061, the first to exclude the laity

Pope Nicholas II, elected in 1058, initiated a process of reform which exposed the underlying tension between empire and papacy. In 1059, at a synod in Rome, Nicholas condemned various abuses within the church, and issued In Nomine Domini. These included simony (the selling of clerical posts), the marriage of clergy and, more controversially, corrupt practices in papal elections. Nicholas then restricted the choice of a new pope to a conclave of cardinals, thus ruling out any direct influence by secular powers. The primary objective of these actions was to restrict the influence of the Holy Roman Emperor on papal elections. In 1061, the assembled bishops of Germany, the emperor's own faction, declared all the decrees of this pope null and void.

In 1059, Nicholas II took two steps of a kind which, while unusual at this period, would later become commonplace for the medieval papacy. He granted land, which was already occupied, to recipients of his own choice, engaging those recipients in a feudal relationship with the papacy, or the Holy See, as the feudal lord. The beneficiaries of Nicholas' land grants were the Normans, who were granted territorial rights in southern Italy and Sicily in return for feudal obligations to Rome.

These tensions between emperors and pontiffs were to continue into the twelfth century and ultimately gave rise to the "distinctive separation of Church and State when the emperor signed the Concordat of Worms (1122) forfeiting any right to invest bishops with the ring and the staff symbolic of spiritual authority". Papal victory was short-lived, and this attempted separation of the secular from the ecclesiastical did not end aspirations on the part of the emperors to influence the papacy, nor the aspirations of the popes to exercise political power.

During the reign of Pope Gregory VII, the title “pope” was officially restricted to the bishop of Rome. Gregory VII was also responsible for greatly expanding the power of the papacy in worldly matters. One of the great reforming popes, Gregory is perhaps best known for the part he played in the Investiture Controversy, which pitted him against Emperor Henry IV, and the Gregorian Reform process.

=== East-West Schism ===
The East-West Schism was the event that divided Chalcedonian Christianity into Western Catholicism and Eastern Orthodoxy. Though normally dated to 1054, the East-West Schism was actually the result of an extended period of estrangement between the two Churches. The primary causes of the Schism were disputes over papal authority— the pope claimed he held authority over the four Eastern Greek-speaking patriarchs, and over the insertion of the filioque clause into the Nicene Creed by the Western Church. Eastern Orthodox today claim that the primacy of the Patriarch of Rome was primarily one of honor and appellate authority, not one of immediate authority across jurisdictional lines, and without the authority to change the decisions of Ecumenical Councils. There were other, less significant catalysts for the Schism, including variance over liturgical practices and conflicting claims of jurisdiction.

The Church split along doctrinal, theological, linguistic, political, and geographic lines, and the fundamental breach has never been healed. Attempts were made to reunite the two churches in 1274 (by the Second Council of Lyon) and in 1439 (by the Council of Basel), but in each case the councils were repudiated by the Orthodox as a whole, charging that the hierarchs had overstepped their authority in consenting to these so-called "unions". Further attempts to reconcile the two bodies have failed.

Byzantine emperor Alexius Comnenus asked Pope Urban II (1088–1099) for help against the Turks in the early 1090s. Urban II viewed this request as a great opportunity. Not only could it restore Christian control over the Holy Land, but it also provided a means of domestic pacification that focused the aggression of the European nobility towards the Muslims instead of each other. In addition, coming to the aid of Byzantium held the possibility of a reunion between the eastern and western Churches after almost four decades of schism, thereby strengthening the western Church in general and the papacy in particular.

On November 27, 1095, Urban II made one of the most influential speeches in the Middle Ages at the Council of Clermont combining the ideas of making a pilgrimage to the Holy Land with that of waging a holy war against infidels. The pope called for a “War of the Cross,” or Crusade, to retake the holy lands from the unbelievers. France, the pope said, was already overcrowded and the Holy Lands of Canaan were overflowing with milk and honey. Pope Urban II asked the Frenchmen to turn their swords in favor of God's service, and the assembly replied "Dieu le veult!" – "God wills it!"
