= Houdart =

Houdart is a surname. Notable people with the surname include:

- Emmanuelle Houdart (born 1967), Swiss artist and illustrator
- Fabrice Houdart (born 1978), French human rights advocate and academic
