= Book of Gomorrah =

Book of Gomorrah may refer to:

- The Book of Gomorrah is a book of ecclesiastical discipline written by Peter Damian in 1049.
- Gomorrah is a book by Roberto Saviano published in 2006.
