= 1061 papal election =

Election of Catholic Pope Alexander II

Papal election 1061

Dates and location
- 30 September 1061; San Pietro in Vincoli, Rome

Elected pope
- Anselmo de Baggio of Lucca; Name taken: Alexander II
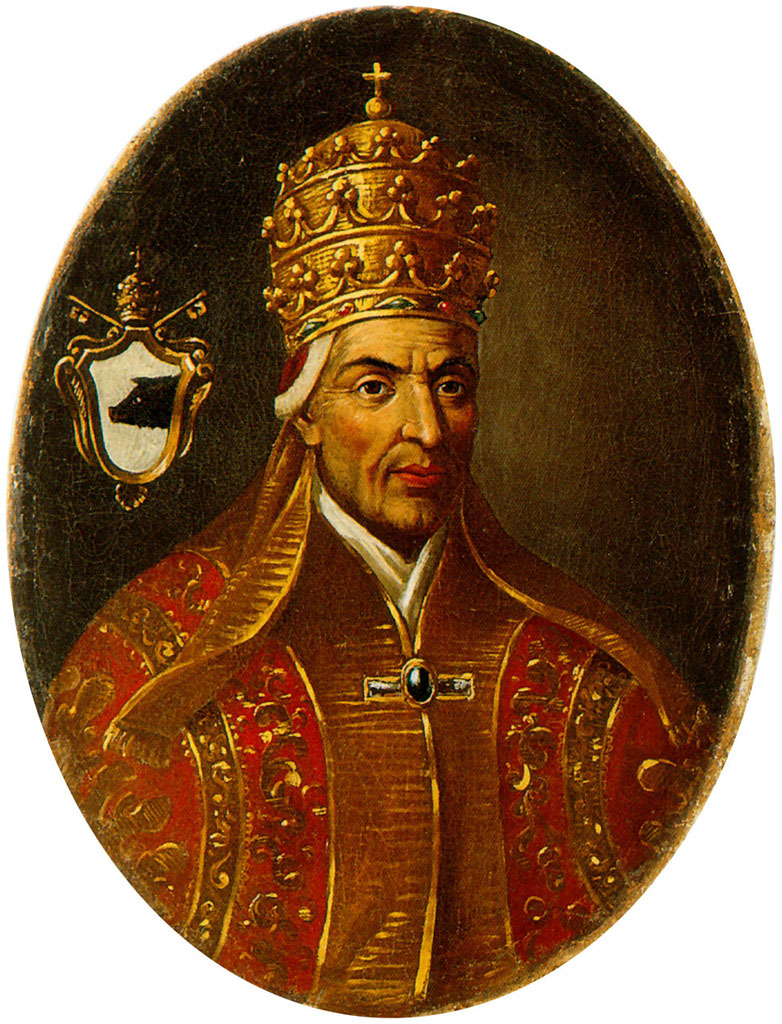

The 1061 papal election was held on 30 September 1061 in San Pietro in Vincoli ("Saint Peter in Chains") in Rome, following the death of Pope Nicholas II. In accordance with Nicholas II's bull, In Nomine Domini, the cardinal bishops were the sole electors of the pope for the first time in the history of the Roman Catholic Church. Bishop Anselmo de Baggio of Lucca, a non-cardinal and one of the founders of the Pataria, was elected Pope Alexander II and crowned at nightfall on 1 October 1061 in San Pietro in Vincoli Basilica because opposition to the election made a coronation in St. Peter's Basilica impossible.

== Description ==
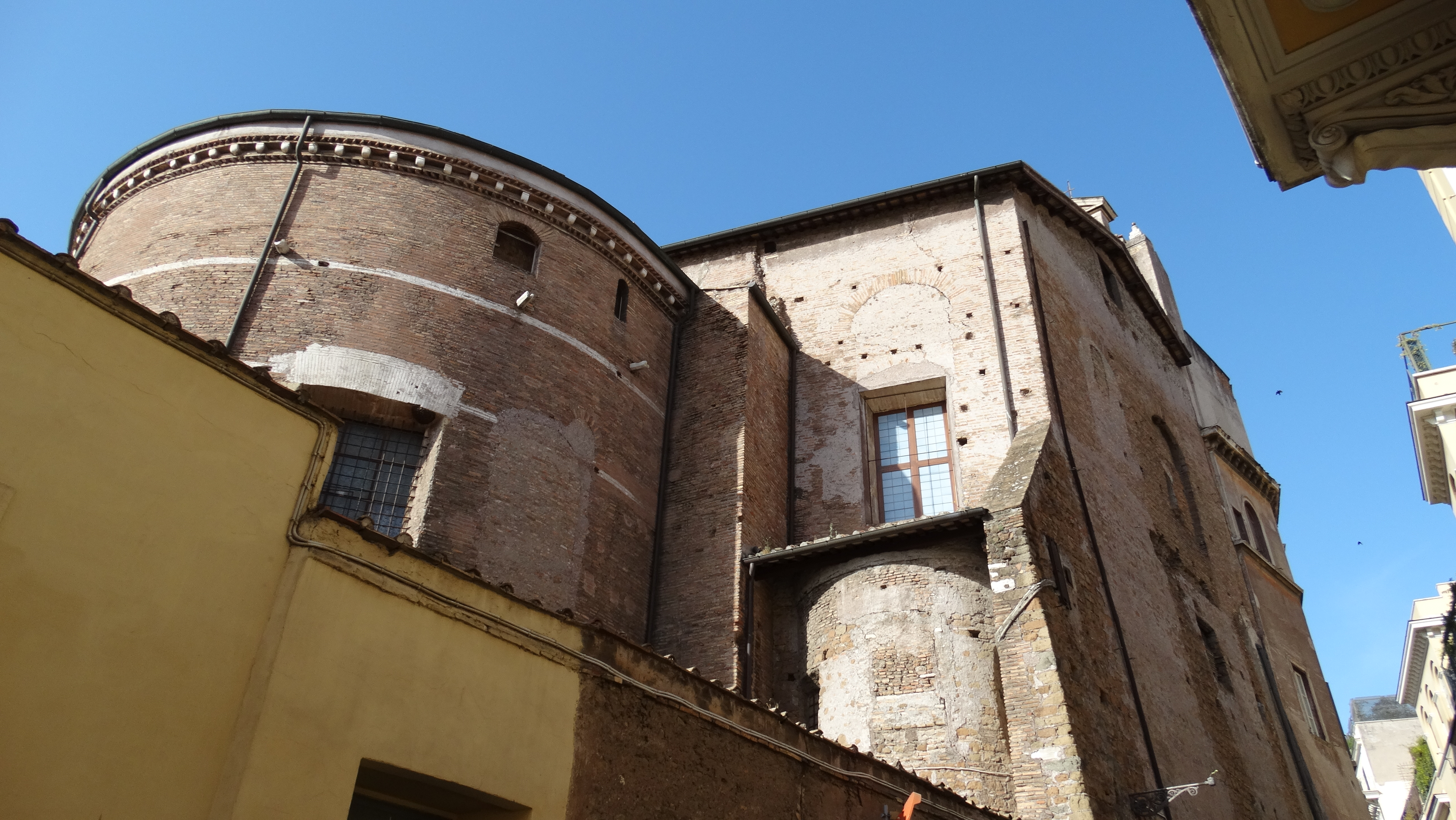
External brick walls of the apse of San Pietro in Vincoli. This is one of the oldest parts of the church and would have looked similar in the 11th century to how it looks today.

Anselmo had the support of his friend Cardinal Hildebrand, a driving force behind the promulgation of In Nomine Domini and the future Pope Gregory VII, Godfrey III, Duke of Lower Lorraine, and the Norman forces of Robert Guiscard, present at the election in fulfilment of a security guarantee Guiscard had made to Nicholas II when appointed Duke of Apulia and Calabria. Although Anselmo was well-known and respected within the German court, the assent of the Holy Roman Emperor to the election was not sought.

Displeased with the new process, a group of Roman nobles and Lombard bishops, led by Guibert, the royal chancellor of Italy, beseeched Agnes de Poitou, empress-regent of Henry IV, Holy Roman Emperor, to nominate Bishop Pietro Cadalo to succeed Nicholas II. Cadalo was elected Antipope Honorius II at a synod convoked at Basel on 28 October 1061, at which no cardinals were present.

Antipope Honorius II proceeded to march on Rome, defeating Alexander II and taking control of St. Peter's Basilica and its environs on 14 April 1062. The intervention of Godfrey III convinced Honorius II and Alexander II to retire to Parma and Lucca respectively, awaiting mediation between Godfrey III and the Imperial court. However, Anno II, Archbishop of Cologne had engineered a coup d'état against the empress regent. As regent, Anno convened the Council of Augsburg (October 1062) and sent Burchard II, Bishop of Halberstadt as an envoy to Rome. Burchard cleared Alexander II of charges of simony and recognized him as the new pontiff.

Alexander II excommunicated Honorius II in 1063, but after a counter-synod Honorius II was able to establish himself in Castel Sant'Angelo and wage war against Alexander II for another year before fleeing again to Parma. The Synod of Mantua (Pentecost, 31 May 1064) anathematized Cadalo and declared Alexander II the rightful pope.

== Cardinal electors ==
In 1061 there were six cardinal-bishops:

| Elector | Nationality | Order and title | Elevated | Elevator | Notes |
|---|---|---|---|---|---|
| Bonifazio, O.S.B. | Apulia | Cardinal-bishop of Albano | before 1054 | Leo IX | |
| Pietro | | Cardinal-bishop of Tusculum | before 1057 | Victor II | |
| Giovanni | | Cardinal-bishop of Porto | 1057 | Stephen IX | |
| Peter Damian, O.S.B.Cam. | Ravenna | Cardinal-bishop of Ostia | 30 November 1057 | Stephen IX | Future Doctor of the Church |
| Bernardo da Benevento, O.S.B.Cas. | Benevento | Cardinal-bishop of Palestrina | 1061 | Nicholas II | |
| Mainardo of Pomposa, O.S.B.Cas. | Italian | Cardinal-bishop of Silva Candida | May 1061 | Nicholas II | |
