= Liber Gratissimus =

Medieval theological text

The Liber Gratissimus (Most Gratuitous Book) is a treatise by Peter Damian on simony. Written in 1052, it has been described as "one of the finest theological works of the century."

== Background and publication history ==
Simony was extensively debated at the first synod of Pope Leo IX, with the pope contemplating annulling all ordinations that were a result of simony. At the urging of his contemporaries, Peter Damian wrote his first treatise on simony and sacramental theology in the summer of 1052. It was dedicated to Henry, the archbishop of Ravenna, about whom next to nothing is known. The title of the work, Liber Gratissimus or Most Gratuitous Book, "because it was written about those who had been ordained gratis by simonists", is given by Damian himself in one of his subsequent letters.

== Content ==
Peter Damian distinguishes between someone who is "institutionally" holy on the basis of his religious office and someone who is "personally" holy on the basis of his deeds. Echoing Augustine in his Commentary on John, he argues that although simony is a sin worse than adultery and murder, the religious acts of simoniacal bishops are still valid, since the validity of sacraments such as baptism and ordination does not come from the bishop, but from the Holy Spirit. He cites the example of Rainaldus, the simoniacal bishop of Fiesole through whom God nonetheless worked miracles. Damian also refers to the Church Fathers; Jerome, for instance, had claimed that "God's blessing is attached to the dignity of the office and not to the value of the man."

Damian also adopts a more liberal definition of simony in several chapters of the Liber Gratissimus. For example, he considers the money changers outside the Second Temple (as depicted in the "Cleansing of the Temple" gospel narrative) to be simoniacs, simply because they represent the "intrusion of worldly values into the affairs of the Church."

== Legacy ==
According to David Rollo, the Liber Gratissimus is one of the two works that Peter Damian is best known for (the other being the Liber Gomorrhianus). Colin Morris called the Liber Gratissimus "one of the finest theological works of the century."
