= Château de Chevron =

Castle in Mercury in the Savoie département of France

Coordinates: 45°40′31″N 6°20′14″E

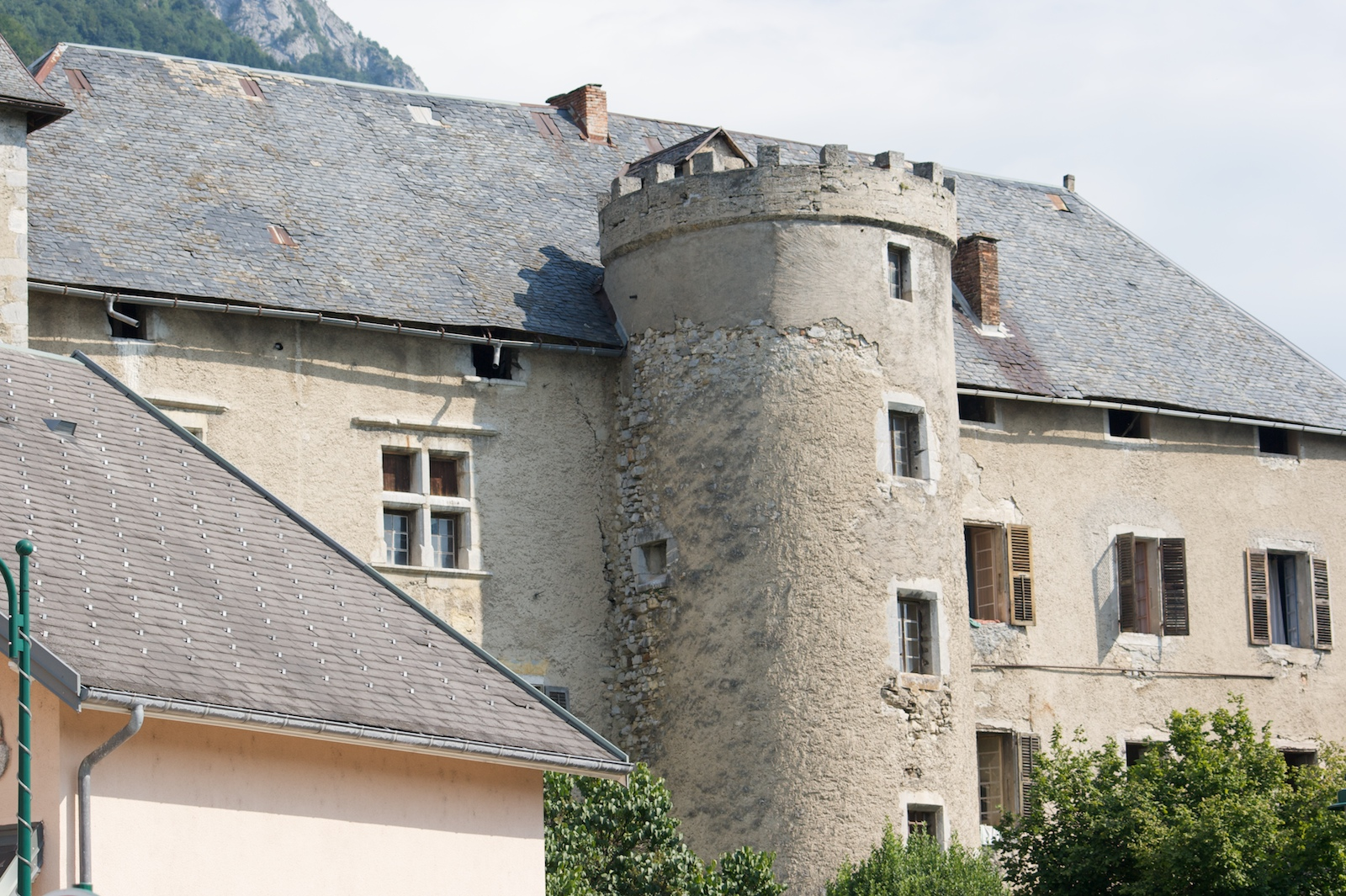
Château de Chevron

The Château de Chevron is a redesigned and remodelled castle in the commune of Mercury in the Savoie département of France. It was owned by the powerful Quilliard family.

== History ==
Pope Nicholas II was born in Chevron between 990 and 995.

For two years during the Second World War, the Quilliard family, owners of the château, hid a Jewish family of ten there. All survived. In 1996, the owners of the castle were given the title Righteous among the Nations by Yad Vashem and the state of Israel in recognition of their courage.

== Architecture ==
The castle was built in the 14th century and remodelled in the 17th century. It has been listed since 17 May 1982 as a monument historique by the French Ministry of Culture.

== See also ==
- List of castles in France
