= In nomine Domini =

1059 papal bull regarding papal election

In nomine Domini (Latin for In the name of the Lord) is a papal bull written by Pope Nicholas II. The bull was issued on 13 April 1059 (Note: XIIth Indiction.) and caused major reforms in the system of papal election, most notably establishing the cardinal-bishops as the sole electors of the pope, with the consent of minor clergy.

== Background ==
Until the publication of the bull, the election of the pope was often decided by a puppet electoral process. The Holy Roman Emperor often directly named a deceased pope's replacement, or the pontiff named his own successor. Such a nomination under the canon law was not a valid election and the legal electors would have to ratify the choice, though undoubtedly they would naturally be swayed by circumstances to give effect to the imperial preference. (Note: It was in this way that Emperor Otto III appointed Gregory V and Sylvester II pope.)

In the 1050s, Cardinal Hildebrand (the future Pope Gregory VII) began to challenge the Holy Roman Emperor's right of approbation. The predecessor of Nicholas II, Stephen IX, had been elected during a period of confusion following the death of Emperor Henry III and, twelve months later, the death of Pope Victor II, whom Henry III had installed as pope. Stephen IX's election had obtained the consent of the empress-regent, Agnes of Poitou, despite the omission of the traditional preliminaries and the waiting of the cardinals for the imperial nomination.

Soon after his appointment as pope in 1058, upon the death of Stephen IX, Nicholas II called a synod at Sutri, with imperial endorsement provided by presence of an imperial chancellor. The first task of the synod was to denounce and excommunicate the irregularly elected Antipope Benedict X, who was a puppet of the powerful Count of Tusculum and presently in Rome.

Accompanied by troops provided by the Duke of Lorraine, Godfrey the Bearded, Nicholas made his way to Rome, and Benedict fled. Nicholas was consecrated pope on 24 January 1059 with wide acceptance of the Roman people. (Note: Gurugé states that this willingness of the Roman people to accept Nicholas was not so much his personality but the "lavish largess" paid to them by his chief advisor, Hildebrand.) Keen to avoid future controversy in papal elections and to curb the outside influence exerted by non-ecclesiastical parties, in April 1059 he summoned a synod in Rome. In nomine Domini was the codification of the synod's resolutions.

== Contents ==
=== Rights of the Holy Roman Emperor ===
The bull curtailed the rights of the emperor in papal elections. Specifically the following was brought into the canon law:

- Implicitly, the right of approbation of the Roman Pontiff by the emperor was abolished. (Note: Although the bull does state that due regard is to be had for the right of confirmation or recognition conceded to King Henry, and the same deference is to be shown to his successors, who have been granted personally a like privilege.)
- The right of imperial confirmation of the pope was retained, but it became less powerful, being a mere personal privilege granted to the emperor by the Roman See and could be revoked at any time.

=== Church reform ===
Nicholas also introduced reforms to combat scandals within the church at the time, especially concerning the lives of priests and religious. The following prohibitions were published:

- Simoniacal ordinations were outlawed.
- Lay investiture was forbidden.
- Assistance at and celebration of the Mass by a priest living in notorious concubinage was prohibited.
- The rules governing the lives of canons and nuns proclaimed at the diet of Aix-la-Chapelle in 817 were rescinded. (Note: Weber states that this was "because they allowed private property and such abundant food that, as the bishops indignantly exclaimed, they were adapted to sailors and intemperate matrons rather than to clerics and nuns.")

=== Papal elections ===
The major part of the bull deals with papal elections. The procedure and rules can be summarised as follows:

- When a pope dies, the cardinal-bishops should confer among themselves as to a candidate.
- When a candidate has been deduced the cardinal-bishops and all other cardinals are to proceed to an election.
- The remainder of the clergy and laity retain the right of acclaiming their choice. (Note: Cardinales Episcopi, cum religiosis clericis, Catholicisque laicis, licet paucis, jus potestatis obtineant eligere Apostolicæ sedis pontificem, ubi cum rege congruentius judicaverunt.)
- A member of the Roman clergy is to be chosen, unless a qualified candidate cannot be found. In this case, an ecclesiastic from another diocese may be elected.
- The election must be held in Rome, unless outside influences would make this impossible. In this case, the election may take place elsewhere.
- If war or other circumstances prevent a papal enthronement or coronation of the elected candidate, the candidate will still enjoy full Apostolic authority.
- The right of imperial confirmation of the pope was retained, but it became less powerful.

== Aftermath and reception ==
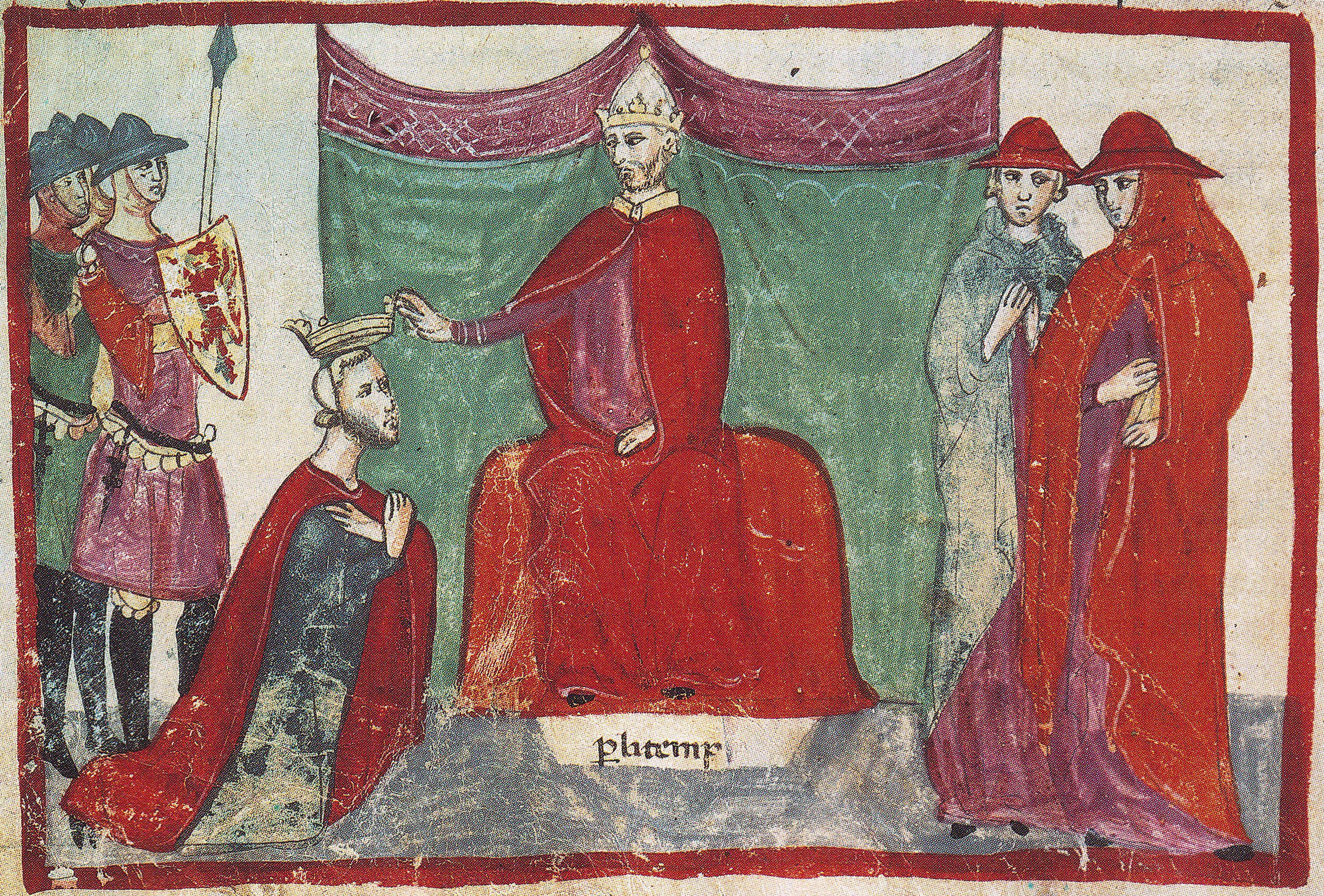
Robert Guiscard is proclaimed by Pope Nicholas II as a duke as the cardinal-bishops look on.

The bull was followed by an alliance between the papacy and Robert Guiscard, who was made Duke of Apulia and Calabria and Sicily by the Holy See in exchange for annual tribute and him guaranteeing the security of the See of Saint Peter. (Note: Guiscard had already conquered Apulia and Calabria upon the formation of the alliance, but would have to take Sicily from the Saracens.) Notwithstanding the bull, Nicolas II's successor, Alexander II, was consecrated without the approbation of the empress-regent, and was thus opposed by the imperial nominee Honorius II.

The electoral reforms of the bull were not received well in all quarters. The precedent that only cardinal-bishops could vote in elections was met with disdain by the minor Roman clergy. The cardinal-bishops, because of their offices, were "distinctly non-Roman," thus removing the control held by the Roman metropolitan church over the election of the pontiff. The bull was also a setback for the cardinal-priests and cardinal-deacons, from whom, in theory, the next pope had to be chosen before the bull was issued.

== Legacy ==
In nomine Domini was the first in a series of bulls which radically reformed the process of election to the Chair of Saint Peter. The bull did not, however, totally remove the influence of the imperial faction. Rather, the power of the Holy Roman Emperor was gradually eroded until he was deprived of his privilege of papal appointment at the Concordat of Worms in 1122.

The bull was also instrumental in the establishment of the College of Cardinals, which did not fully come into force until the election of Innocent II in 1130. For the first time cardinals were distinguished as a group set apart for the highest privileges of the church, including the election of the successor of Saint Peter.

== See also ==
- List of Latin phrases
- Papal conclave
- Papal selection before 1059
