= Peter Damian =

11th-century Benedictine monk

Saint Peter Damian OSB
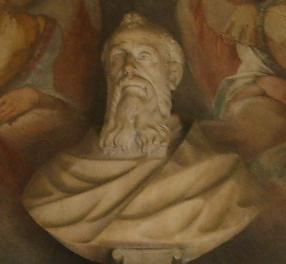
- Bust of Peter Damian. Santa Maria degli Angeli, Florence.

Bishop, Confessor and Doctor of the Church
- Born: c. 1007; Ravenna, Papal States
- Died: 22 February 1072 or 1073; Faenza, Papal States
- Venerated in: Catholic Church
- Feast: 21 February earlier 23 February (General Roman Calendar, 1823–1969)
- Attributes: represented as an Italian cardinal bearing a knotted rope in his hand; also as a pilgrim holding a papal Bull; Cardinal's hat, Benedictine monk's habit
- Patronage: Insomniacs, sufferers of disordered sleep

Peter Damian OSB (Latin: Petrus Damianus; Italian: Pietro or Pier Damiani; c. 1007 – 21 or 22 February 1072 or 1073) was an Italian reforming Benedictine monk and cardinal in the circle of Pope Leo IX. Dante placed him in one of the highest circles of Paradiso as a great predecessor of Francis of Assisi and he was declared a Doctor of the Church on 27 September 1828. His feast day is 21 February.

== Early life ==
Peter was born in Ravenna around 1007, the youngest of a large but poor noble family. Orphaned early, he was at first adopted by an elder brother who ill-treated and under-fed him while employing him as a swineherd. After some years, another brother, Damianus, who was archpriest at Ravenna, had pity on him and took him away to be educated. Adding his brother's name to his own, Peter made such rapid progress in his studies of theology and canon law, first at Ravenna, then at Faenza, and finally at the University of Parma, that, around the age of 25, he was already a famous teacher at Parma and Ravenna.

== Religious life ==
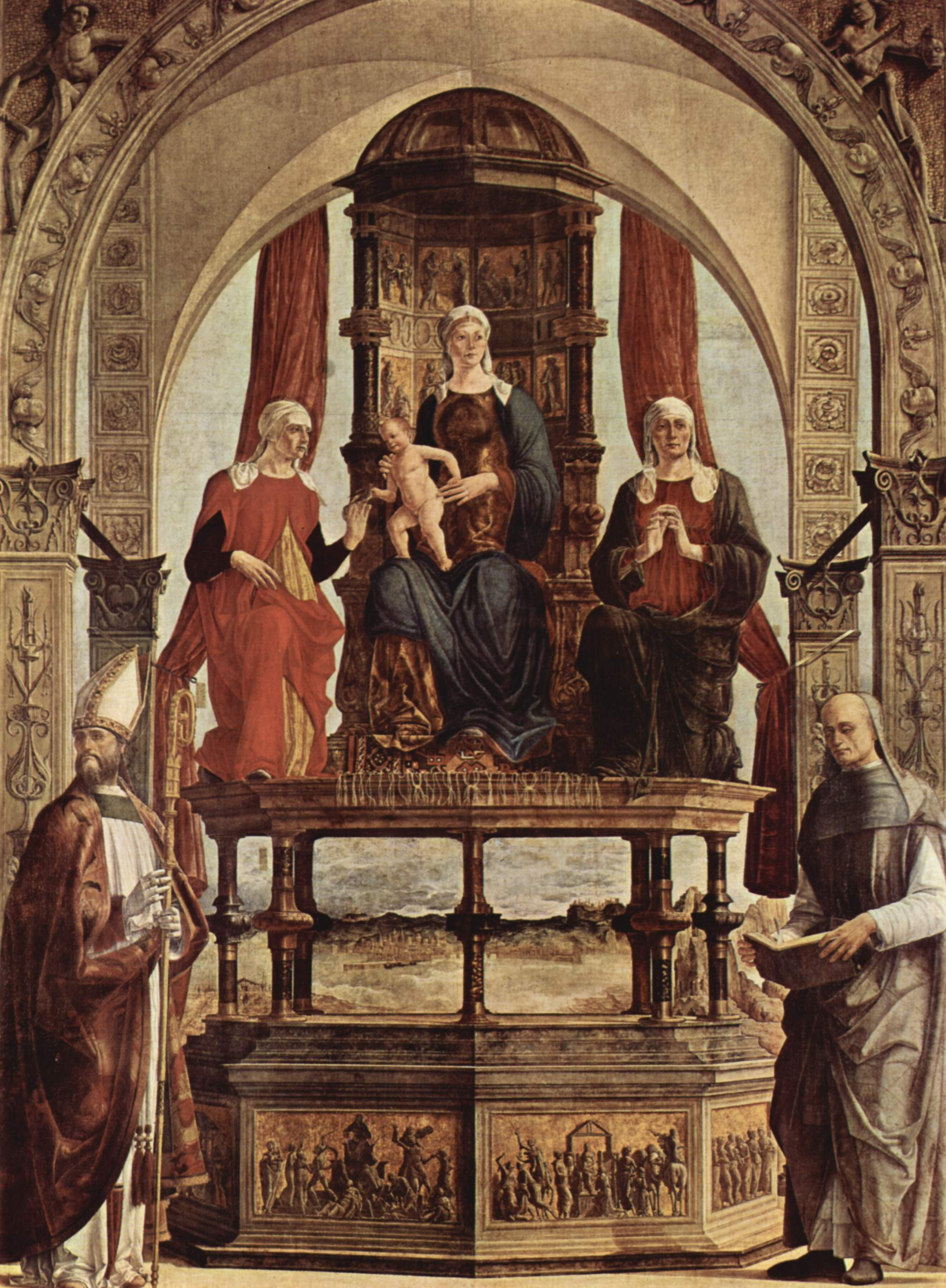
Peter Damian (far right), depicted with Augustine, Anne, and Elizabeth

About 1035, however, he gave up his secular calling and, avoiding the compromised luxury of Cluniac monasteries, entered the isolated hermitage of Fonte Avellana, near Gubbio. Both as a novice and as a monk, his fervour was remarkable but led him to such extremes of self-mortification in penance that his health was affected, and he developed severe insomnia.

On his recovery, he was appointed to lecture to his fellow monks. Then, at the request of Guy of Pomposa (Guido d'Arezzo) and other heads of neighbouring monasteries, for two or three years he lectured to their brethren also, and (about 1042) wrote the life of Romuald for the monks of Pietrapertosa. Soon after his return to Fonte Avellana, he was appointed economus (manager or housekeeper) of the house by the prior, who designated him as his successor. In 1043 he became prior of Fonte Avellana and remained so until his death in February 1072.

Subject-hermitages were founded at San Severino, Gamogna, Acerreta, Murciana, San Salvatore, Sitria and Ocri. A zealot for monastic and clerical reform, he introduced a more severe discipline, including the practice of flagellation ("the disciplina") into the house, which, under his rule, quickly attained celebrity, and became a model for other foundations, even the great abbey of Monte Cassino. There was much opposition outside his own circle to such extreme forms of penitence, but Peter's persistent advocacy ensured its acceptance, to such an extent that he was obliged later to moderate the imprudent zeal of some of his own hermits.

Another innovation was that of the daily siesta, to make up for the fatigue of the night office. During his tenure of the priorate, a cloister was built, silver chalices and a silver processional cross were purchased, and many books were added to the library.

== Reformer ==
Sancti Petri Damiani Opera Omnia (1743)

Although living in the seclusion of the cloister, Peter Damian closely watched the fortunes of the church, and like his friend Hildebrand, the future Pope Gregory VII, he strove for reforms in a deplorable time. After almost two centuries of political and social upheaval, doctrinal ignorance and petty venality among the clergy had reached intolerable levels. When the scandalous Benedict IX resigned the pontificate into the hands of the archpriest John Gratian (Gregory VI) in 1045, Peter hailed the change with joy and wrote to the new pope, urging him to deal with the scandals of the church in Italy, singling out the wicked bishops of Pesaro, of Città di Castello and of Fano.

Extending the area of his activities, he entered into communication with the Emperor Henry III. He was present in Rome when Clement II crowned Henry III and his consort Agnes, and he also attended a synod held at the Lateran in the first days of 1047, in which decrees were passed against simony.

After this, he returned to his hermitage. Damian published a constant stream of open letters on a variety of theological and disciplinary controversies. About 1050, he wrote Liber Gomorrhianus addressed to Pope Leo IX, containing a scathing indictment of the practice of simony, concubinage and sodomy, as threatening the integrity of the clergy. Meanwhile, the question arose as to the validity of the ordinations of simoniacal clerics. Peter Damian wrote (about 1053) a treatise, the Liber Gratissimus, in favour of their validity, a work which, though much combatted at the time, was potent in deciding the question in their favour before the end of the 12th century. Pope Benedict XVI described him as "one of the most significant figures of the 11th century, ... a lover of solitude and at the same time a fearless man of the Church, committed personally to the task of reform."

== Philosophy ==
Damian was not so much hostile to philosophy as insistent "that the liberal arts, including philosophy, must remain subservient to religion". He argued that monks should not have to study philosophy, because Jesus did not choose philosophers as disciples, and so philosophy is not necessary for salvation. But the idea (later attributed to Thomas Aquinas) that philosophy should serve theology as a servant serves her mistress originated with him. However, this apparent animosity may reflect his view that logic is only concerned with the validity of the argument, rather than the nature of reality. Similar views are found in Al-Ghazali and Wittgenstein.

Damian's tract De divina omnipotentia is frequently misunderstood. Damian's purpose is to defend the "doctrine of omnipotence", which he defines as the ability of God to do anything that is good, e.g., God cannot lie. Toivo J. Holopainen identifies De divina omnipotentia as "an interesting document related to the early developments of medieval discussion concerning modalities and divine omnipotence". Peter also recognized that God can act outside time, as Gregory of Rimini later argued.

== Papal envoy and cardinal ==
During his illness the pope died, and Frédéric, abbot of Monte Cassino, was elected pope as Stephen IX. In the autumn of 1057, Stephen IX determined to make Damian a cardinal. For a long time, Damian resisted the offer, for he was more at ease as an itinerant hermit-preacher than as a reformer from within the Curia, but was finally forced to accept, and was consecrated Cardinal Bishop of Ostia on 30 November 1057.

In addition, he was appointed administrator of the Diocese of Gubbio. The new cardinal was impressed with the great responsibilities of his office and wrote a stirring letter to his brother-cardinals, exhorting them to shine by their example before all. Four months later Pope Stephen died in Florence, and the church was once more distracted by schism. Peter was vigorous in his opposition to the antipope Benedict X, but the force was on the side of the intruder and Damian retired temporarily to Fonte Avallana.

== Milan ==
Around the end of 1059, Peter was sent as legate to Milan by Pope Nicholas II. So bad was the state of things at Milan, that benefices (a reward received in exchange for services rendered and as a retainer for future services) were openly bought and sold, and the clergy publicly married the women with whom they lived. The resistance of the clergy of Milan to the reform of Ariald the Deacon and Anselm of Lucca rendered a contest so bitter that an appeal was made to the Holy See.

Nicholas II sent Damian and the Bishop of Lucca as his legates. The party of the irregular clerics took alarm and raised the cry that Rome had no authority over Milan. Peter boldly confronted the rioters in the cathedral and proved to them the authority of the Holy See with such effect that all parties submitted to his decision.

He exacted first a solemn oath from the archbishop and all his clergy that for the future no preferment should be paid for; then, imposing a penance on all who had been guilty, he reinstated in their benefices all who undertook to live in celibacy. The prudent decision was attacked by some of the rigorists at Rome but was not reversed. Unfortunately, on the death of Nicholas II, the same disputes broke out, and they were not finally settled till after the martyrdom of Arialdo in 1066. Meanwhile, Peter was pleading in vain to be released from the cares of his office. Neither Nicholas II nor Hildebrand would consent to spare him.

== Later career ==
He rendered valuable assistance to Pope Alexander II in his struggle with the antipope, Honorius II. In July 1061 Pope Nicholas II died and once more a schism ensued. Peter Damian used all his powers to persuade the antipope Cadalous to withdraw but to no purpose. Finally Anno II, Archbishop of Cologne and acting regent in Germany, summoned a council at Augsburg at which a long argument by Peter Damian was read and greatly contributed to the decision in favour of Alexander II.

In 1063 the pope held a synod at Rome, at which Peter Damian was appointed legate to settle the dispute between the Abbey of Cluny and the Bishop of Mâcon. He proceeded to France, summoned a council at Chalon-sur-Saône, proved the justice of the contentions of Cluny, settled other questions at issue in the church of France, and returned in the autumn to Fonte Avellana.

While he was in France the antipope Cadalous had again become active in his attempts to gain Rome, and Peter Damian brought upon himself a sharp reproof from Alexander and Hildebrand for twice imprudently appealing to the royal power to judge the case anew. In 1067, the cardinal was sent to Florence to settle the dispute between the bishop and the monks of Vallombrosa, who accused the former of simony. His efforts, however, were not successful, largely because he misjudged the case and threw the weight of his authority on the side of the bishop. The matter was not settled until the following year by the pope in person.

Having served the papacy as legate to France and to Florence, he was allowed to resign his bishopric in 1067. After a period of retirement at Fonte Avellana, he proceeded in 1069 as papal legate to Germany and persuaded the emperor Henry IV to give up his intention of divorcing his wife Bertha. He accomplished this task at a council in Frankfurt before returning to Fonte-Avellana.

Early in 1072 or 1073, he was sent to Ravenna to reconcile its inhabitants to the Holy See, they having been excommunicated for supporting their archbishop in his adhesion to the schism of Cadalous. On his return thence he was seized with fever near Faenza. He lay ill for a week at the monastery of Santa Maria degl'Angeli, now Santa Maria Vecchia. On the night preceding the feast of the Chair of St. Peter at Antioch, he ordered the office of the feast to be recited and at the end of the Lauds he died. He was at once buried in the monastery church, lest others should claim his relics.

During his concluding years, he was not altogether in accord with the political ideas of Hildebrand. He died the year before Hildebrand became pope, as Gregory VII. "It removed from the scene the one man who could have restrained Gregory", Norman F. Cantor remarked (Civilization of the Middle Ages, p. 251).

== Veneration ==
Peter Damian is venerated as a saint with a feast day which is now celebrated on 21 February (Ordinary calendar). In 1970, his feast was moved there from its prior date of 23 February.

He was made a Doctor of the Church by Pope Leo XII in 1828.

His body has been moved six times. Since 1898, Peter Damian has rested in a chapel dedicated to the saint in the cathedral of Faenza. No formal canonization ever took place, but his cult has existed since his death at Faenza, at Fonte-Avellana, at Monte Cassino, and at Cluny.

The saint is represented in art as a cardinal bearing a knotted rope (the disciplina) in his hand; also sometimes he is depicted as a pilgrim holding a papal Bull, to signify his many legations.

Peter Daiman is venerated as the patron saint of those suffering from insomnia and other sleep disorders, having forgone sleep during periods of intense prayer during his life.

== Works ==
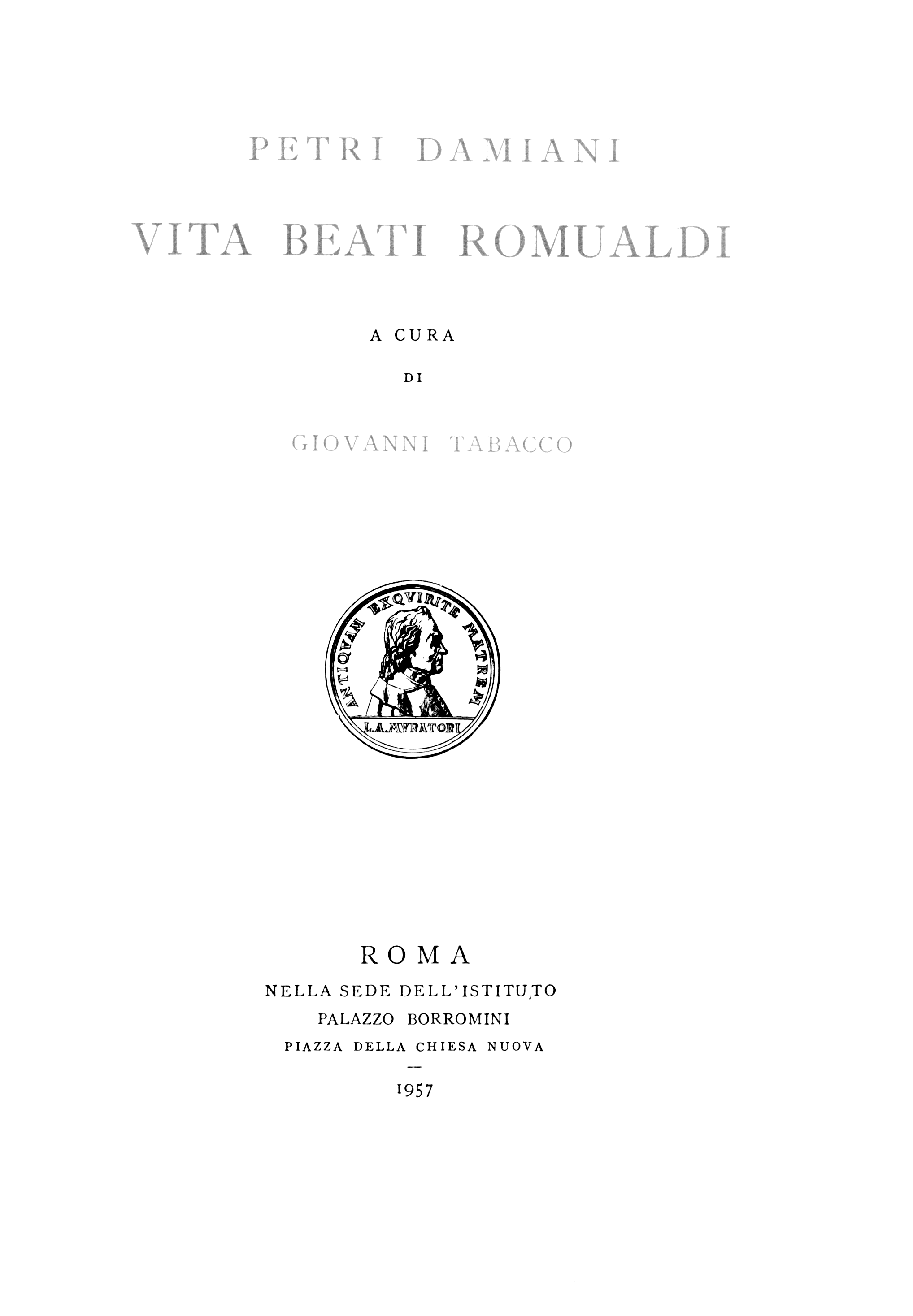
Vita Beati Romualdi (modern print edition)

Peter Damian's voluminous writings, including treatises (67 survive), letters, sermons, prayers, hymns and liturgical texts (though, in a departure from many early medieval monks, no biblical commentaries) reflect the spiritual conditions of Italy: the groundswell of intense personal piety that would overflow in the First Crusade at the end of the century, and his Latin abounds in denunciatory epithets.

His works include:

- His most famous work is De Divina Omnipotentia, a long letter in which he discusses God's power. The De Divina Omnipotentia purports to be a letter from Peter Damian to Desiderius, abbot of Monte Cassino. Peter develops a position he had taken in an earlier discussion with Desiderius on the claim of St. Jerome that, although God can do all things, he cannot restore virginity to a woman who had lost it. Desiderius had sided with Jerome; Damian had claimed that God could indeed restore lost virginity. In this letter, Peter defends his views, an undertaking that takes him into the discussion of the scope of divine power, the possibility of God's annulling the past, and the problems that arise from using the language of human temporality to describe divine possibilities in an eternal present. The central question of the nature and scope of divine power is related to previous discussions of the question and to the more sophisticated debates of the later Middle Ages. Damian's apparent claims that the law of contradiction does not apply to God and that God is able to annul the past deserve recognition. In these discussions, Damian shows himself the equal of any of the dialecticians that he so severely criticizes.
- In the short treatise Dominus vobiscum (The Book of "The Lord be with You") (PL 145:231-252), he questions whether a hermit praying in solitude should use the plural; Damian concludes that the hermit should use the plural since he is linked to the whole church by faith and fellowship.
- His Life of Romauld and his treatise The Eremitical Order demonstrate his continuing commitment to solitude and severe asceticism as the ultimate form of Christian life.
- He was especially devoted to the Virgin Mary, and wrote an Officium Beatae Virginis.
- Liber Gomorrhianus, the treaty about sodomy and insiders of the Catholic Church
- De Institutione monialis, which had the aim of safeguarding Western Christians from the decadent uses of the East. Notable in this work, among other things, Damiani, then Bishop of Ostia, condemned Maria Argyre's use of a golden fork to eat. Personal table forks were a new invention at the time.
- Disceptatio synodalis, in defense of Pope Alexander II against Antipope Honorius II
- De Sancta Simplicitate
- Liber Gratissimus, against simony

=== Modern editions ===
- Opera Omnia, in JP Migne, ed., Patrologia Latina, (PL), vols 144 and 145, Paris: Vives. [PL144 mostly contains his letters and sermons; PL145 contains his treatises]
- Pierre Damien: Lettre sur la Toute-Puissance divine, ed. Andre Cantin, SC 191 [a modern critical edition of this work]

=== Translations ===
- St Peter Damian: Selected Writings on the Spiritual Life, trans. Patricia McNulty (London, 1959).
- Damian, St Peter. The Book of Gomorrah: St Peter Damian's Struggle Against Ecclesiastical Corruption. Matthew Cullinan Hoffman (trans.). Ite ad Thomam. ISBN 978-0-9967042-1-2. Archived from the original on 29 December 2015.

== See also ==
- Anselm of Canterbury
- Saint Peter Damian, patron saint archive
