= Mercury, Savoie =

Mercury Stevron (Savoyard)
- Commune
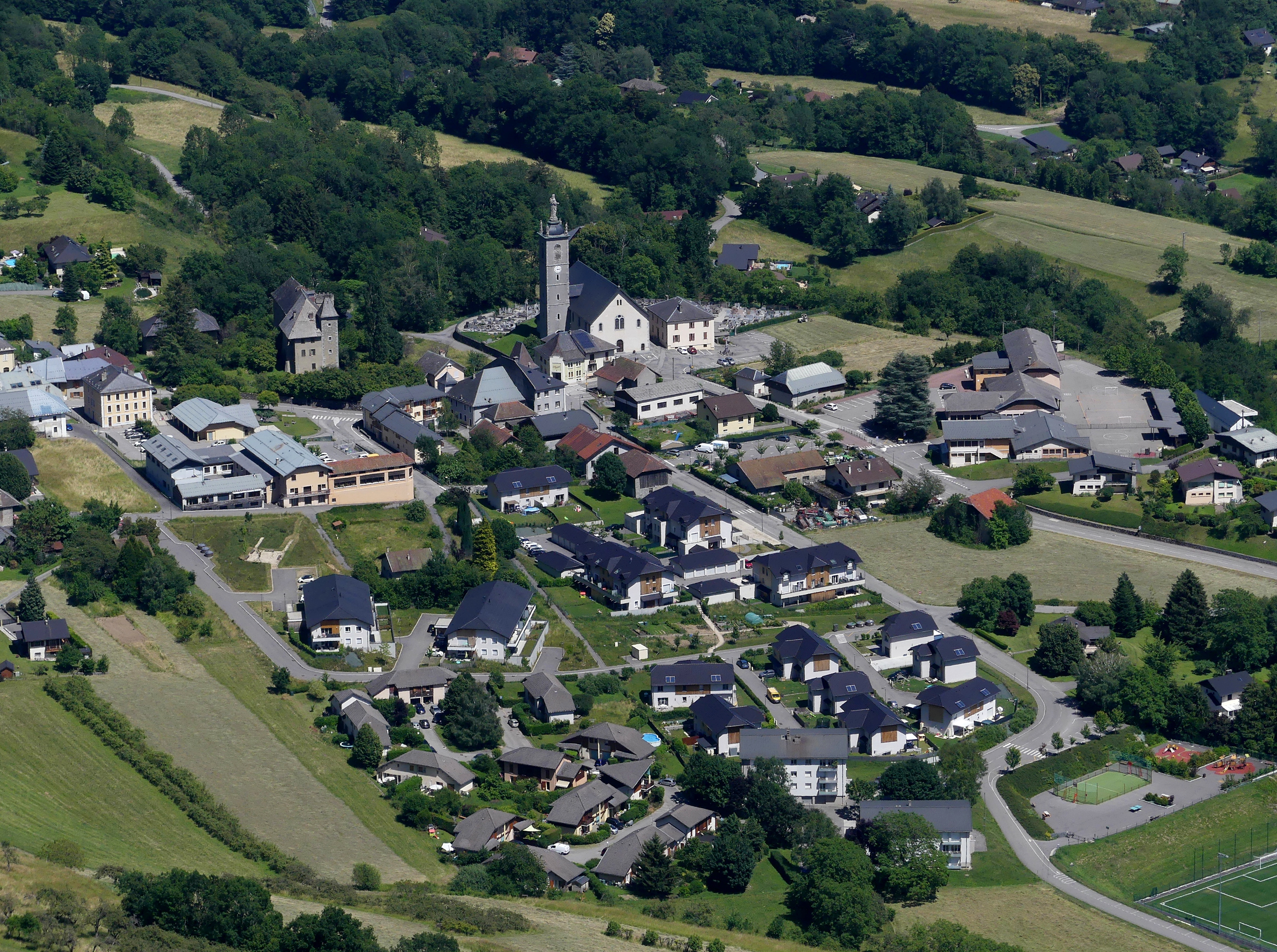
- The church and surrounding buildings in Mercury

- Coat of arms
- Location of Mercury
- Location within France Location within Auvergne-Rhône-Alpes
- Coordinates: 45°40′30″N 6°20′16″E
- Country: France
- Region: Auvergne-Rhône-Alpes
- Department: Savoie
- Arrondissement: Albertville
- Canton: Albertville-1
- Intercommunality: CA Arlysère

Government
  - Mayor (2020–2026): Alain Zoccolo
- Area^{1}: 22.33 km^{2} (8.62 sq mi)
- Highest elevation: 1,800 m (5,900 ft)
- Lowest elevation: 359 m (1,178 ft)
- Population (2023): 3,495
  - Density: 156.5/km^{2} (405.4/sq mi)
- Time zone: UTC+01:00 (CET)
  - Summer (DST): UTC+02:00 (CEST)
- INSEE/Postal code: 73154 /73200
- Website: www.mairie-mercury.com
- ^{1} French Land Register data, which excludes lakes, ponds, glaciers > 1 km^{2} (0.386 sq mi or 247 acres) and river estuaries.

Mercury (French pronunciation: [mɛʁkyʁi]; Savoyard: Stevron) is a commune close to Albertville in the Savoie département in the Auvergne-Rhône-Alpes region in south-eastern France. It is part of the urban area of Albertville.

== Population ==
Historical population
| Year | Pop. | ±% p.a. |
|---|---|---|
| 1968 | 1,370 | — |
| 1975 | 1,620 | +2.42% |
| 1982 | 2,037 | +3.33% |
| 1990 | 2,154 | +0.70% |
| 1999 | 2,330 | +0.88% |
| 2007 | 2,710 | +1.91% |
| 2012 | 2,940 | +1.64% |
| 2017 | 3,088 | +0.99% |
| 2023 | 3,495 | +2.08% |
Source: INSEE

The inhabitants are called Chevronnais in French.

== Sites and monuments ==
- Château de Chevron, a 14th-century castle remodelled in the 17th century. Pope Nicholas II was born in the castle.

== The Lost Boys of Mercury ==
Mercury, Savoie was home to a Catholic boarding school La Belle Étoile. A documentary aired in 2023 portrayed the abuse that 3 boys went through while attending the school.

== See also ==
- Communes of the Savoie department
