= Antipope Honorius II =

Italian bishop, antipope 1061–1064

- Appointed: 28 October 1061
- Papacy began: 28 October 1061
- Papacy ended: 1072
- Predecessor: Roman claimant: Nicholas II; Antipapal claimant: Benedict X
- Successor: Roman claimant: Gregory VII; Antipapal claimant: Clement III
- Opposed to: Pope Alexander II
- Other post: Bishop of Parma

Orders
- Ordination: 3 September 1030 (subdeacon); 31 July 1034 (deacon)

Personal details
- Born: Pietro Cadalo c. 1010 Verona
- Died: 1072 Parma

Honorius II (c. 1010 – 1072), born Pietro Cadalo (Latin Petrus Cadalus), was an antipope from 1061 to 1072. He was born in the County of Verona, and became bishop of Parma in 1045. He died at Parma in 1072.

== Biography ==
Cadalo was the son of the Lombard Ingone, the son of Wicard, the son of Atone. The family may have originated at Monselice (39 miles, 63 km east-southeast of Verona), and entered the military service of the Count of Verona. In 992, Wicard is on record as owning the castle of Calmano, when he acquired territory at Lonigo in the County of Verona. His son Ingone acquired a house and other property in Verona in 1005, and in 1014 he had risen to the post of Vicecomes (vice-count, viscount) of the city of Verona. Ingone was dead by 13 July 1028, on which date his sons and heirs, Cadalo, Erizo and Giovanni, purchased additional property. It is stated in the documents that Cadalo was already in the clerical state ("clericus").

=== Ecclesiastical career ===
By 3 September 1030, Cadalo had been ordained a subdeacon. He was a deacon by 31 July 1034. By 11 April 1041, he held the important post of vicedomino of the Church of Verona, administrator of the possessions of the diocese.

On 24 April 1046, Bishop Cadalo founded the monastery of S. Giorgio in Braida, on land which he had acquired the previous day in a transaction with Bishop Walter of Verona. Bishop Cadalo attended the diet held by the Emperor Henry III at Pavia in October 1046; even though he was accused of simony he signed the acts of the diet. On 1 May 1047, moreover, the Emperor granted the county of Parma to the Church of Parma and its bishop, Cadalo.

In 1048, Bishop Cadalo obtained from Marchese Boniface, the Lord of Tuscany, confirmation of the grant of the monastery of S. Bartolomeo in Pistoia to the monastery of S. Giovanni Battista in Parma.

In 1050, Bishop Cadalo attended the Roman synod of Pope Leo IX, which was held at the Lateran Basilica from 29 April to 2 May. On 1 May he subscribed Pope Leo's letter to Bishop John, approving his transfer by the pope and synod from the diocese of Tusculum to the diocese of Porto.

When the old bishop's house was destroyed by fire, Bishop Cadalo had a new episcopal palace built on a grander scale. It was in use by February 1055.

In the spring of 1055, Bishop Cadalo accompanied Emperor Henry III on his visit to Tuscany, where they met the newly consecrated Pope Victor II, an appointee of the Emperor. Conferences began on 27 May in Florence, and the Emperor and Pope held a joint synod in Florence on 4 June. On 6 June the Emperor issued a privilege in favor of the Canons of Parma.

Henry III died on 5 October 1056, leaving his crown to his ten-year-old son, Henry, under the regency of the Empress Agnes of Poitou. Victor II died on 28 July 1057.

The city of Parma was devastated by a major fire on 10 August 1058. The cathedral was so badly damaged that it could not be repaired, and Bishop Cadalo therefore broke ground for a new cathedral in a different place. The residences of the canons of the cathedral were also destroyed, and Cadalo built new ones next to the new cathedral. The building was finally consecrated by Pope Paschal II on 4 November 1106.

=== Pope ===
After the death of Pope Nicholas II (1059–1061) at Florence on 27 July 1061, two different groups initiated plans to choose a new pope. According to Cardinal Beno, the cardinals were aware of the ambitions of the Archdeacon Hildebrand, and immediately requested the Emperor Henry IV to name Bishop Cadalo of Parma as the new pope.

The reformist cardinals met under the direction of Hildebrand (who later became Pope Gregory VII), and sent a representative, the former monk of Cluny, Cardinal Stephen, to seek the permission of the emperor to conduct an election. After a five-day wait during which he was not received in audience, the Cardinal returned to Italy, without having received the congé d'élire. Three months after the death of Pope Nicholas, the reformists, who were still in Florence, then elected Pope Alexander II (1061–1073) on 30 September 1061. Alexander II (Anselm the Elder, Bishop of Lucca) had been one of the leaders of the reform party. He was able to enter Rome only through the violent support of Richard of Capua and his Norman soldiers.

==== Appointment to papacy ====
Twenty-eight days after Alexander II's election an assembly of German and Lombard bishops and notables opposed to the reform movement was brought together at Basel by the Empress Agnes as regent for her son, King Henry IV (1056–1105), and was presided over by the Imperial Chancellor Wibert. The council annulled the electoral decree of Nicholas II, and excommunicated Anselm of Lucca. It was argued in the ensuing pamphlet that a pope whose jurisdiction is universal should be elected not only by the Roman people but also by the Roman emperor. With the assent of the assembly, on 28 October 1061 Henry appointed the bishop of Parma, Cadalus, as pope. He had been principally recommended to the German court by Bishop Dionysius of Piacenza and Bishop Gregory of Vercelli. He assumed the name of Honorius II.

In 1061, after his return from Rome, Pope Honorius II celebrated a diocesan synod in Parma.

In the beginning of 1062, with the support of the Empress and the nobles, Honorius II and his forces marched towards Rome to claim the papal seat by force. Bishop Benzo of Alba helped his cause as imperial envoy to Rome. The army had advanced as far as Sutri by 25 March. On 14 April a brief but bloody conflict took place near Rome, just north of the Castel Sant'Angelo in the "prato Neronis" (prata S. Petri). The forces of Alexander II were defeated, and Honorius II took possession of the Leonine city and the precincts of St. Peter's Basilica. He did not enter the city of Rome, however, and did not hold his gains for long. A few days later, on the approach of the Duke of Lorraine, he withdrew to the fortress of Flajanum.

Honorius II was recognized as pope by the envoys of the eastern Emperor, Constantine X Doukas. They were in Italy to put together an alliance against the Normans and Alexander II, as part of the emperor's plan to reclaim Calabria for the empire. They had already been treating with the Romans and with the imperial legate Benizo, hoping to include the German emperor in the enterprise.

Duke Godfrey of Tuscany and Spoleto arrived at the Milvian Bridge, a few miles north of the north gate of Rome in May 1062, thereby frustrating the efforts of the imperial agents. He induced both rivals to submit the decision about their legitimacy to the King's decision. Honorius II withdrew to Parma and Alexander II returned to his see in Lucca, pending Godfrey's mediation with the German court and the advisers of the young German king, Henry IV.

==== Political change and attempted deposition ====
In Germany, meanwhile, a coup-d-état had taken place. Anno, the powerful Archbishop of Cologne, had seized the regency, and the Empress Agnes retired to the Abbey of Fruttuaria in Piedmont. The chief authority in Germany passed to Anno, who was hostile to Honorius II.

Having declared himself against Cadalus, the new regent summoned the bishops of Germany and Italy to the Council of Augsburg (Concilium Osboriense) (27 October 1062), and, in the presence of the young King Henry IV, declared Alexander to be the true pope and Cadalo a pretender. He secured the appointment of an envoy to be sent to Rome to investigate charges of simony against Alexander II. The envoy, who was Anno's nephew Burchard II, Bishop of Halberstadt, found no objection to Alexander II's election. With the political change, Alexander II came to be recognized as the lawful pontiff by the German court. Alexander held a synod in Rome in the spring of 1063, during the Easter season, and had his rival, Cadalo (Honorius II), accused of simony (an old charge, dating back to 1045, and ignored repeatedly by popes and synods), seeking the papacy, attacking Rome, and counselling homicide; he was excommunicated.

Honorius did not, however, abandon his claims. At a synod of his own, held at Parma shortly after Alexander's, he defied the excommunication, pointing out that he had been chosen by the German king acting as Roman patrician, while Alexander had been chosen neither by the clergy of Rome nor the Roman people, and had been intruded by the Normans, the enemies of the Roman people; Honorius levelled his own excommunication against Alexander. He gathered an armed force and once more proceeded to Rome, where he established himself in the Castel Sant'Angelo.

The ensuing war between the rival Popes lasted for about a year. After a siege of two months, Honorius II withdrew from Rome and returned to Parma. He continued to act as the pope, however, celebrating masses, conducting ordinations, and issuing bulls and apostolic letters.

==== Formal deposition resisted ====
The Council of Mantua, on Pentecost, 31 May 1064, ended the schism by formally declaring Alexander II to be the legitimate successor of St. Peter. Honorius II, however, maintained his claim to the papal chair to the day of his death. His successor, Evrardus (Heberardus) also rejected Gregory VII and maintained allegiance to Henry IV. He fought for Henry against Matilda of Tuscany, and joined the schism of Clement III (Bishop Wibert of Ravenna).

Cadalus died in Parma in 1072, still maintaining that he was pope, "Apostolicus electus". His death is registered by Bonizo of Sutri as occurring just before the death of the bishop of Ravenna, Giovanni Enrico, which took place in 1072. His epitaph is preserved by Ireneo Affò.

== See also ==
- Papal selection before 1059
