= Pope Alexander II =

Head of the Catholic Church from 1061 to 1073

- Bishop of Rome
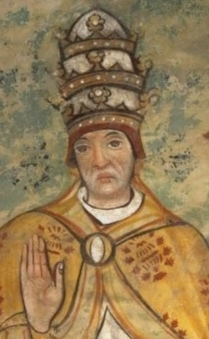
- Medieval depiction of Alexander II
- Church: Catholic Church
- Elected: 30 September 1061
- Papacy began: 1 October 1061
- Papacy ended: 21 April 1073
- Predecessor: Nicholas II
- Successor: Gregory VII
- Other post: Bishop of Lucca

Personal details
- Born: Anselmo da Baggio; 1010/1015 Milan, Holy Roman Empire
- Died: 21 April 1073 Rome, Papal State

Pope Alexander II (1010/1015 – 21 April 1073), born Anselm of Baggio, was the head of the Roman Catholic Church and ruler of the Papal States from 1061 to his death in 1073. Born in Milan, Anselm was deeply involved in the Pataria reform movement. Elected according to the terms of his predecessor's bull, In nomine Domini, Anselm's was the first election by the cardinals without the participation of the people and minor clergy of Rome. He also authorized the Norman conquest of England in 1066.

== Early life and work ==
Anselm was born in the parish of Cesano Boscone in the town of Corsico some 7 km (4.3 mi) from Milan of a noble family. The family took its name from Baggio, a suburb of Milan, where the family held the office of "captain". According to the Liber pontificalis, his father's name was Anselmus or Ardericus.

Contemporary sources do not provide any information on where Anselm might have obtained his education. It was traditionally believed that Anselm de Baggio studied under Lanfranc at Bec Abbey. However, modern historiography rejects the assertion. He became a member of the clergy of the Milan Cathedral, and was ordained a priest by Archbishop Wido of Milan.

He was one of the founders of the Pataria, a movement in the Archdiocese of Milan, aimed at reforming the clergy and ecclesiastic government in the province, and supportive of Papal sanctions against simony and clerical marriage. They contested the ancient rights of the cathedral clergy of Milan and supported the Gregorian reforms. Anselm was one of four "upright and honest" priests suggested to succeed Ariberto da Intimiano as prince bishop of Milan. When the Emperor Henry III chose instead the more worldly Guido da Velate, protests followed. In order to silence a vocal critic, Bishop Guido sent Anselm to the Imperial Court.

The emperor instead named Anselm Bishop of Lucca in 1056 or 1057. The earliest testimony of his activity as bishop is on 23 March 1057. On 20 August 1057, he was with the imperial court at Trebur, and on 27 December at Pöhlde. As bishop, he was an energetic associate of Hildebrand of Sovana in endeavouring to suppress simony and enforce clerical celibacy. So bad was the state of things at Milan, that benefices were openly bought and sold, and the clergy publicly married the women with whom they lived. With the increased prestige of his office, he reappeared twice in Milan as legate of the Holy See, in 1057 in the company of Hildebrand, and in 1059 with Peter Damian.

Bishop Anselm attended the Roman council of Pope Nicholas II in the first half of April 1059, and another synod of uncertain date. He was in Rome again in April 1060, for a synod in the Lateran palace, when he subscribed two papal bulls dated 14 April 1060.

== Election as pope ==
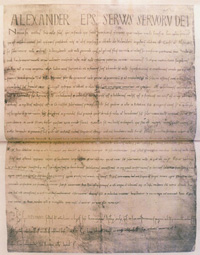
Bull of Alexander II

Pope Nicholas II died on 27 July 1061. The cardinals met, and sent a representative, the former monk of Cluny, Cardinal Stephen, to seek the permission of the imperial court to conduct an election. After a five-day wait during which he was not received in audience, the Cardinal returned to Italy, without having received the congé d'élire. The cardinal-bishops then proceeded to an election, having forced their way into the city of Rome with the aid of Prince Richard I of Capua and his Norman troops. On 1 October 1061, they chose Bishop Anselmo de Baggio of Lucca, one of the leaders of the reform party, who took the name Pope Alexander II.

Unlike previous papal elections, the assent of the Holy Roman emperor to the election was not sought. Cardinal-bishops were the sole electors of the pope for the first time in the history of the Church, in accordance with Nicholas II's bull, In Nomine Domini. The bull effectively removed the control held by the Roman metropolitan church over the election of the pontiff, unilaterally abrogating the rights of the emperor, the nobles of Rome, the clergy, and the people of Rome.

The new Pope Alexander II was crowned at nightfall on 1 October 1061 in the Basilica of San Pietro in Vincoli, because opposition to the election on the part of the Romans and German sympathizers made a coronation in St. Peter's Basilica impossible. The German court nominated another candidate, Cadalus, bishop of Parma, who was proclaimed Pope at a council held at Basel under the name of Honorius II. He marched to Rome and for a long time threatened his rival's position.

At length, after a palace coup which replaced Empress Agnes as regent with Archbishop Anno II of Cologne, Honorius was forsaken by the German court. He was deposed by a council held at Mantua on 31 May-1 June 1064. Honorius continued to challenge Alexander II's position until he died in 1072. The next sixty years exhibited one schism after another.

== Normans of Southern Italy ==
As early as 1063 the Normans, taking advantage of the schism, successfully expanded their empire by attacking and seizing the city of Gaeta, an important port leading into the southern part of the Roman campagna. In 1066, Richard of Capua, who had helped Alexander enter Rome and secure a coronation in October 1061, suddenly changed sides. With the Germans abandoning Cadalo and embracing Alexander, the Normans were no longer the mainstay and support of the papacy, and were faced with a competitor which had designs on the same territories as the Normans. The barons of the Roman campagna, too, saw an advantage to be gained (or at least revenge to be extracted) by joining the Normans against Alexander and the reform party of Hildebrand, which had robbed them of their rights in papal elections and the civil government of the Church. Moving north, Prince Richard seized Ceprano, devastated Lazio, and encamped outside Rome, from which he demanded the title of Patricius.

In the meantime, the frantic Cardinal Hildebrand repeatedly called upon Marquis Godfrey of Tuscany, who was with King Henry in Germany, to come to the aid of Rome. In spring 1067, he collected an army, lifted the siege of Rome, and caused Prince Richard to withdraw to Capua. Richard left his son Jordan in charge of the army in the plain below Aquino, to bar the way of the forces of Godfrey. However, it was a shortage of supplies, sickness, and bribery on the part of the Normans that brought Godfrey to negotiate with Jordanus and finally to return north. A new treaty between the papacy and the Normans was negotiated, and at the synod held at Melfi by Pope Alexander on 1 August 1067, Prince Richard returned to his allegiance and was confirmed as Duke of Apulia and Calabria.

== Policies ==
In the second half of April 1063, Pope Alexander held a synod at the Lateran Basilica in Rome, attended by more than a hundred bishops. During the synod, he excommunicated Honorius II (Bishop Cadalo). The pope and bishops also decreed: that no mercy was to be shown to simoniacs by preserving their dignity; that those who had been ordained by simoniacs were to be retained in their orders; in the case of a knowing consecration of a simoniac, both simoniac and consecrator were to be deprived of their offices; that a priest who has a wife or mistress should not say Mass; that no cleric should receive a church from a layman whether gratis or for pay; that no priest should hold two churches; that no one should be made a monk on the understanding that he would become abbot; and that a layman who becomes a cleric should change his costume.

In a letter of 15 May 1063, Pope Alexander ordered the archbishops of Reims, Sens, Tours, Bourges, and Bordeaux to obey his legate Cardinal Peter Damiani, Bishop of Ostia, "who is our own eye and the immoveable foundation of the apostolic see." He also forbade Gervase, Archbishop of Reims, from consecrating Jocelyn as bishop of Soissons, on the grounds that he was a simoniac.

On 6 May 1065, Pope Alexander held a council in Rome, attended by at least eight cardinals and forty-three bishops. It is known that the privileges of the monastery of Saint Denis in Paris were confirmed, and it was granted the privilege of being exempt from the jurisdiction of the bishop of Paris. In 1067, he made a tour of the southern cities of the Papal States and of the Kingdom of Naples, holding a synod in Melfi in October and then later in the year at Siponto. In this council held at Siponto, Pope Alexander deposed Bishop Lando of Nucerino, Landolf of Tortiboli, and Benedict of Biccari, all on accusations of simony.

=== Reforms ===
In an attempt to curtail simony (the buying and selling of sacred things or positions within the church), Alexander II sent out many legates and archbishops across Europe to enforce reform among local synods. Any clergy suspected of simony were then investigated. Any clergy who was invested in his office by a lay person were required to undergo a new investiture by a papal legate. A well-known victim of these campaigns included the bishop of Constance, who was removed from office for simony.

On 30 March 1068, Alexander held a synod in Rome, in which he absolved the bishop of Tortosa of a charge of homicide, but deposed the bishop of Florence on the grounds of simony; a charge of simony was laid against the bishop of Chiusi, who begged for absolution. The pope also ordered that churches not be held by lay persons and that ecclesiastical goods not be transmitted from parents to children as though they were subject to the laws of inheritance.

By 1071, the future Emperor Henry IV, though only 21 (and still only German King and Roman Patrician), was vigorously at work recovering the powers, privileges and properties which had been allowed to slip away from imperial control during his regencies. He crushed a riot in Saxony in 1069 and overcame the rebellion of the Saxon aristocrat Otto of Nordheim in 1071. But in 1071, Pope Alexander's reforming activities resulted in an open rupture with the King. Archbishop Guido of Milan recently died so Henry IV appointed Godfrey (Goffredo) de Castiglione as successor to Guido. However, Alexander II declared this investiture void, and appointed a Milanese priest named Attone (Atto), who had already been elected archbishop on 6 January 1072, in an electoral meeting sanctioned by Pope Alexander. In February 1072, he held a synod in Rome, in which he anathematized Goffredo, and confirmed Atto as archbishop. He wrote a letter to Henry IV, informing him of the papal actions. Henry IV sent five men to Rome to discuss the issue, but Alexander rejected and subsequently excommunicated them. This led to increased pressure between Henry IV and the popes.

On 1 October 1071, Pope Alexander consecrated the high altar of the new basilica dedicated to Saint Benedict at the monastery of Montecassino. He was assisted by Cardinal Hildebrand and other cardinals, by ten archbishops, and forty-four bishops, as well as abbots, clergy, nobles, and people. He had already, perhaps at the beginning of his reign, granted Abbot Desiderius personally the lordship over Terracina.

Pope Alexander also reformed the administration of the church of Santa Croce in Gerusalemme in Rome and of the Lateran Basilica, by replacing the monks of the Order of Montecassino with Canons Regular of the Congregation of S. Frediano of Lucca.

In liturgical matters, Alexander II ended the practice of singing or reciting the "Alleluia" during the Latin Church's observance of Lent. This reform was permanent.

=== Position on Jews ===
In 1065, Pope Alexander II wrote to Béranger, Viscount of Narbonne, and to Guifred, bishop of the city, praising them for having prevented the massacre of the Jews in their district, and reminding them that God does not approve of the shedding of innocent blood. On 11 June in that same year, he wrote a letter, admonishing Landulf VI of Benevento "that the conversion of Jews is not to be obtained by force." He was warm in his praise for Spanish bishops, who protected the Jews against those who came to Spain crusading against the Moors.

=== Crusade against the Moors ===
Also in the same year, Alexander called for the Crusade of Barbastro against the Moors in Spain. Alexander II issued orders to the Bishops of Narbonne, instructing crusaders en route "that you protect the Jews who live among you, so that they may not be killed by those who are setting out for Spain against the Saracens ... for the situation of the Jews is greatly different from that of the Saracens. One may justly fight against those [the Saracens] who persecute Christians and drive them from their towns and their own homes."

== England and William the Conqueror ==
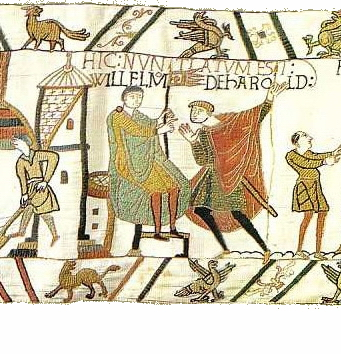
The Bayeux Tapestry: William the Conqueror holds a papal gonfalon with a golden cross, a gift from Pope Alexander II.

In 1066, Pope Alexander received an embassy from William, Duke of Normandy, after his successful invasion of Brittany. The embassy had been sent to obtain his blessing for William's prospective invasion of Anglo-Saxon England. Alexander gave it, along with a papal ring, a banner, and an edict to the autonomous Old English clergy guiding them to submit to the new regime. These favors were instrumental in the submission of the English church following the Battle of Hastings. Count Eustace carried his papal insignia, a gonfanon with three tails charged with a cross, which William of Poitiers said was given to William I to signify the pope's blessing of his invasion to secure submission to Rome.

William's successes in England brought the native English church into much greater control from Rome. William even agreed to Alexander's request to restore the payment of the Peter's Pence, which had lapsed in the time of Edward the Confessor. At the same time, William requested that the pope send him legates, to carry out a ceremonial crowning of the king. Alexander therefore sent Bishop Ermenfried of Sion (Sitten in Switzerland) and two "clerici cardinales" to England, who, at Eastertide 1070, presided at the coronation at Winchester.

The archbishop of Canterbury, Stigand, however, even though he made his peace with William, was a problem for Pope Alexander. Stigand had helped to drive the legitimate archbishop, Robert of Jumièges, from his see, and usurped the archbishopric for himself; he even dared to wear Archbishop Robert's pallium. Additionally, he continued to hold the diocese of Winchester, of which he was the legitimate incumbent, along with the archbishopric of Canterbury. Five successive popes, Leo, Victor, Stephanus, Nicholas, and Alexander himself, had sent legates to England, who excommunicated Stigand. Stigand was therefore not able to crown William king, as was the right of the archbishop of Canterbury. Nonetheless, Stigand and William remained on good terms, until, during a visit of William to the continent in 1067, the Normans in England behaved with particular brutality. Stigand switched sides, and with Edgar the Atheling fled to safety in the camp of refuge in Ely. They were besieged by the Conqueror, and Stigand was captured. Pope Alexander's legates, as instructed, demanded the deposition of Stigand, and at a general council held at Winchester after King William's coronation, the deposition was duly voted.

King William determined that he would not have his brother, Bishop Odo of Bayeux, as his new archbishop, nor would he promote his chaplain and chancellor, Herfast. He assembled a council of bishops, abbots and other notables, in order to discuss a suitable candidate for the vacant archbishopric. After this consultation, William offered the archbishopric to Lanfranc, the Abbot of the royal monastery of St. Stephen at Caen, to whom he had once offered the archbishopric of Rouen, which Lanfranc had refused. When Lanfranc also refused the see of Canterbury, the determined king sent his queen, Matilda, and his son Robert (a former pupil of Lanfranc), accompanied by a contingent of Norman nobles, to persuade him, to no avail. Abbot Herluin of Bec was called upon to exert his influence, again without result. William then ordered the papal legates to go to Normandy, and convene a council of bishops, abbots, and nobles, to prevail upon Lanfranc to accept the king's offer. Reluctantly, Lanfranc crossed to England, where he engaged in intense talks with William, who only persuaded him by invoking the recommendation which had been expressed by Pope Alexander. Lanfranc was finally elected by a council on 15 August 1070, the Feast of the Assumption, and consecrated on 29 August, the Feast of St. John the Baptist.

When Lanfranc wrote to Pope Alexander and to the Archdeacon Hildebrand that they defend him against the pretensions of the archbishop of York, and that they send him the pallium as his symbol of primacy, Hildebrand wrote a letter in reply, claiming that it was not the custom to send the pallium, but that the recipient come to Rome to have it bestowed; and besides, he and the pope wanted to confer personally with Lanfranc about pressing matters. In 1071, therefore, Lanfranc and Archbishop Thomas of York travelled to Rome to receive their pallia.

Subsequently, Pope Alexander wrote to Archbishop Lanfranc, ordering him to see to the state of the monastery of Winchester, and expressing annoyance that he had not yet procured the release of the bishop (Stigand), perhaps out of negligence, perhaps out of disobedience, perhaps fearing punishment by King William.

== Poland ==
In 1072 Alexander commanded the reluctant Canon of the cathedral of Kraków, Stanislaus of Szczepanów, who had been elected unanimously by the cathedral chapter, to accept appointment as the ninth Bishop of Kraków in succession to Bishop Lampert. Stanislaus became one of the earliest native Polish bishops. This turned out to be a significant decision for the Polish Church. Once appointed, Stanislaus was a highly assertive bishop who got into conflict with Polish king Bolesław II the Bold, pro suis actibus sceleratis ('because of his wicked deeds'). Bolesław and his nobles assassinated Bishop Stanislaus in the church of St. Michael in Rupella on 11 April 1079, and cut up his corpse into seventy-two pieces. Poland was laid under the interdict for four years, and the see of Kraków remained vacant. In 1088, the body of Bishop Stanislaus was transferred to his cathedral in Kraków, and eventually, he was venerated as a saint.

== Holy Roman Empire ==
In 1068, German King Henry IV attempted to divorce Bertha of Savoy. The Papal legate Peter Damian hinted that any further attempt at a divorce would lead the Pope to refuse to perform his coronation. Henry obeyed, and his wife, who had retired to Lorsch Abbey returned to Court.

A series of disputes broke out between the bishop Gerhard (Iaromirus, Jaromi) of Prague and the bishop John (Brewnow) of Olmouc in Bohemia. Duke Vratislaus II of Bohemia drew this to the attention of Pope Alexander II when he happened to be at the papal court in 1073. Alexander sent nuntii to Prague to sort the matter out, but they were captured, mutilated, and then murdered. Shocked at the enormity of the offence, Pope Alexander sent Cardinal Rudolph to Prague. When Gerhard refused to cooperate with the cardinal, he was deposed and Prague was laid under the interdict; when the situation quieted down, he restored the bishop and lifted the interdict, but ordered both bishops to present themselves before the papal court. When they appeared, Pope Alexander confirmed the deposition of the bishop of Prague, though he restored him once again at the pleading of Countess Mathilda of Tuscany.

== Death ==
Pope Alexander II died at the Lateran Palace on 21 April 1073, and was buried in the Lateran Basilica.

== See also ==
- List of Catholic saints
- List of papal conclaves
- List of popes

== Bibliography ==
- Agnelli, C.M. (1986). "L'episcopato lucchese di Anselmo I da Baggio: l'amministrazione delle finanze e del patrimonio della Chiesa." Actum Luce. Rivista di Studi Lucchesi 15, 1986, pp. 95–117. (in Italian)
- Artaud de Montor, Alexis (1910). The Lives and Times of the Popes. Vol. III. New York: Catholic publication society of America. pp. 25–30.
- Cabrol, Fernand (2003). Liturgical Prayer: Its History and Spirit. p. 46. (reprint of: Burns, Oates and Washbourne, Limited, 1925)
- Giuseppe Cappelletti (1859). Le chiese d'Italia: dalla loro origine sino ai nostri giorni (in Italian). Vol. 15. Venice: G. Antonelli. pp. 511–513.
- Cushing, Kathleen G. (1992). Anselm of Lucca, Reform and the Canon Law, C.1046–1086: The Beginnings of Systematization. University of Oxford, 1992.
- Gregorovius, Ferdinand (1896). History of the City of Rome in the Middle Ages. Vol. IV, Part I. London: G. Bell & sons.
- Mann, Horace Kinder (1910). The Lives of the Popes in the Early Middle Ages. Vol. VI: 1049—1073. London: Kegan Paul, Trench, Trübner. pp. 261–369.
- Morton, C. (1975). "Pope Alexander II and the Norman Conquest." Latomus 34, 1975, pp. 362–382.
- Schwartz, Gerhard (1907). Die Besetzung der Bistümer Reichsitaliens unter den sächsischen und salischen Kaisern: mit den Listen der Bischöfe, 951–1122. (in German). Leipzig: B.G. Teubner. pp. 212–213.
- Simonsohn, Shlomo. The Apostolic See and the Jews, Documents: 492–1404.
- Vaughn, Sally N. (1987). Anselm of Bec and Robert of Meulan: The Innocence of the Dove and the Wisdom of the Serpent. Oakland, CA: University of California Press.
- Watterich, I. M. (1862). Pontificum Romanorum qui fuerunt inde ab exeunte saeculo IX usque ad finem saeculi XIII vitae (in Latin). Vol. Tom. I. Leipzig: Engelmann. pp. 235–290. [sources]

Catholic Church titles
Preceded by Nicholas II	Pope; 1061–73	Succeeded by Gregory VII
