= Emmanuelle Houdart =

Swiss artist and illustrator (born 1967)

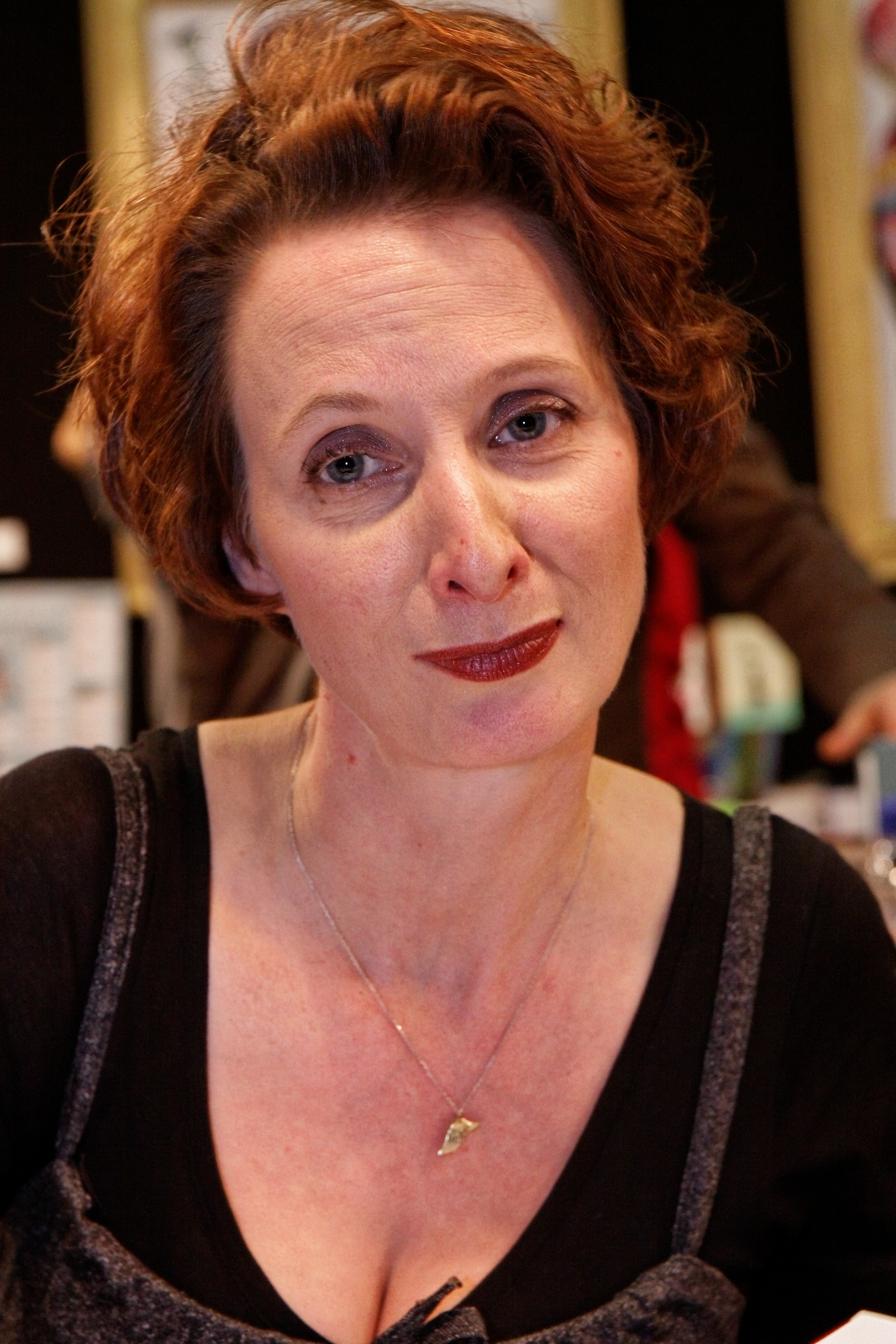
- Houdart in 2011
- Born: 30 September 1967 (age 57); Switzerland
- Occupation(s): Artist, illustrator, textile designer
- Website: http://emmanuellehoudart.fr/

Emmanuelle Houdart (born 1967) is a Swiss artist and illustrator.

== Biography ==
After studying at the Ecole des Beaux-Arts in Sion and graduating from the Ecole Supèrieure d'Arts Visuels in Geneve, Emmanuelle Houdart moved to Paris.

Since 1996, she has been working as a painter and illustrator, and recently also as a costume and textile designer. Her illustrations were turned into fabrics and costumes for the "Barnhominum" exhibition at the Salon du livre et de la presse jeunesse, Montreuil, 2011.

She contributes to many French magazines and newspapers such as Libération, Le Monde, Sciences et Vie Junior, Ça m'intéresse...

== Books ==
=== Author ===
- Les Trois Géants. Paris: Didier Jeunesse, 2000
- J’y arrive pas. Paris: Seuil, 2001
- Que fais-tu Fantine? : un livre de devinettes. Paris: Seuil, 2002
- Monstres malades. Paris: Thierry Magnier, 2004
- Les Voyages merveilleux de Lilou la fée. Paris: Actes Sud junior, 2006
- L’Abécédaire de la colère. Paris: Thierry Magnier, 2008
- La garde-robe. Paris: Thierry Magnier, 2010
- Tout va bien Merlin, Paris: Thierry Magnier, 2009
- Abris, Mountreuil: Les Fourmis Rouges, 2014

=== Illustrator ===
- Moi j’irai dans la lune : et autres innocentines. Paris: Grasset jeunesse, 1998. Text by René de Obaldia
- Le Fils de la sorcière et du loup. Paris: Grasset jeunesse, 1999. Text by Chris Donner
- Dico des monstres. Paris: Hachette jeunesse, 1999. Text by Élisabeth Brami
- Contes et légendes de la peur. Paris: Nathan jeunesse, 2000. Text by Gudule
- Poèmes à dire et à manger. Paris: Seuil jeunesse, 2002. Edited by Élisabeth Brami
- Attention sortie d’école. Paris: Thierry Magnier, 2002. Text by Bertrand Legendre
- Les Choses que je sais. Paris: Seuil jeunesse, 2003. Text by Laëtitia Bourget
- Poèmes à lire et à rêver. Paris: Seuil jeunesse, 2003. Edited by Élisabeth Brami
- Poèmes à rire et à jouer Paris: Seuil jeunesse, 2004. Edited by Élisabeth Brami
- L’Apprentissage amoureux. Paris: Seuil jeunesse, 2005. Text by Laëtitia Bourget
- Poèmes à vivre et à aimer. Paris: Seuil jeunesse, 2005. Edited by Élisabeth Brami
- Le Château des enfants gris. Paris: Nathan jeunesse, 2005. Text by Christian Grenier
- Dedans. Paris: Thierry Magnier, 2006. Text by Fani Marceau
- Emilie Pastèque. Paris: Thierry Magnier, 2007. Text by Ludovic Flamant
- Les Heureux Parents. Paris: Thierry Magnier, 2009. Text by Laëtitia Bourget
- Saltimbanques. Paris: Thierry Magnier, 2011. Text by Marie Desplechin
- Une amie pour la vie. Paris: Thierry Magnier, 2012
- L’argent. Paris: Thierry Magnier, 2013. Text by Marie Desplechin
- Ma mère. Paris: Thierry Magnier, 2015. Text by Stéphan Servant

== Grants and awards ==
- 2003: Prix Octogone, category Prix Graphique (CIELJ), for Les Choses que je sais
- 2003: Grant by the Centre national du livre for Monstres malades
- 2005: Bologna Ragazzi Award at the Bologna Children's Book Fair for Monstres malades
- 2006: Grand Prix SGDL du Livre Jeunesse for Les Voyages merveilleux de Lilou la fée
- 2007: Grant by the Centre national du livre for L'Abécédaire de la colère
- 2012: Grant by the Centre national du livre for L'Argent
