= Liber Gomorrhianus =

Eleventh-century book urging clerical reform

The Liber Gomorrhianus ('Book of Gomorrah') is a book authored and published by the Benedictine monk Peter Damian during the Gregorian Reformation circa AD 1051. It is a treatise regarding various vices of the clergy, and the consequent need for reform.

== Against simony and clerical concubinage ==
Damian wrote on a number of theological and disciplinary issues. He was a determined foe of simony, which some medieval ecclesiastical authors denounced as the most abominable of crimes. He strongly condemned the purchase of ecclesiastical offices by clergy, but, however, defended the validity of the sacraments that such clerics administered. In June AD 1055, during the pontificate of Pope Victor II, Damian attended a synod at Florence, Italy where simony and clerical incontinence were once more condemned.

== Against various sexual sins ==
In the second century AD, Tertullian wrote that “all other frenzies of lusts which exceed the laws of nature and are impious toward both bodies and the sexes we banish … from all shelter of the Church”. Early medieval penitential books contained a wide array of different penances for such trespasses. Although various forms of same-sex behaviour were discussed in contemporary handbooks of penance, such as those by Burchard of Worms and Regino of Prüm, according to Paul Halsall, this is the only theological tract which exclusively addresses this theme.

Bishops and priests were involved in every kind of immorality, publicly living with concubines or illicit wives, or furtively engaging in homosexual practices, following an example set by the scandalous Pope Benedict IX. "For Damian, the issue of homosexuality within the clergy is deeply related to the dignity of the priesthood." Damian believed that the profligate and licentious behaviour of the clergy undermined ecclesiastical authority and was beginning to provoke outbursts of violence from an outraged laity, which threatened civil order.

For Damian, one who practices homosexual sodomy suffers from fundamental disorientation regarding the natural complementarity of the sexes. "What do you seek in a man, that you are unable to find in yourself..." He railed against such practices of solitary masturbation, mutual masturbation, copulation between the thighs, and anal copulation, as subversive disruptions against the moral order occasioned by the madness associated with an excess of lust. He viewed such actions as progressively more unnatural in that they involved another person in shameful acts.

He was especially indignant about priests having sexual relationships with adolescent boys. He singles out superiors who, due to excessive and misplaced piety, have been lax in their duty to uphold church discipline. He opposes the ordination of those who engage in homosexual sex and wants those already ordained dismissed from Holy Orders. Those who misuse the sacraments to defile boys are treated with particular contempt.

== Controversy ==
Pope Leo IX praised Damian's motivation in advocating chastity and condemning vice and told him that Damian's own exemplary life did more to teach appropriate conduct than any words. He softened the suggestions for decisive action against offending clerics made by the author and excluded from the ranks of clergy only those who had offended repeatedly and over a long period of time. However, this interpretation is open to dispute as Leo also directed that the penitential be revised to reflect a stricter treatment.

== Sources ==
- The Latin text is found in Migne's Patrologia Latina, Vol. 145, cols. 159–190 (Google Books).
- Damian, St. Peter (October 2015). The Book of Gomorrah: St. Peter Damian's Struggle Against Ecclesiastical Corruption. Matthew Cullinan Hoffman (trans.). Ite ad Thomam. ISBN 978-0-9967042-1-2. Archived from the original on 2015-12-29.
- Pierre J. Payer (ed.): Book of Gomorrah: An eleventh-century treatise against clerical homosexual practise, Waterloo, Ont., 1982. Wilfrid Laurier University Press. (Includes the response of the Pope.)
- Owen J. Blum, O.F.M.: Peter Damian, Letters 31-60, part of the Fathers of the Church - Medieval Continuation series issued by the Catholic University of America Press, Washington, D.C., 1990.
