= Pope Nicholas II =

Head of the Catholic Church from 1059 to 1061

- Bishop of Rome
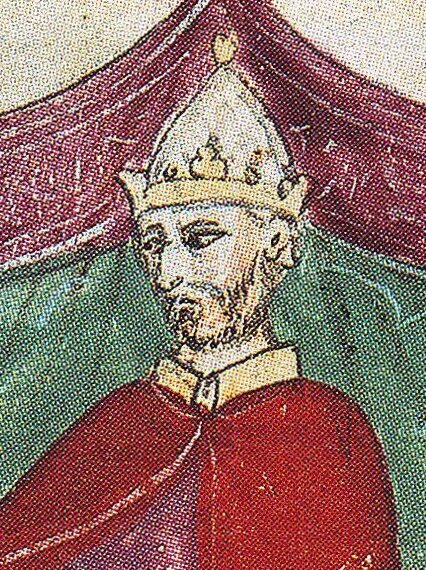
- Portrait of Nicholas II in the Nuova Cronica des Giovanni Villani
- Church: Catholic Church
- Papacy began: 24 January 1059
- Papacy ended: 27 July 1061
- Predecessor: Stephen IX
- Successor: Alexander II

Personal details
- Born: Gerard between 990 and 995 Château de Chevron, Mercury, Kingdom of Burgundy, Holy Roman Empire
- Died: 27 July 1061 Florence, March of Tuscany, Holy Roman Empire

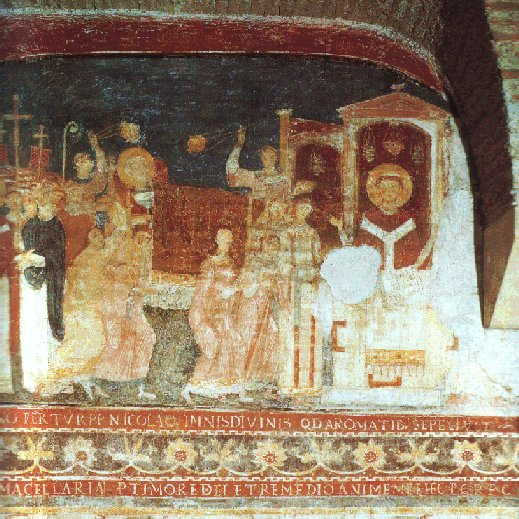
Nicholas II (right) depicted in a fresco in the Basilica of San Clemente al Laterano in Rome c. 12th century

Pope Nicholas II (Latin: Nicolaus II; c. 990/995 – 27 July 1061), otherwise known as Gerard of Burgundy, was head of the Catholic Church and ruler of the Papal States from 24 January 1059 until his death in 27 July 1061. At the time of his election, he was bishop of Florence. During his Papacy, Nicholas II successfully expanded the influence of the papacy in Milan and southern Italy. He was also responsible for passing papal election reforms, the most significant of which restricted the deliberation of candidates to the Cardinal Bishops, thus beginning the process of removing the lesser clergy, religious and nobility of the City from the process.

== Early life ==
Gerard of Burgundy was born in Chevron, in what is now Savoy. He was a canon at Liège. In 1045 he became bishop of Florence, where he restored the canonical life among the clergy of numerous churches.

== Papacy ==
Following the death of Pope Stephen IX, the count of Tusculum and his supporters took control of Rome and elected John Mincius, Bishop of Tusculum as Benedict X, in violation of the decree of Pope Stephen IX, that the election of his successor be delayed until the Archdeacon St. Hildebrand returned. Hildebrand, archdeacon of the Roman church, was away on a diplomatic mission to Germany. When he heard of Benedict X's election, he opposed it, along with the Cardinals Umberto di Silva Candida and Peter Damian, who then proceeded in May of the same year, to elect Gerard of Burgundy instead. In December 1058, with consent of the Queen Regent of Germany, the cardinals, clergy and laity who had opposed Benedict X's election met again at Siena and re-elected Gerard. He then took the name Nicholas II.

Nicholas II proceeded towards Rome, along the way holding a synod at Sutri, where, in the presence of the Tuscan ruler Godfrey the Bearded and the imperial chancellor, Guibert of Parma, he pronounced Benedict X deposed and excommunicated. The supporters of Nicholas II then gained control of Rome and forced Benedict X to flee to Gerard of Galeria. Having arrived in Rome, Nicholas II then proceeded to wage war against Benedict X and his supporters with Norman assistance. At an initial battle in Campagna in early 1059, Nicholas II was not wholly successful. But later that same year, his forces conquered Praeneste, Tusculum, and Numentanum, and in the autumn took Galeria, forcing Benedict X to surrender and renounce the papacy.

Nicholas II died on 27 July 1061, less than three years after becoming Pope.

=== Relationship with the Normans ===
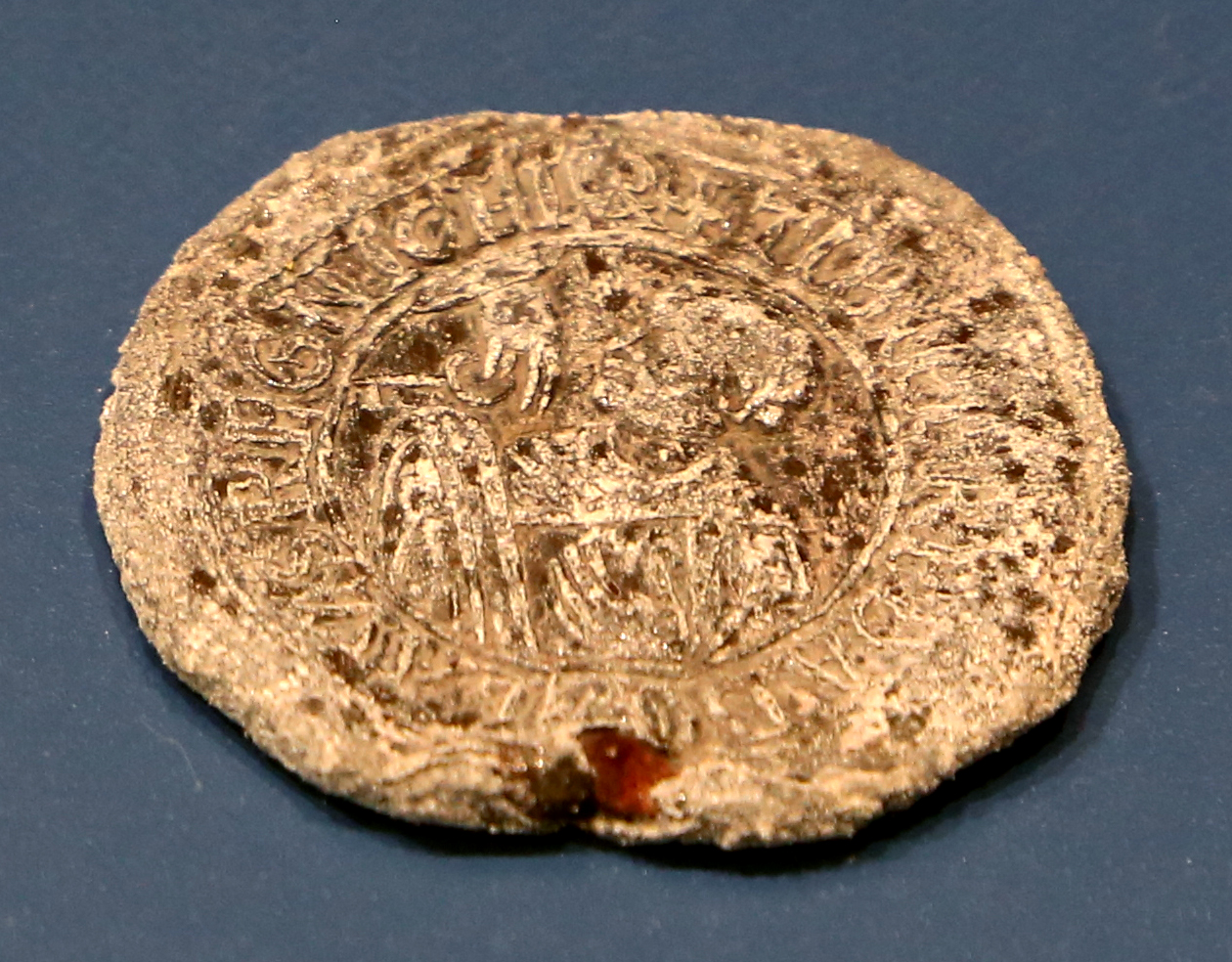
A 1059 bullae seal of Nicholas II

To secure his position, Nicholas II at once entered into relations with the Normans. The pope wanted to re-take Sicily for Christianity, and he saw the Normans as the perfect force to crush the Muslims. The Normans were by this time firmly established in southern Italy, and later in the year 1059 the new alliance was cemented at Melfi, where the pope, accompanied by Hildebrand, Cardinal Humbert, and Abbot Desiderius of Monte Cassino, solemnly invested Robert Guiscard with the duchies of Apulia, Calabria, and Sicily, and Richard of Aversa with the principality of Capua, in return for oaths of fealty and the promise of assistance in guarding the rights of the Church. This arrangement, which was based on no firmer foundation than the forged "Donation of Constantine", was destined to give the papacy independence from both the Eastern and Western Empires. Its first substantial result was Norman aid in taking Galeria, where Antipope Benedict X was hiding, and the end of the subordination of the papacy to the Roman nobles.

=== Subordination of Milan ===
Meanwhile, Nicholas II sent Peter Damian and Bishop Anselm of Lucca as legates to Milan, to resolve the conflict between the Patarenes and the archbishop and clergy. The result was a fresh triumph for the papacy. Archbishop Wido, facing ruinous ecclesiastical conflict in Milan, submitted to the terms of the legates, which subordinated Milan to Rome. The new relation was advertised by the unwilling attendance of Wido and the other Milanese bishops at the council summoned to the Lateran Palace in April 1059. This council not only continued the Hildebrandine reforms by sharpening the discipline of the clergy but marked an epoch in the history of the papacy by its famous regulation of future elections to the Holy See.

=== Election reform ===
Previously, papal elections had effectively been controlled by the Roman aristocracy, unless the Holy Roman emperor was strong enough to be able to intervene from a distance to impose his will. As a result of the battles with the Antipope Benedict X, Nicholas II wished to reform papal elections. At the synod held in the Lateran at Easter, 1059, Pope Nicholas brought 113 bishops to Rome to consider several reforms, including a change in the election procedure. The electoral reform adopted by that synod amounted to a declaration of independence on the part of the church. Henceforth, the candidate was to be selected by the cardinal bishops, and the remaining cardinals, clergy, nobility and laity would approve or reject the nomination.

== See also ==
- The Tusculan Papacy
- History of the papacy (1048–1257)
- List of popes

Catholic Church titles
Preceded by Stephen IX	Pope; 1059–61	Succeeded by Alexander II
