= History of the East–West Schism =

Events related to the 1054 split of Eastern and Western Churches

The East–West Schism that occurred in 1054 represents one of the most significant events in the history of Christianity. It includes various events and processes that led to the schism and also those events and processes that occurred as a result of the schism. Eastern and Western Christians had a history of differences and disagreements, some dating back to the period of Early Christianity. At the very root of what later became the Great Schism were several questions of pneumatology and ecclesiology. The most important theological difference occurred over various questions regarding the procession of the Holy Spirit, and the use of the filioque clause in the Nicene Creed. One of the main ecclesiological issues was the question of papal supremacy. Other points of difference were related to various liturgical, ritual, and disciplinary customs and practices. Some political and cultural processes also contributed to the breakout of the schism.

== Origins ==
Eric Plumer writes "the divergence of the Eastern and Western churches, leading ultimately to the East-West Schism, was a process of many centuries, influenced by a host of political, cultural and theological factors. Similarly, Roger Haight asserts "the [East-West Schism] should not be understood to have occurred in the mutual excommunications [of 1054]" because those excommunications were "only one factor in a much longer and larger story involving cultural, political and theological factors." Because so many factors contributed to the ever-widening separation between East and West, it is difficult to point to a specific date when it began or even identify a single primary cause of the schism. While most sources agree that the separation between East and West is clearly evident by the Photian schism in the 9th century, some point to tensions going back as far as the 4th century as the early signs of the separation between East and West. Orthodox apologists point to incidents as early as the 2nd century as examples of claims by Rome to papal primacy and rejection by Eastern Churches.

Some scholars have argued that sporadic schisms in the common unions took place under Pope Victor I (2nd century), Pope Stephen I (3rd century) and Pope Damasus I (4th and 5th century). Later on, disputes about theological and other questions led to schisms between the Churches in Rome and Constantinople from 482 to 519 and from 866 to 879. The idea that primacy in the Church was transferred along with the transfer of the imperial capital from Rome to Constantinople, was posited as early as the 6th century by John Philoponus and further advanced by Photios I of Constantinople in the 9th century. Constantinople, as the seat of the ruler of the empire and therefore of the world, was the highest among the patriarchates and, like the emperor, had the right to govern them.

After the fall and destruction of Jerusalem by the Romans, the early learning centers of the Church were Antioch and Alexandria. Founding of the Church of Alexandria had been assisted by Mark, one of the Seventy Apostles. Saint Thomas was said to be instrumental in establishing the Church in the Persian Empire and satellite kingdoms, although Saint Addai and Saint Mari, two of the Seventy Apostles were credited with most of the work of establishment in Persia. The Church of the East was as large as the Mediterranean Church for some centuries, especially in the 6th to 8th centuries with its movement into the Far East.

In the 4th century when the Roman emperors were trying to control the Church, theological questions were prevalent throughout the Roman Empire. The influence of Greek speculative thought on Christian thinking led to divergent and conflicting opinions. Christ's commandment to love others as He loved seemed to have been lost in the intellectual abstractions of the time. Theology was used as a weapon against opponent bishops, since being branded a heretic was the only sure way for a bishop to be removed by other bishops. Over the course of history, tensions have arisen when church leaders have been perceived to have overstepped their bounds.

=== Rise of Rome ===
The first institution to fail in the early Christian Empire was politics. In the 5th century, western imperial power fell prior to the invasion of the Barbarian kings. However, the increase in power of the pope resulted in the retread of previous politicians, which in effect blurred the fine line between secular and ecclesiastical power. Up until the ecumenical councils, Rome was regarded as an important centre of Christianity, especially since it was the capital of the Roman Empire. The eastern and southern Mediterranean bishops generally recognized a persuasive leadership and authority of the bishop of Rome, but the Mediterranean Church did not regard the bishop of Rome as any sort of infallible source, nor did they acknowledge any juridical authority of Rome. The church at Rome claimed a special authority over the other churches because of its connection with the apostles Peter and Paul. In the first three centuries, Rome gained increasing recognition as one of the centers of Christianity. However, the extant documents of that era yield no clear-cut claims to, or recognition, of papal primacy.

Historian Will Durant writes that, after Jerusalem, the church of Rome naturally became the primary church, the capital of Christianity. Rome had an early and significant Christian population. The Apostle Peter is seen as founder of the Church in Rome, and the bishops of Rome as his successors. While the Eastern cities of Alexandria and Antioch produced theological works, the bishops of Rome focused on administration.

Father Thomas Hopko, a leading Orthodox theologian, writes: "The church of Rome held a special place of honor among the earliest Christian churches. It was first among the communities that recognized each other as catholic churches holding the orthodox faith concerning God's Gospel in Jesus. According to St Ignatius, the bishop of Antioch who died a martyr's death in Rome around the year 110, 'the church which presides in the territories of the Romans' was 'a church worthy of God, worthy of honor, worthy of felicitation, worthy of praise, worthy of success, worthy of sanctification, and presiding in love, maintaining the law of Christ, bearer of the Father's name.' The Roman church held this place of honor and exercised a 'presidency in love' among the first Christian churches for two reasons. It was founded on the teaching and blood of the foremost Christian apostles Peter and Paul. And it was the church of the capital city of the Roman empire that then constituted the 'civilized world (oikoumene)'."

=== Quartodeciman controversy and beyond ===
Towards the end of the 2nd century, Victor, the Bishop of Rome, attempted to resolve the Quartodeciman controversy by excommunicating churches in the Roman province of Asia. This incident is cited by some Orthodox Christians as the first example of overreaching by the Bishop of Rome and resistance of such by Eastern churches. Laurent Cleenewerck suggests that this could be argued to be the first fissure between the Eastern and Western churches. The Quartodeciman controversy arose because Christians in the Roman province of Asia (Western Anatolia) celebrated Easter at the spring full moon, like the Jewish Passover, while the churches in the rest of the world observed the practice of celebrating it on the following Sunday ("the day of the resurrection of our Saviour") In 155, Anicetus, Bishop of Rome, presided over a church council at Rome that was attended by a number of bishops including Polycarp, Bishop of Smyrna. Although the council failed to reach agreement on the issue, ecclesiastical communion was preserved. A generation later, synods of bishops in Palestine, Pontus (Northern Anatolia) and Osrhoene in the east, and in Rome and Gaul in the west, unanimously declared that the celebration should be exclusively on Sunday. In 193, Pope Victor I presided over a council in Rome and subsequently sent a letter about the matter to Polycrates of Ephesus and the churches of the Roman province of Asia. In the same year, Polycrates presided over a council at Ephesus attended by several bishops throughout that province, which rejected Victor's authority and kept the province's paschal tradition. Thereupon, Victor attempted to cut off Polycrates and the others who took this stance from the common unity but later reversed his decision after bishops that included Saint Irenaeus, Bishop of Lugdunum in Gaul, interceded, recommending that Victor adopt the more tolerant stance of his predecessor, Anicetus.

Despite Victor's failure to carry out his intent to excommunicate the Asian churches, many Catholic apologists point to this episode as evidence of papal primacy and authority in the early Church, citing the fact that none of the bishops challenged his right to excommunicate but rather questioned the wisdom and charity of doing so. Orthodox apologists argue that Victor had to relent in the end and note that the Eastern Churches never granted Victor presidency over anything other than the Church of Rome. The rejection of Bishop Anicetus' position on the Quartodeciman by Polycarp and later Polycrates' letter to Pope Victor I has been used by Orthodox theologians as proof against the argument that the Churches in Asia Minor accepted the Primacy of the Bishop of Rome or papal supremacy.

The opinion of the Bishop of Rome was often sought, especially when the patriarchs of the Eastern Mediterranean were locked in fractious dispute. The bishops of Rome never obviously belonged to either the Antiochian or the Alexandrian schools of theology and usually managed to steer a middle course between whatever extremes were being propounded by theologians of either school. Because Rome was remote from the centres of Christianity in the eastern Mediterranean, it was frequently hoped its bishop would be more impartial. For instance, in 431, Cyril, the patriarch of Alexandria, appealed to Pope Celestine I, as well as the other patriarchs, charging the patriarch of Constantinople, Nestorius with heresy, which was dealt with at the Council of Ephesus.

Following the sack of Rome by invading European Goths, Rome slid into the Dark Ages which afflicted most parts of Western Europe, and became increasingly isolated and irrelevant to the wider Mediterranean Church. This was a situation which suited and pleased a lot of the Eastern Mediterranean patriarchs and bishops. It was not until the rise of Charlemagne and his successors that the Church of Rome arose out of obscurity on the back of the military successes of the western Mediterranean adventurers.

=== Council of Nicaea (325) ===
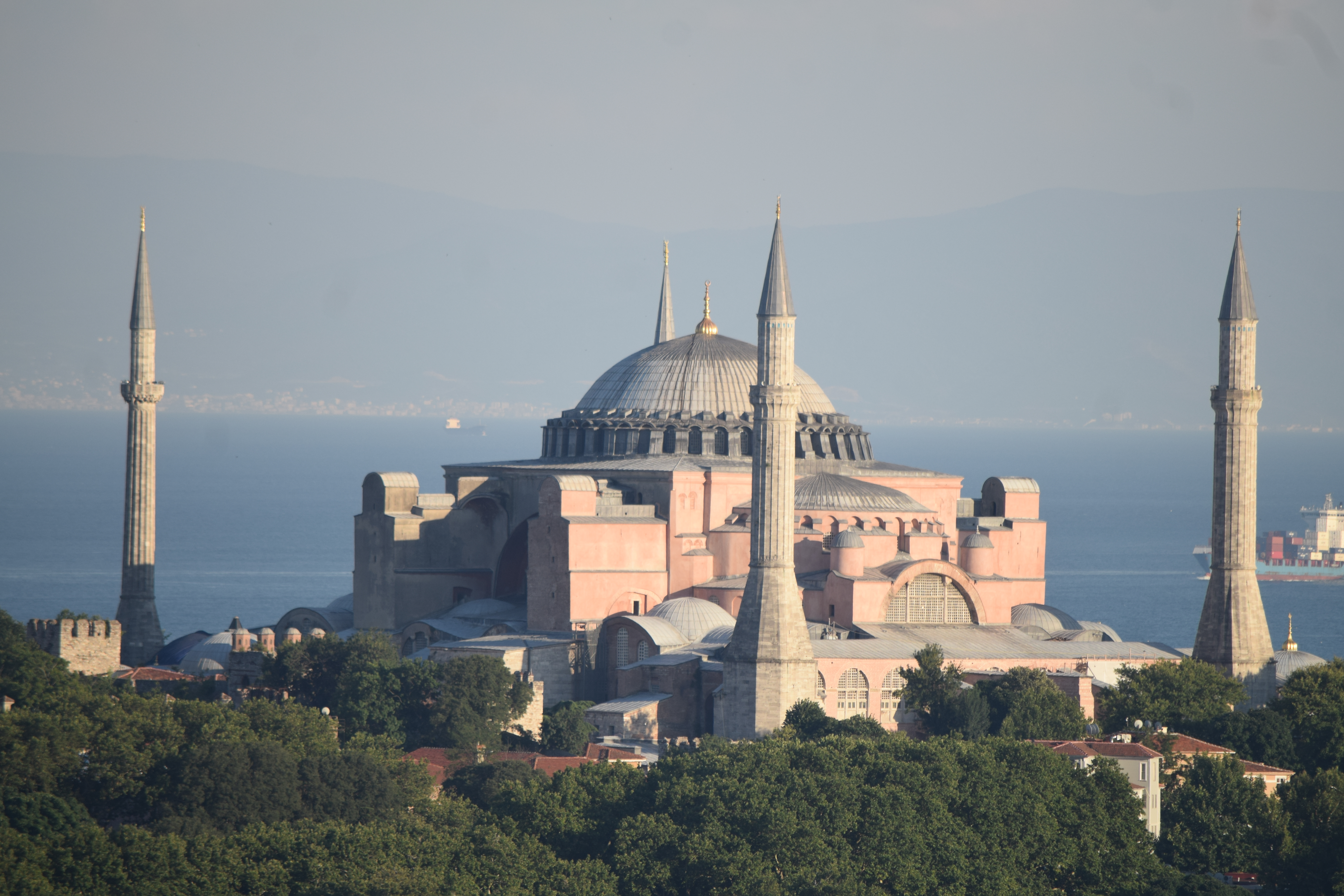
Hagia Sophia, cathedral of Constantinople at the time of the schism

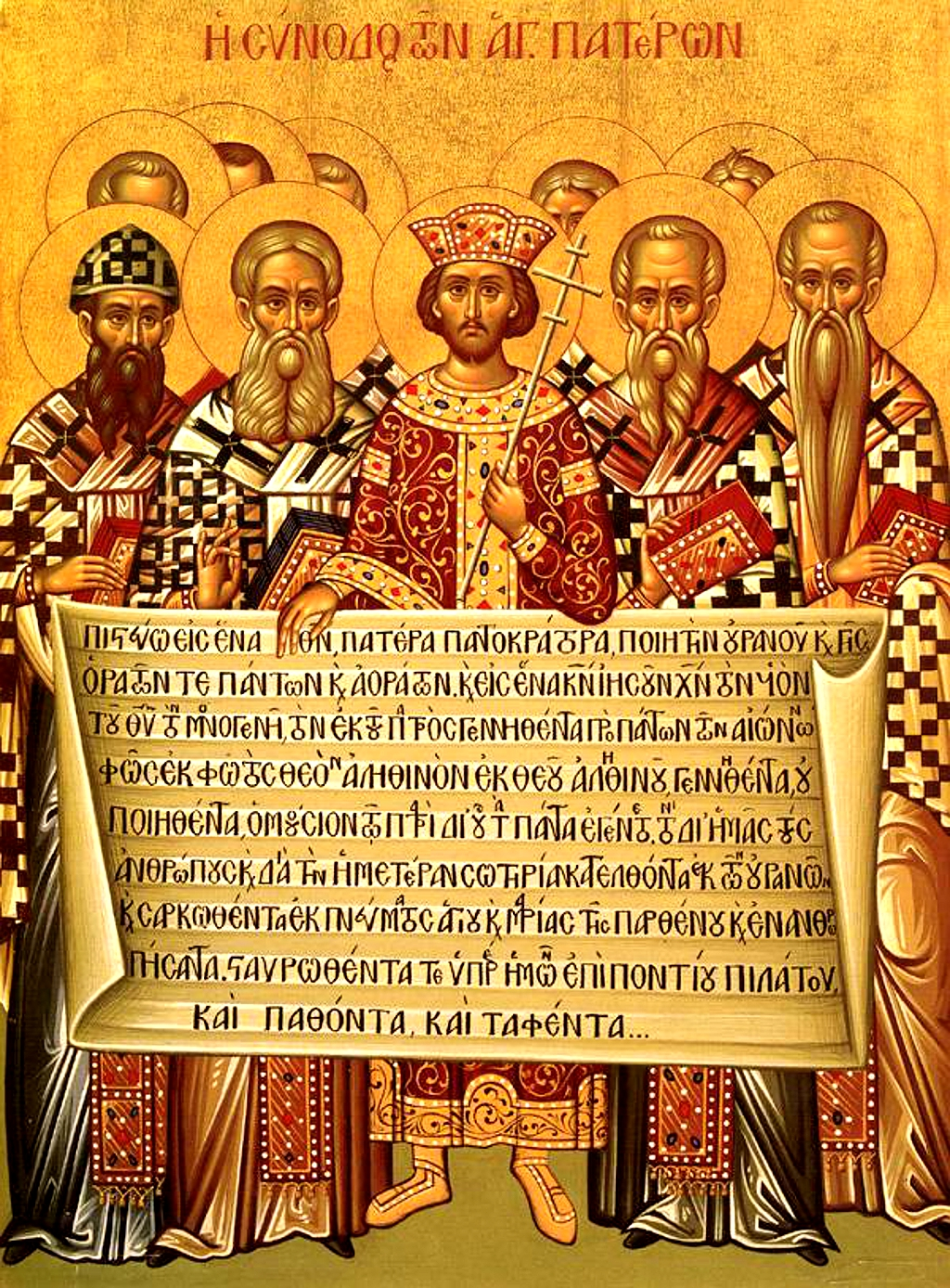
Icon depicting the Emperor Constantine (centre) and the bishops of the First Council of Nicaea (325) holding the Niceno–Constantinopolitan Creed of 381.

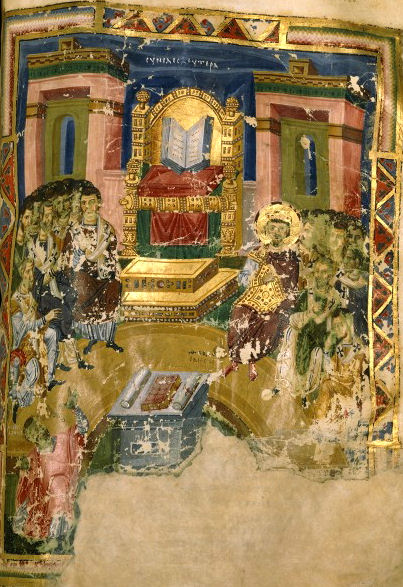
The Second Ecumenical Council whose additions to the original Nicene Creed lay at the heart of one of the theological disputes associated with the East–West Schism. (Illustration, 879–882 AD, from manuscript, Homilies of Gregory of Nazianzus, Bibliothèque nationale de France)

When Roman Emperor Constantine the Great embraced Christianity, he summoned the First Ecumenical Council at Nicaea in 325 to resolve a number of issues which troubled the Church. The bishops at the council confirmed the position of the metropolitan sees of Rome and Alexandria as having authority outside their own province, and also the existing privileges of the churches in Antioch and the other provinces. These sees were later called Patriarchates and were given an order of precedence: Rome, as capital of the empire was naturally given first place, then came Alexandria and Antioch. In a separate canon the council also approved the special honor given to Jerusalem over other sees subject to the same metropolitan.

The centre of politics in the empire shifted to the eastern Mediterranean. Rome lost the Senate to Constantinople and lost its status and gravitas as imperial capital. Soon the local bishop was elevated to patriarch under Constantine, as Metrophanes of Byzantium Thereafter, the bishop's connection with the imperial court meant that he was able to free himself from ecclesiastical dependency on Heraclea and in little more than half a century to obtain recognition of next-after-Rome ranking from the first Council held within the walls of the new capital. The Western bishops took no part, and the Latin Church recognized the see as ecumenical only in the mid-6th century: "The Bishop of Constantinople, however, shall have the prerogative of honour after the Bishop of Rome; because Constantinople is New Rome", thus raising it above the sees of Alexandria and Antioch. This has been described as sowing the seed for the ecclesiastical rivalry between Constantinople and Rome that was a factor leading to the schism between East and West. Alexandria's objections to Constantinople's promotion, which led to a constant struggle between the two sees in the first half of the 5th century, were supported by Rome, which proposed the theory that the most important sees were the three Petrine ones, with Rome in first place. However, after the Council of Chalcedon in 451, the position of the Patriarchate of Alexandria was weakened by a division in which the great majority of its Christian population followed the form of Christianity that its opponents called monophysitism.

=== Five patriarchs ===
Emperor Theodosius I called the Second Ecumenical Council, held at the new capital in 381. The council elevated the see of Constantinople to a position ahead of the other chief metropolitan sees, except that of Rome. It divided the eastern Roman Empire into five dioceses: Egypt (under Alexandria), the East (under Antioch), Asia (under Ephesus), Pontus (under Caesarea Cappadociae), and Thrace (originally under Heraclea, later under Constantinople). The council decreed that the synod of each province should manage the ecclesiastical affairs of that province alone, except for the privileges already recognized for Alexandria and Antioch.

In 382, a synod in Rome under Pope Damasus I protested against the raising of Constantinople to a position above Alexandria and spoke of Rome as "the apostolic see". Pope Siricius (384–399) claimed for papal decretals the same binding force as decisions of synods, Pope Innocent I (401–417) said that all major judicial cases should be reserved for the see of Rome, and Pope Boniface I (418–422) declared that the church of Rome stands to "the churches throughout the world as the head to its members" and that bishops everywhere, while holding the one same episcopal office, must "recognise those to whom, for the sake of ecclesiastical discipline, they should be subject". Pope Celestine I (422–432) considered that the condemnation of Nestorius by his own Roman synod in 430 was sufficient, but consented to the general council as "of benefit in manifesting the faith") Pope Leo I and his successors rejected canon 28 of the Council of Chalcedon, as a result of which it was not officially recorded even in the East until the 6th century. The Acacian schism (484–519), when, "for the first time, West lines up against East in a clear-cut fashion", ended with acceptance of a declaration insisted on by Pope Hormisdas (514–523) that "I hope I shall remain in communion with the apostolic see in which is found the whole, true, and perfect stability of the Christian religion". Earlier, in 494, Pope Gelasius I (492–496) wrote to Byzantine Emperor Anastasius, distinguishing the power of civil rulers from that of the bishops (called "priests" in the document), with the latter supreme in religious matters; he ended his letter with: "And if it is fitting that the hearts of the faithful should submit to all priests in general who properly administer divine affairs, how much the more is obedience due to the bishop of that see which the Most High ordained to be above all others, and which is consequently dutifully honoured by the devotion of the whole Church." Pope Nicholas I (858–867) made it clear that he believed the power of the papacy extended "over all the earth, that is, over every church".

=== Council at Chalcedon (451) ===
The Fourth Ecumenical Council at Chalcedon in 451, confirming the authority already held by Constantinople, granted its archbishop jurisdiction over Pontus and Thrace. The council also ratified an agreement between Antioch and Jerusalem, whereby Jerusalem held jurisdiction over three provinces, numbering it among the five great sees. There were now five patriarchs presiding over the Church within the Byzantine Empire, in the following order of precedence: the Patriarch of Rome, the Patriarch of Constantinople, the Patriarch of Alexandria, the Patriarch of Antioch and the Patriarch of Jerusalem. The pope was considered the first among equals.

Although Pope Leo I's delegates were absent when this resolution was passed, he recognized the council as ecumenical and confirmed its doctrinal decrees. He rejected its Canon 28 on the grounds that it contravened the sixth canon of Nicaea and infringed the rights of Alexandria and Antioch. However, by that time Constantinople, the permanent residence of the emperor, had in reality enormous influence, and had it not been for the opposition of Rome, its bishop could easily have been given first place among all the bishops. Eastern Orthodox churches state that the 28th Canon explicitly proclaimed the equality of the bishops of Rome and Constantinople, and that it established the highest court of ecclesiastical appeal in Constantinople.

In its disputed 28th Canon, the council also recognized an authority of Constantinople over bishops of dioceses "among the barbarians", which has been variously interpreted as referring either to all areas outside the Byzantine Empire or only to those in the vicinity of Pontus, Asia and Thrace or to non-Greeks within the empire. This canon was a source of friction between East and West until the mutual excommunications of 1054 made it irrelevant in that regard; but controversy about its applicability to the authority of the patriarchate of Constantinople still continues.

Canon 9 of the council also declared: "If a bishop or clergyman should have a difference with the metropolitan of the province, let him have recourse to the Exarch of the Diocese, or to the throne of the Imperial City of Constantinople, and there let it be tried." This has been interpreted as conferring on the see of Constantinople a greater privilege than what any council ever gave Rome.

=== Empires East and West ===
Disunion in the Roman Empire further contributed to disunion in the Church. The Emperor Diocletian famously divided the administration of the eastern and western portions of the empire in the early 4th century, though subsequent leaders (including Constantine) aspired to and sometimes gained control of both regions. Theodosius the Great, who established Nicene Christianity as the official religion of the Roman Empire (see Edict of Thessalonica), was the last emperor to rule over a united Roman Empire. Following his death in 395, the division into western and eastern halves, each for a few decades still under its own Emperor, was never reunited.

Following the sack of Rome in 410 by the Visigoths, Rome became increasingly isolated from the churches in the eastern and southern Mediterranean. This was a situation which suited and pleased many of the patriarchs and bishops of those churches.

The Western Roman Empire soon ceased to exist. In the early fifth century, its whole territory was overrun by Germanic tribes, and in 476, the Western Roman Empire in Italy was declared defunct, when the Scirian Odoacer deposed Emperor Romulus Augustulus and declared himself rex Italiae ("King of Italy").The Eastern Roman Empire (known also as the Byzantine Empire) continued to thrive. Thus, the political unity of the Roman Empire was the first to fall. When royal and imperial rule re-established itself, it had to contend with power wielded independently by the Church. In the East, however, imperial and later Islamic rule dominated the Eastern bishops of Byzantium. The Orthodox regions that were predominantly Slavic experienced period foreign dominance as well as period without infrastructure.

The Eastern Roman Empire (known also as the Byzantine Empire) continued to thrive and in the 6th century recovered Italy and other sections of the western Mediterranean shore. It soon lost most of that territory. It continued to hold Rome, as part of the Exarchate of Ravenna, until 751. In the West, the collapse of civil government left the Church practically in charge in many areas, and bishops took to administering secular cities and domains. In other areas, Christianity became mostly subject to the laws and customs of nations that owed no allegiance to the emperor. These Germanic peoples, particularly the Franks, influenced and changed the Latin Church. Many other factors caused the East and West to drift further apart. The dominant language of the West was Latin, whilst that of the East was Greek. Soon after the fall of the Western Empire, the number of individuals who spoke both Latin and Greek began to dwindle, and communication between East and West grew much more difficult. When the Latins showed up at councils in the East, they spoke in Latin which was not understood by the other delegates, who continued to speak Greek, which, in turn, was not understood by the Latins. Both sides became suspicious of the other. With linguistic unity gone, cultural unity began to crumble as well. The two halves of the Church were naturally divided along similar lines; they developed different rites and had different approaches to religious doctrines. Although the Great Schism was still centuries away, its outlines were already perceptible.

=== Decline of three patriarchies ===
By 661, Muslim Arabs had conquered the territories assigned to the patriarchates of Alexandria, Antioch and Jerusalem, which thereafter were never more than partially and temporarily recovered. In 732, Leo III the Isaurian, in revenge for the opposition of Pope Gregory III to the emperor's iconoclast policies, transferred Sicily, Calabria and Illyria from the patriarchate of Rome (whose jurisdiction until then extended as far east as Thessalonica) to that of Constantinople. The Constantinople patriarchate, after expanding eastward at the time of the Council of Chalcedon to take in Pontus and the Roman province of Asia, which at that time were still under the emperor's control, thus expanded equally to the west, and was practically coextensive with the Byzantine Empire.

=== Quinisext Council (692) ===
The West's rejection of the Quinisext Council of 692 led to pressure from the Eastern Empire on the West to reject many Latin customs as non-Orthodox. The Latin practices that had gotten the attention of the other Patriarchates and that had been condemned by this Council included the practice of celebrating Mass on weekdays in Lent (rather than having Pre-Sanctified Liturgies); fasting on Saturdays throughout the year; omitting the "Alleluia" in Lent; depicting Christ as a lamb; using unleavened bread. Larger disputes were revealed regarding Eastern and Western attitudes toward celibacy for priests and deacons, with the Council affirming the right of married men to become priests (though forbidding priests to marry and forbidding bishops to live with their wives) and prescribing deposition for anyone who attempted to separate a clergyman other than a bishop from his wife, or for any cleric other than a bishop who dismissed his wife.

Pope Sergius I, who was of Syrian origin, rejected the council, preferring, he said, "to die rather than consent to erroneous novelties". Though a loyal subject of the empire, he would not be "its captive in matters of religion" and refused to sign the canons. Emperor Justinian II ordered his arrest and abduction to Constantinople by the notoriously violent protospatharios Zacharias. However, the militia of the exarchate of Ravenna frustrated the attempt. Zacharias nearly lost his life in his attempt to arrest Sergius I. Meanwhile, in Visigothic Hispania, the council was ratified by the Eighteenth Council of Toledo at the urging of King Wittiza, who was vilified by later chroniclers for his decision. Fruela I of Asturias reversed the decision of Toledo sometime during his reign.

=== Papal Supremacy and Pentarchy ===
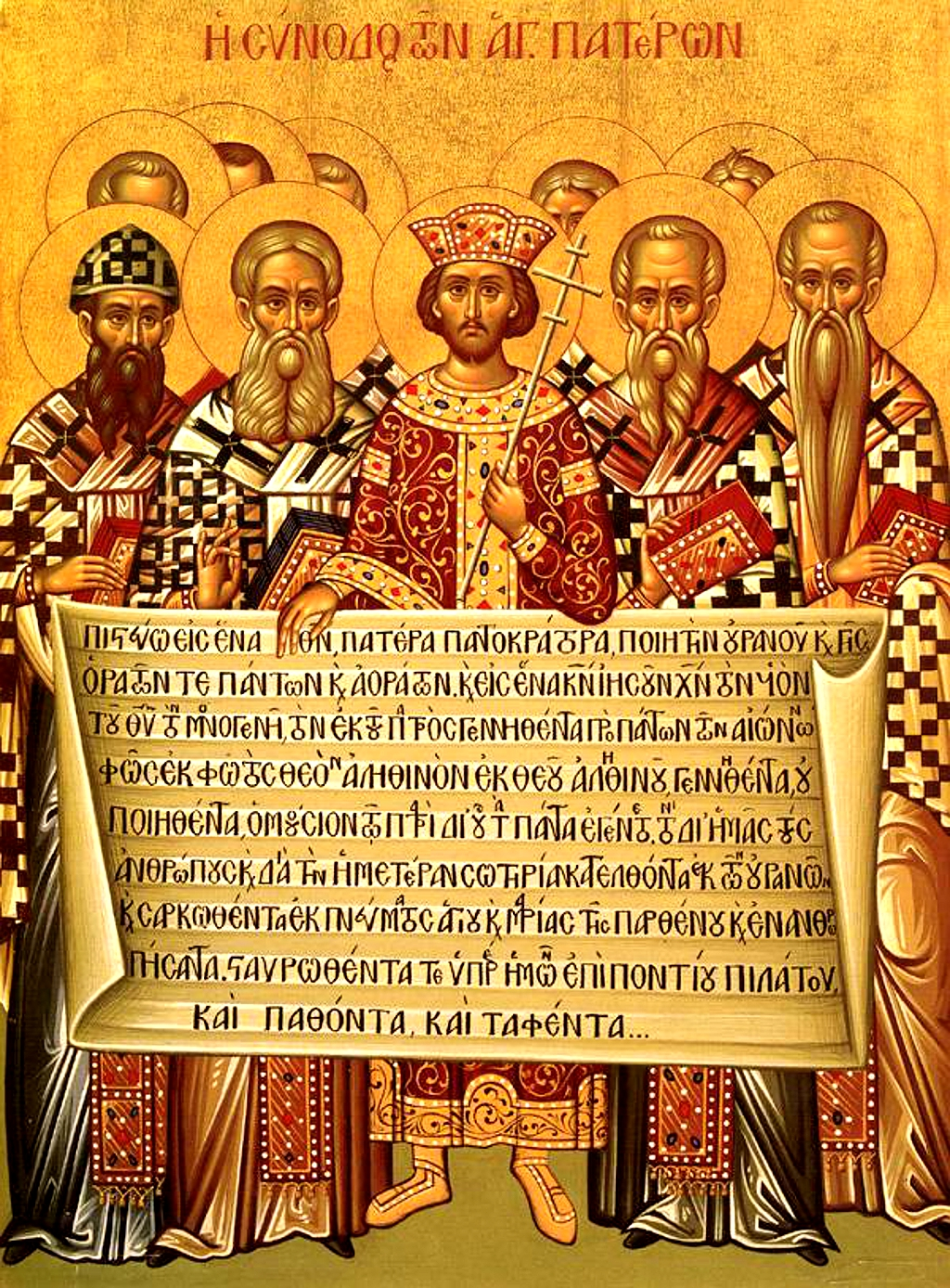
Icon depicting the Emperor Constantine (centre) and the bishops of the First Council of Nicaea (325) holding the Niceno–Constantinopolitan Creed of 381.

The primary causes of the schism were disputes over conflicting claims of jurisdiction, in particular over papal authority—Pope Leo IX claimed he held authority over the four Eastern patriarchs – and over the insertion of the Filioque clause into the Nicene Creed by the Western patriarch in 1014. The seventh canon of the Council of Ephesus declared:

It is unlawful for any man to bring forward, or to write, or to compose a different (ἑτέραν) Faith as a rival to that established by the holy Fathers assembled with the Holy Ghost in Nicæa. But those who shall dare to compose a different faith, or to introduce or offer it to persons desiring to turn to the acknowledgment of the truth, whether from Heathenism or from Judaism, or from any heresy whatsoever, shall be deposed, if they be bishops or clergymen; bishops from the episcopate and clergymen from the clergy; and if they be laymen, they shall be anathematized

Eastern Orthodox today state that this Canon of the Council of Ephesus explicitly prohibited modification of the Nicene Creed drawn up by the first Ecumenical Council in 325, the wording of which but, it is claimed, not the substance, had been modified by the second Ecumenical Council, making additions such as "who proceeds from the Father". In the Orthodox view, the Bishop of Rome (i.e. the Pope) would have universal primacy in a reunited Christendom, as primus inter pares without power of jurisdiction.

Eastern Orthodox argue that the seventh canon of the Council of Ephesus explicitly prohibited modification of the Nicene Creed by any man (not by Ecumenical church council) drawn up by the first Ecumenical Council in 325. In reality, the council made no exception for an ecumenical council or any other body of bishops, and the Greeks participating in the Council of Florence emphatically denied that even an ecumenical council had the power to add anything to the creed. The creed quoted in the Acts of the Council of Ephesus of 431 (the third ecumenical council) is that of the first ecumenical council, that of Nicaea (325), without the modifications that the second ecumenical council, held in Constantinople in 381, is understood to have made to it, such as the addition of "who proceeds from the Father". Eastern Orthodox theologians state this change of the wording of the churches' original creed, was done to address various teachings outside of the church in specific the Macedonius I of Constantinople teaching which the council claimed was a distortion of the church's teaching on the Holy Spirit. This was not a change of the orthodoxy of the churches' original creed. Thus the word ἑτέραν in the seventh canon of the later Council of Ephesus is understood as meaning "different", "contradictory", and not "another" in the sense of mere explanatory additions to the already existing creed. Some scholars hold that the additions attributed to the First Council of Constantinople were adopted only with the 451 Council of Chalcedon, 20 years after that of Ephesus, and even that the Council of Ephesus, in which Alexandrian influence was dominant, was by this canon excluding the Constantinopolitan Creed, which eventually annexed the name and fame of the creed adopted at Nicaea.

There were other less significant catalysts for the Schism however, including variance over liturgical practices.

=== Schism of 863 ===
A major break between the Churches of Rome and Constantinople occurred in 863 and lasted for several years. In 858, Byzantine Emperor Michael III enforced the deposition of Patriarch Ignatios of Constantinople, replacing him with new Patriarch Photios. At least five councils (859, 861, 867, 869-870, 879-880) as a result. Appealed by the supporters of Ignatios, Pope Nicholas I also held a synod at the Lateran in 863, reverting the decisions of 858, confirming Ignatios as patriarch, and anathematizing Photios. This was seen by the East as an unacceptable intervention, since Nicholas was intervening in the process of election and confirmation of patriarchs in ecclesial jurisdictions other than his own. By attempting to remove Photius and reappoint Ignatius on his own authority and decree, the Nicolas was also intervening in the matters of imperial authority as well as the other churches of the East and their own internal councils and authorities, which they understood to be outside the pope's own jurisdiction of Rome. In response to that, Photius convened a council in 867 to address the question of Papal supremacy and also the use of Filioque clause in the Creed.

In the Council at Constantinople in 867, Pope Nicholas I was deposed, and the teaching of the Filioque was condemned. The council excommunicated Nicholas, who was later replaced by Pope Adrian II after the death of Nicholas. The council also rejected Nicholas' efforts to convert Bulgaria.

The council of 867 was followed by the Council of Constantinople in 869–870, which annulled the decisions of 867. The Council of Constantinople in 879-880 then restored the conclusions of the Council of 867. The Roman Catholic Church rejects the councils of 861, 867 and 879-880 but accepts the council of 869–870.

== Mutual excommunication of 1054 ==
Changes in extent of the Empire ruled from Constantinople. 476 End of the Western Empire; 550 Conquests of Justinian I; 717 Accession of Leo the Isaurian; 867 Accession of Basil I; 1025 Death of Basil II; 1095 Eve of the First Crusade; 1170 Under Manuel I; 1270 Under Michael VIII Palaiologos; 1400 Before the fall of Constantinople

Most of the direct causes of the Great Schism, however, are far less grandiose than the famous filioque. The relations between the papacy and the Byzantine court were good in the years leading up to 1054. Emperor Constantine IX and Pope Leo IX were allied through the mediation of the Lombard catepan of Italy, Argyrus, who had spent years in Constantinople, originally as a political prisoner. Leo and Argyrus led armies against the ravaging Normans, but the papal forces were defeated at the Battle of Civitate in 1053, which resulted in the pope being imprisoned at Benevento, where he took it upon himself to learn Greek. Argyrus had not arrived at Civitate, and his absence caused a rift in papal-imperial relations.

Meanwhile, the Normans were busy imposing Latin customs, including the unleavened bread—with papal approval. Michael I, Patriarch of Constantinople, then ordered Leo, Archbishop of Ochrid, to write a letter to the bishop of Trani, John, an Easterner, in which he attacked the "Judaistic" practices of the West, namely the use of unleavened bread. The letter was sent by John to all the bishops of the West, including the pope, and the letter was passed to Humbert of Mourmoutiers, the cardinal-bishop of Silva Candida, who translated the letter into Latin and brought it to the pope, who ordered a reply to be made to each charge and a defense of papal supremacy to be laid out in a response.

In 1054, Pope Leo IX sent a letter to Michael Cerularius that cited a large portion of the forgery called the Donation of Constantine, believing it genuine. The official status of this letter is acknowledged in the 1913 Catholic Encyclopedia, Volume 5, entry on Donation of Constantine. Leo IX assured the Patriarch that the donation was genuine, so only the apostolic successor to Peter possessed that primacy and was the rightful head of all the Church. The Patriarch rejected the claims of papal primacy.

Michael became convinced to avoid debate and prevent the impending breach. However, Humbert and the pope made no concessions, and Humbert was sent with legatine powers to the imperial capital to solve the questions raised once and for all. Humbert, Frederick of Lorraine, and Peter, Archbishop of Amalfi, set out in early spring and arrived in April 1054. They were met with a hostile reception. They stormed out of the palace, leaving the papal response with Michael, whose anger matched their own. The seals on the letter had been tampered with and the legates had published, in Greek, an earlier, far less civil, draft of the letter for the entire populace to read. The patriarch refused to recognize their authority. When Pope Leo died on 19 April 1054, the legates' authority legally ceased, but they ignored this technicality.

In response to the patriarch's refusal to address the issues at hand, the legatine mission took an extreme measure. On 16 July 1054, the three legates produced a Charter of Excommunication (lat. charta excommunicationis), directed against Patriarch Michael of Constantinople, Archbishop Leo of Ohrid, and their followers. On the same day, legates entered the church of the Hagia Sophia during the divine liturgy and placed the charter on the altar. In the charter, papal legates made 11 accusations against Michael and "the backers of his foolishness", beginning with that of promoting to the episcopacy men who have been castrated and of rebaptizing those already baptized in the name of the Trinity, and ending with the accusation of refusing communion and baptism to menstruating women and of refusing to be in communion with those who tonsure their heads and shave their beards. Denial of the procession of the Holy Spirit from the Son is given seventh place in the list of Greek errors, and a reference was made regarding the alleged Greek exclusion of that doctrine from the Creed.

The legates left Constantinople two days later, after an audience with the emperor. By the time of their departure, the city was near riot. The patriarch had the support of the people against the emperor, who had supported the legates to his own detriment. To assuage popular anger, Argyrus' family in Constantinople was arrested. An imperial envoy, sent to invite legates to come back for further discuusions, reached them at Selymbria. They attempted to return but failed and departed for Rome. At that point, Cerularius decided to strike back. A synod of 21 metropolitans and bishops, held on 20 July 1054 in Constantinople and presided by Cerularius, in turn excommunicated the legates. On 24 July, the anathema was officially proclaimed in the Hagia Sophia Church, and copies of the legatine charter were set to be burnt, while the original was placed in the patriarchal archive. Only the legates were anathematized, and a general reference was made to all who support them, but there was no explicit excommunication of the entire Western Christianity or the Church of Rome.

Eastern Orthodox Bishop Kallistos (formerly Timothy Ware) writes that the choice of Cardinal Humbert was unfortunate, for both he and Patriarch Michael I were men of stiff and intransigent temper... . After [an initial, unfriendly encounter] the patriarch refused to have further dealings with the legates. Eventually Humbert lost patience, and laid a Charter of Excommunication against Patriarch Michael I on the altar of the Church of the Holy Wisdom... . Michael and his synod retaliated by anathematizing Humbert.

The consummation of the schism is generally dated from 1054, when this sequence of events took place. However, these events only triggered the beginning of the schism. The schism was not actually consummated by the seemingly mutual excommunications. The New Catholic Encyclopedia reports that the legates had been careful not to intimate that the Charter of Excommunication implied a general excommunication of the Byzantine Church. The charter excommunicated only Patriarch Micheal Cerularius, Archbishop Leo of Ochrid, and their adherents. Thus, the New Catholic Encyclopedia argues that the dispute need not have produced a permanent schism any more than excommunication of any "contumacious bishop". The schism began to develop when all the other Eastern patriarchs supported Cerularius. According to the New Catholic Encyclopedia, it was the support of Emperor Michael VI Stratiotikos that impelled them to support Cerularius. Some have questioned the validity of the charter on the grounds that Pope Leo IX had died at that time and so the authority of the legates to issue such a document is unclear.

=== Aftermath ===
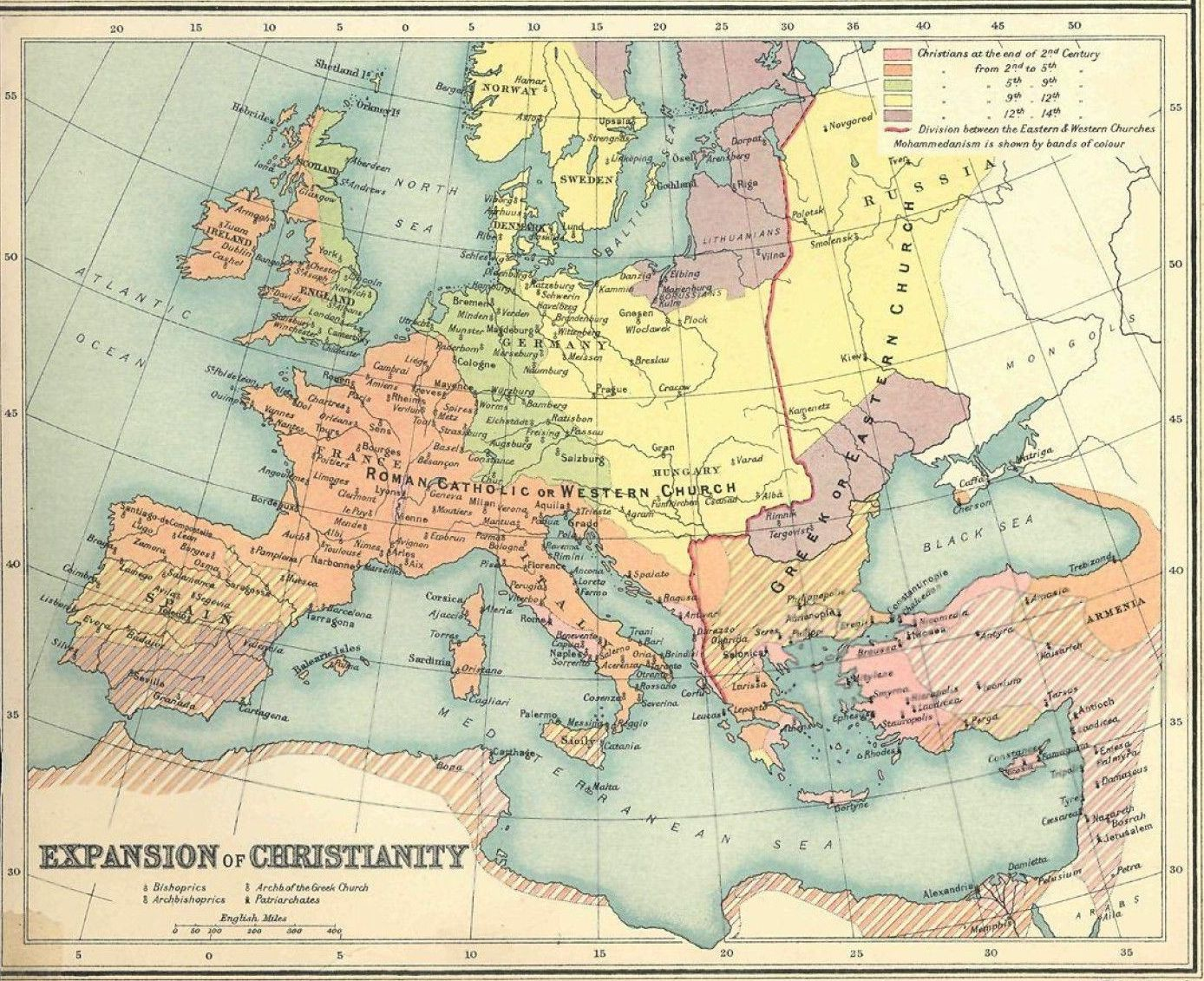
Division between the Eastern and Western Churches in 1054 according to the "Atlas of the Historical Geography of the Holy Land"

At the time of the excommunications, many contemporary historians, including Byzantine chroniclers, did not consider the event significant. Francis Dvornik states: "In spite of what happened in 1054, the faithful of both church remained long unaware of any change in their relations and acts of intercommunion were so numerous that 1054 as the date of the schism becomes inadmissible." Kallistos Ware agrees: "Even after 1054 friendly relations between East and West continued. The two parts of Christendom were not yet conscious of a great gulf of separation between them. ... The dispute remained something of which ordinary Christians in the East and West were largely unaware." In 1089, the Russian Church felt so little separated from the Western that it instituted a liturgical feast to commemorate the formerly disputed translation of about half of the relics of Saint Nicholas of Myra from Asia to Bari in Italy just two years earlier. This fluidity explains in part the different interpretations of the geographical line of division in the two maps given here, one drawn up in the West, the other in a country where Eastern Orthodoxy predominates. Areas such as the extreme south of Italy are interpreted variously as adhering to either East or West. And even in areas whose rulers took one position, there were some who gave their allegiance to the other side. An example is Kingdom of Hungary, where the Roman Catholic Church was upheld by the crown from the time of Stephen I, but "monasteries and convents belonging to the Byzantine Church were founded sporadically in the eleventh century.

Efforts were made in subsequent centuries by popes and patriarchs to heal the rift between the churches. However, a number of factors and historical events worked to widen the separation over time.

== East and West since 1054 ==
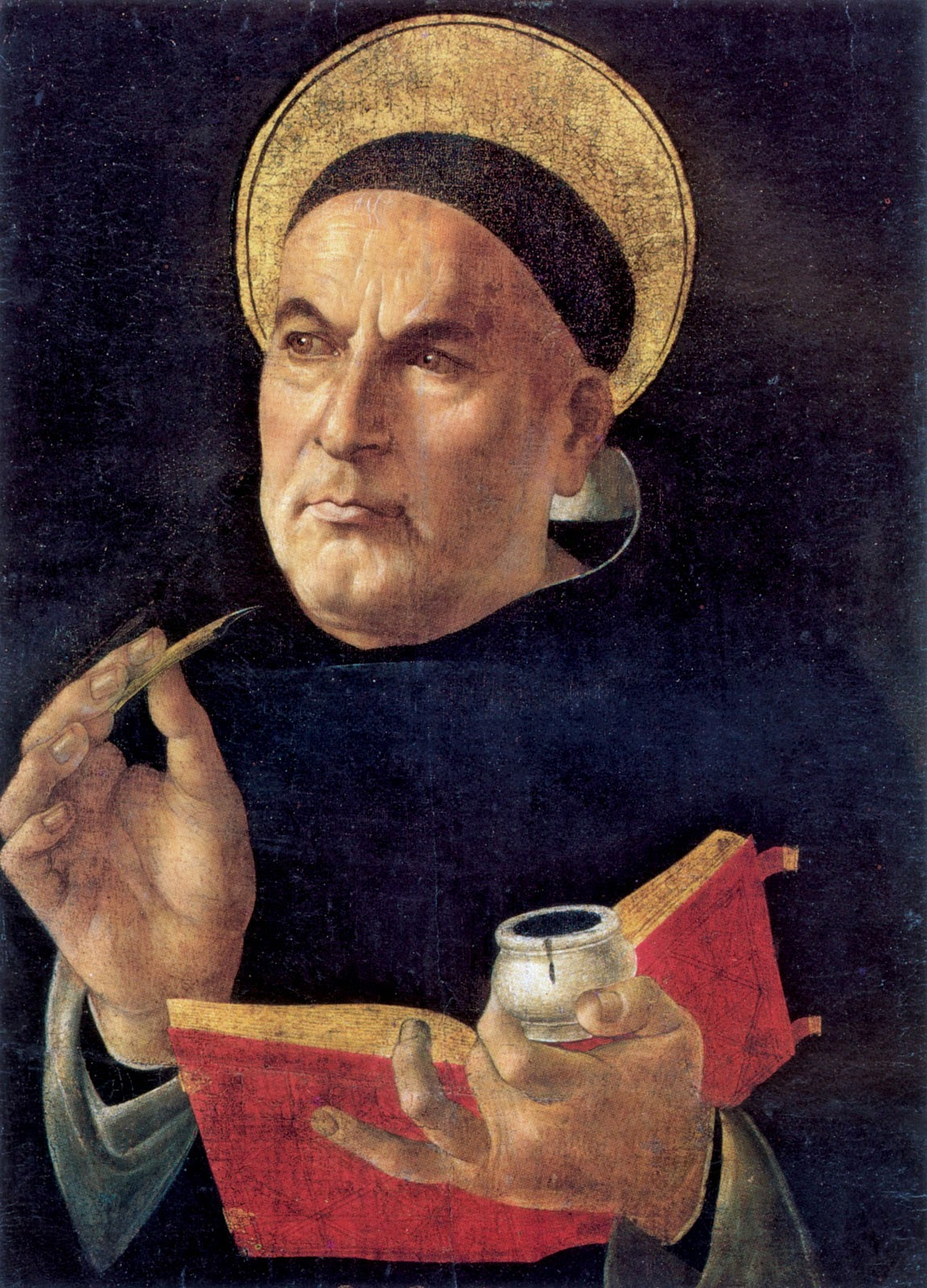
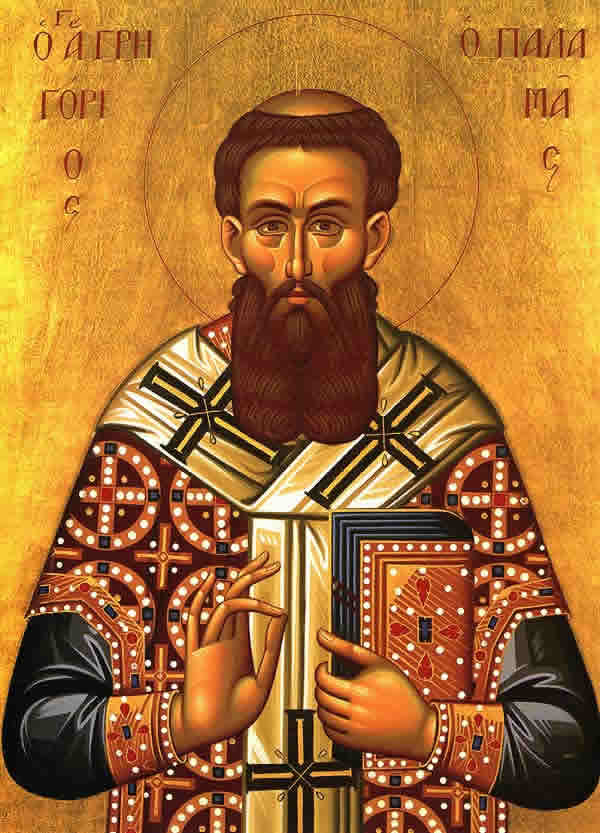
After the Great Schism of 1054, Roman Catholicism and Eastern Orthodoxy continued to move further away theologically. Scholasticism, reaching its peak under Thomas Aquinas (left) was adopted by the Roman Catholic Church as its main doctrine, whereas hesychasm, famously defended by Gregory Palamas (right) was made central to its doctrine. Thomism's divine simplicity stands in direct opposition to Palamite essence-energy distinction. Canonization of Thomas Aquinas was counteracted with his condemnation at the Hesychast councils, which canonised Palamas in response, thereby solidifying the schism.

The events of July 1054 had various religious and political consequences, both in East and West. Upon their return to Rome in the late summer of 1054, Cardinal Humbert and his colleagues found the Roman see still in the state of vacancy. Since there was no pope, all discussions and decisions regarding the Constantinopolitan events of July 1054 had to be postponed, until the next papal conclave. At that time, political situation in Italy was complex, which prolonged the vacancy until April 1055, when new Pope Victor II was elected. Victor II was preoccupied with the affairs of the Holy Roman Empire, but after his death in summer of 1057, the papacy was given to Cardinal Frederick of Lorraine, one of three envoys of 1054, who was elected pope as Stephen IX. Faced with the Norman menace in southern Italy, Stephen IX decided to send a delegation to Byzantine Emperor Isaac I Komnenos. Papal legates departed from Rome at the beginning of 1058, but when they reached the Byzantine-held Bari, news came that Stephen IX had died, and mission was abandoned.

It remained unknown whether the failed mission of 1058 had both political and religious aspects, as was the case with the earlier mission of 1054 and also with several later missions. In 1073, contacts between Constantinople and Rome were initiated by Byzantine Emperor Michael VII Doukas, who sent envoys to Pope Gregory VII, and on that occasion some discussions were held regarding both political and religious issues, but no agreement was reached. In 1089, Pope Urban II held the Council of Melfi, reopening the discussion between West and East. In September 1089, a local council was held in Constantinople, reexamining relations between the East and West. Similar discussions between Latins and Greeks were also held in 1098 at the Council of Bari.

By the end of the 11th century, the two churches had drifted further apart and continued to diverge over a period of several centuries, with occasional periods of improved relations, marked by several failed attempts of reconciliation. Bishop Kallistos Ware writes: "Even after 1054 friendly relations between East and West continued. The two parts of Christendom were not yet conscious of a great gulf of separation between them. ... The dispute remained something of which ordinary Christians in East and West were largely unaware".

Starting from the late 11th century, dependency of Byzantine Empire on the naval forces of Republic of Venice and, to a lesser extent, Republic of Genoa and Republic of Pisa, led to predominance of Roman Catholic merchants in Byzantium (they were getting major trading concessions starting from the 1080s), subsequently causing economic and social upheaval. Together with the perceived arrogance of the Italians, it fueled popular resentment amongst the middle and lower classes both in the countryside and in the cities. By the second half of the 12th century practically uncontrollable rivalry between competitors from different city states made it to Italians raiding quarters of other Italians in the capital, and retaliatory draconian measures by the Byzantine authorities led to subsequent deterioration of inter-religious relations in the city. When in 1182 regency of empress mother Maria of Antioch, an ethnical French notorious for the favoritism shown to Latin merchants and the big aristocratic land-owners, was deposed by Andronikos I Komnenos on the wake of popular support, the new emperor allowed mobs to massacre hated foreigners. Henceforth Byzantine foreign policy was invariably perceived as sinister and anti-Latin in the West.

=== Fourth Crusade and other military conflicts ===
During the Fourth Crusade, Latin crusaders and Venetian merchants sacked Constantinople, looting The Church of Holy Wisdom and various other Orthodox Holy sites and converting them to Latin Catholic worship. Various holy artifacts from these Orthodox holy places were then taken to the West. This event and the final treaty established the Latin Empire of the East and the Latin Patriarch of Constantinople (with various other Crusader states). This period of rule over the Byzantine Empire is known among Eastern Orthodox as Frangokratia (dominion by the Franks). An attempt by the Latin Empire to capture the city of Adrianople, then a Bulgarian possession, was defeated in the Battle of Adrianople (1205).

In northern Europe, the Teutonic Knights, after their successes in the northern crusades, attempted to conquer the Orthodox Russian Republics of Pskov and Novgorod, an enterprise endorsed by Pope Gregory IX. One of the major defeats they suffered was the Battle of the Ice in 1242. Sweden also undertook several campaigns against Orthodox Novgorod. There were also conflicts between Catholic Poland and Orthodox Russia. Such conflicts solidified the schism between East and West.

=== Second Council of Lyon (1272) ===
The Second Council of Lyon was convoked to act on a pledge by Byzantine Emperor Michael VIII to reunite the Eastern church with the West. Wishing to end the Great Schism, Gregory X had sent an embassy to Michael VIII, who had reconquered Constantinople, putting an end to the remnants of the Latin Empire in the East, and he asked Latin despots in the East to curb their ambitions. On 29 June (Feast of Saints Peter and Paul patronal feast of Popes), Gregory X celebrated a Mass in St John's Church, where both sides took part. The council declared that the Roman church possessed "the supreme and full primacy and authority over the universal Catholic Church."

The council was seemingly a success but did not provide a lasting solution to the schism; the emperor was anxious to heal the schism, but the Eastern clergy proved to be obstinate. In 1275, Patriarch Joseph I Galesiotes of Constantinople abdicated and was replaced by John XI Bekkos, a convert to the cause of union. In spite of a sustained campaign by Bekkos to defend the union intellectually, and vigorous and brutal repression of opponents by Michael, the vast majority of Byzantine Christians remained implacably opposed to union with the Latin "heretics". Michael's death in December 1282 put an end to the union of Lyons. His son and successor Andronicus II repudiated the union, and Bekkos was forced to abdicate, being exiled and imprisoned until his death in 1297.

=== Council of Ferrara-Florence (1439) ===
In the 15th century, the Eastern Emperor John VIII Palaeologus, pressed hard by the Ottoman Turks, was keen to ally himself with the West, and to do so he arranged with Pope Eugene IV for discussions about reunion to be held again, this time at the Council of Ferrara-Florence. After several long discussions, the emperor managed to convince the Eastern representatives to accept the Western doctrines of filioque, purgatory and the supremacy of the papacy. On 6 June 1439, an agreement was signed by all the Eastern bishops present but one, Mark of Ephesus, who held that Rome continued in both heresy and schism. It seemed that the Great Schism had been ended. However, upon their return, the Eastern bishops found their agreement with the West broadly rejected by the populace and by civil authorities (with the notable exception of the emperors of the East who remained committed to union until the Fall of Constantinople two decades later). The union signed at Florence has never been accepted by the Eastern churches.

== Twentieth century and beyond ==
=== Eastern Catholicism ===
The Eastern Catholic Churches consider themselves to have reconciled the East and West Schism by keeping their prayers and rituals similar to those of Eastern Orthodoxy, while also accepting the primacy of the Bishop of Rome. Some Eastern Orthodox charge that joining in this unity comes at the expense of ignoring critical doctrinal differences and past atrocities.

Since the beginnings of the Uniate movement, there have been periodic conflicts between the Orthodox and Uniate in Ukraine and Belarus, then under Polish rule, and later also in Transylvania (see the Romanian Church United with Rome). During Russia's Time of Troubles there was a plan by the conquering Polish monarchy (of Latin Rite, not Uniate) to convert all of Russia to Roman Catholicism. The Russian national holiday, Unity Day, was established because of this conflict. Patriarch Hermogenes was martyred by the Poles and their supporters during this period (see also Polish–Lithuanian–Muscovite Commonwealth). Similar pressure was also used by the Orthodox against Eastern Catholic Churches such as the Ukrainian Greek Catholic Church.

At a meeting in Balamand, Lebanon in June 1993, the Joint International Commission for the Theological Dialogue between the Roman Catholic Church and the Orthodox Church the delegates of the Eastern Orthodox Churches declared "and that what has been called 'uniatism' can no longer be accepted either as a method to be followed nor as a model of the unity our Churches are seeking".

At the same time, the Commission stated:

- Concerning the Eastern Catholic Churches, it is clear that they, as part of the Catholic Communion, have the right to exist and to act in response to the spiritual needs of their faithful.
- The Oriental Catholic Churches who have desired to re-establish full communion with the See of Rome and have remained faithful to it, have the rights and obligations which are connected with this communion.

=== Vatican Councils ===
The doctrine of papal primacy was further developed in 1870 at the First Vatican Council which declared that "in the disposition of God the Roman church holds the preeminence of ordinary power over all the other churches". This council also affirmed the dogma of papal infallibility, declaring that the infallibility of the Christian community extends to the pope, when he defines a doctrine concerning faith or morals to be held by the whole Church.

A major event of the Second Vatican Council, known as Vatican II, was the issuance by Pope Paul VI and Orthodox Patriarch Athenagoras of a joint expression of regret for many of the past actions that had led up to the Great Schism, expressed as the Catholic-Orthodox Joint declaration of 1965. At the same time, they lifted the mutual excommunications dating from the 11th century.

=== Efforts at reconciliation ===
On June 29, 1995, Pope John Paul II and Patriarch Bartholomew I of Constantinople again withdrew the excommunications imposed in the 11th century and concelebrated the Eucharist together. In May 1999, John Paul II was the first pope since the Great Schism to visit an Eastern Orthodox country: Romania. Upon greeting John Paul II, the Romanian Patriarch Teoctist stated: "The second millennium of Christian history began with a painful wounding of the unity of the Church; the end of this millennium has seen a real commitment to restoring Christian unity." Pope John Paul II visited other heavily Orthodox areas such as Ukraine, despite lack of welcome at times, and he said that healing the divisions between Western and Eastern Christianity was one of his fondest wishes.

The Roman Catholic Church recently has shown some flexibility on the Filioque issue. In accordance with the Roman Catholic Church's practice of including the clause when reciting the Creed in Latin, but not when reciting the Creed in Greek, Popes John Paul II and Benedict XVI have recited the Nicene Creed jointly with Patriarchs Demetrius I and Bartholomew I in Greek without the Filioque clause. The action of these patriarchs in reciting the creed together with the popes has been strongly criticized by some elements of Eastern Orthodoxy.

== See also ==
- Western Christianity
- Eastern Christianity
- Western Rite Orthodoxy

== Bibliography ==
- Bloch, Herbert (1986). Monte Cassino in the Middle Ages. Vol. 1. Roma: Edizioni di Storia e Letteratura.
- Charanis, Peter (1969) [1955]. "The Byzantine Empire in the Eleventh Century". A History of the Crusades. Vol. 1 (2nd ed.). Madison: University of Wisconsin Press. pp. 177–219. ISBN 9780299048341.
- Kidd, Beresford J. (2010) [1927]. The Churches of Eastern Christendom: From A.D. 451 to the Present Time. Routledge: New York. ISBN 9781136212789.
- Mansi, Joannes Dominicus, ed. (1774). Sacrorum conciliorum nova et amplissima collectio. Vol. 19. Venetia: Antonius Zatta.
- Aidan Nichols. Rome and the Eastern Churches: a Study in Schism, 1992.
- Siecienski, Anthony Edward (2010). The Filioque: History of a Doctrinal Controversy. Oxford University Press. ISBN 9780195372045.
