= Pope Stephen IX =

Head of the Catholic Church from 1057 to 1058

- Bishop of Rome
- Church: Catholic Church
- Papacy began: 3 August 1057
- Papacy ended: 29 March 1058
- Predecessor: Victor II
- Successor: Nicholas II

Personal details
- Born: Frederick of Lorraine c. 1020 Lorraine, Holy Roman Empire
- Died: 29 March 1058 (aged 37–38) Florence, March of Tuscany, Holy Roman Empire

Pope Stephen IX (Latin: Stephanus, christened Frederick; c. 1020 – 29 March 1058) was the Bishop of Rome and ruler of the Papal States from 3 August 1057 to his death on 29 March 1058. He was a member of the Ardenne-Verdun family, who ruled the Duchy of Lorraine, and started his ecclesiastical career as a canon in Liège. He was invited to Rome by Pope Leo IX, who made him chancellor in 1051 and one of three legates to Constantinople in 1054. The failure of their negotiations with Patriarch Michael I Cerularius of Constantinople and Archbishop Leo of Ohrid led to the permanent East–West Schism. He continued as chancellor to the next pope, Victor II, and was elected abbot of the Benedictine monastery of Montecassino.

Stephen was elected to succeed Victor on 2 August 1057. As pope, Stephen retained the Montecassino abbacy, enforced the Gregorian Reform, and continued Leo IX's efforts to expel Normans from southern Italy. He died in Florence, apparently poisoned by Romans, while endeavouring to crown his brother Godfrey the Bearded as Holy Roman emperor. He remains the most recent pope to take the pontifical name "Stephen".

== Family ==
Christened Frederick, he was a younger brother of Godfrey the Bearded, Duke of Lorraine, and part of the Ardennes-Verdun dynasty that played a prominent role in the politics of the period. Another older brother, Duke Gothelo II of Lower Lorraine, died in 1046. His younger sister, Regelinde, married Count Albert II of Namur. Another sister, Oda, married Count Lambert II of Louvain. Frederick's youngest sister, Mathilda, was married to Count Palatine Henry I of Lotharingia. The family had strong ties to the abbey of St. Vanne.

== Pre-papal career ==
Frederick held a canonry in St. Lambert's Cathedral in Liège and then became the archdeacon. In 1049, or perhaps 1051, he met Pope Leo IX, and was invited to Rome. He was appointed cardinal-deacon of Santa Maria in Domnica by Leo IX. He was also appointed "bibliothecarius et cancellarius", in succession to Odo, the primicerius of Toul, who was named a bishop, and whose latest signature as chancellor is on 16 January 1051. Frederick appears as a signatory to papal documents from 9 March 1051 to 21 December 1053.

=== Travels ===
As chancellor, Frederick's duties in preparing and issuing papal documents, especially bulls, required his constant attendance on the pope. He therefore followed Leo in various travels. He participated in the pope's southern journey from May to August 1052; he signed a bull at S. Germano on 20 May 1052, and on 1 July he was in Benevento. He attended Leo in his trip to Germany, where the pope met with Emperor Henry III, and attempted to reconcile him with King Andrew I of Hungary; they were at Bamberg with the emperor, on 18 October, when Frederick signed a bull, and spent Christmas in Worms. During their return journey, Bishop Peter of Le Puy was consecrated at Ravenna on 14 March 1053, and Chancellor Frederick signed the certificate of consecration.

The return from Germany had a purpose behind it. Along with Frederick came his brother Godefroy, and numerous troops. Pope Leo, who had negotiated an agreement with the Byzantine catepan of Italy, Argyros, was planning a war against the Normans, which was launched in April 1053. Argyrus proved to be no help at all. The papal forces, filled with Germans, suffered a disastrous defeat at Civitate in the Capitanata on 18 June 1053. The pope and his cardinals were driven out of their refuge in Civitate, and forced to sue for peace. They were seized by the Normans and conveyed to Benevento, where he was installed by 23 June. The pope remained in custody all winter, not setting out for Rome until 12 March 1054.

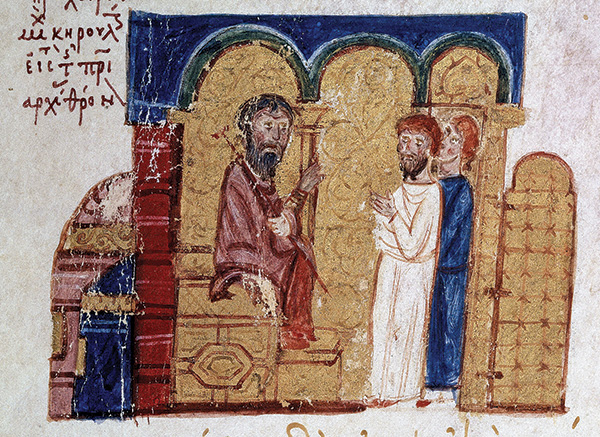
Patriarch Michael enthroned, Madrid Skylitzes

Frederick was with Leo throughout the campaign against the Normans until he was appointed to the embassy to Constantinople. On 28 May 1053, he was at the monastery of Montecassino, on 10 June at Sale, and on 18 June at Civitate.

In January 1054, the chancellor Frederick was appointed, along with Cardinal Humbert of Silva Candida and Archbishop Pietro of Amalfi, to a legation from Pope Leo IX to the Emperor Constantine Monomachos. Their purpose was to persuade the emperor to come to the aid of the pope, join forces with Henry III, and destroy the Normans. When the legates reached Constantinople, they were hospitably received by the emperor and stayed at the imperial palace for some time. Negotiations between them, Patriarch Michael Cerularius of Constantinople, and Archbishop Leo of Ohrid, however, did not succeed. Pope Leo died during the negotiations, on 19 April 1054. On 16 July 1054, Cardinal Humbert placed the bull of excommunication of the patriarch and archbishop on the high altar of Hagia Sophia. Cardinal Frederick discharged the function of one of the three papal legates participating in the events that led to the East-West Schism. When the legates announced their intended departure, the emperor bestowed upon them, in honor of their work, imperial gifts, as well as substantial gifts to the Holy See.

=== Refuge ===
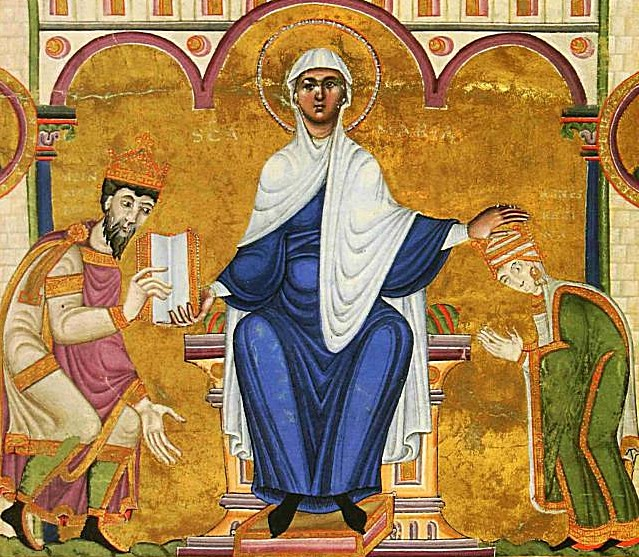
Emperor Henry III and Empress Agnes kneeling before the Virgin Mary, Speyer Evangeliary

Frederick apparently brought back a substantial amount of additional money (pecunia) with him from Constantinople, sufficient to bring suspicion upon him on the part of Emperor Henry III. In November 1054, the emperor named Gebhard of Dollnstein-Hirschberg as the next pope, and the latter was enthroned as Victor II on 13 April 1055. Frederick was back at the papal chancellery in 1055, but, when the Emperor visited Italy in the summer of 1055, he commanded that Victor arrest Frederick and send him to the German court immediately. Frederick sought refuge at Montecassino late in 1055, where he became a monk of the Order of St. Benedict. To escape the imperial and papal agents, with the abbot's permission, he withdrew to the Island of Termiti in the Adriatic, off the port of Termoli.

In August 1056, Pope Victor, harassed by political problems on all sides, travelled to Germany to consult with and gain help from Emperor Henry. He was received by the emperor at Goslar on 8 September, and was with him at Bodfeld on 21 September; but, on 5 October 1056, Henry died. He was buried at Speyer on 21 October. Shortly thereafter, the imperial court was at Aachen, where the pope enthroned Henry III's six-year-old son Henry IV. A reconciliation between the Lorrainers and the imperial family became possible. At a meeting in Cologne in December, the pope reconciled Count Baldwin V of Flanders and Duke Godfrey of Lorraine, Frederick's brother, to Empress Agnes, widow of Henry III and regent for their son Henry IV.

=== Abbacy ===
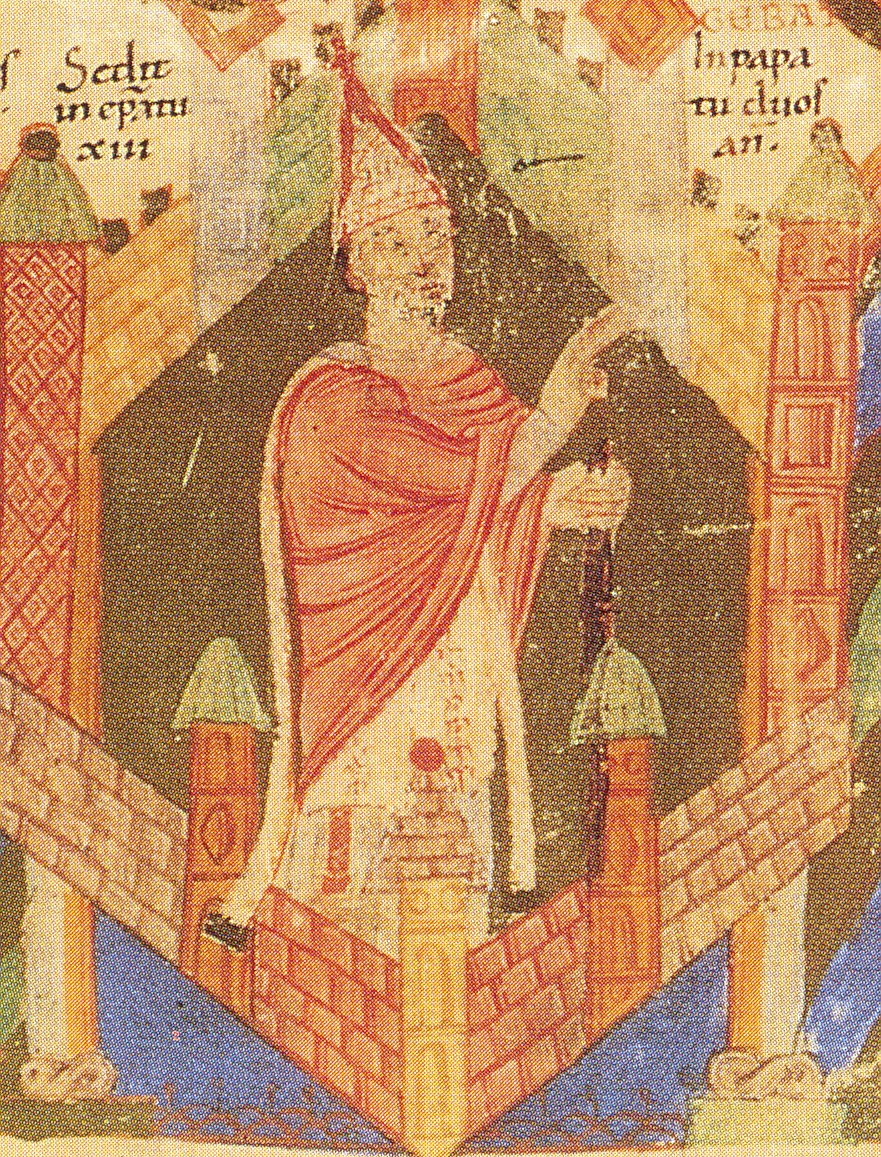
Pope Victor in the Pontifical of Gundekar

Pope Victor was annoyed by the fact that, following the death of Abbot Richer of Montecassino in December 1055, the papacy had not been consulted in the selection of his successor, Abbot Peter. The situation was made worse by dissensions inside the community, and reports to the pope of various alleged misdoings. Official attempts to justify the traditional procedure of election of abbots did not satisfy the reforming agenda of Roman officials. In May 1057, shortly after Pentecost, Cardinal Humbert of Silva Candida, sent as papal legate, began a series of investigations at the monastery. On 22 May he persuaded Abbot Peter to resign. And on 23 May, in a chapter meeting of all of the brothers, presided over by Cardinal Humbert, they began to elect a new abbot; the successful candidate was Cardinal Frederick of Lorraine, who was a monk of Montecassino. Ten days after his election, he and Cardinal Humbert proceeded to the papal court, which was in Tuscany at the time. He was consecrated the thirty-sixth abbot of Montecassino by Pope Victor on 24 June 1057, and ruled for a little over ten months. He obtained for his abbey the privilege of being seated ahead of all other abbots at synods, and for the abbots of Montecassino the privilege of wearing the sandals and dalmatic at religious ceremonies.

On 14 June 1057, Frederick was promoted to the position of cardinal-presbyter of San Crisogono by Victor. Frederick took part in a synod at Arezzo on 23 July, and then began the return journey to Montecassino. He reached Rome, where he took possession of S. Crisogono, his titular church, and took up residence at the Benedictine house, the Pallaria, on the Palatine Hill. Pope Victor died at Arezzo on 28 July, while Frederick was still in Rome.

== Papacy ==
News of Victor's death was brought to Rome by Cardinal Boniface of Albano on 31 July. For the rest of that day, and all the next day, the clergy and populace of Rome discussed what to do next, and specifically whether they should proceed to a papal election. From their discussions, five names emerged as viable candidates: Cardinal Humbert, Cardinal Giovanni of Velletri, Bishop Ottcharius of Perugia, Cardinal Pietro of Tusculum (Frascati), and Hildebrand, the subdeacon of the Roman Church. None of these seemed quite satisfactory, and they compelled Cardinal Frederick to leave his refuge at S. Maria in Pallaria and attend their assembly at the Basilica of S. Peter in vinculis. On 2 August 1057, Frederick was chosen to become the new pope. He took the name Stephen IX. He was escorted to the Lateran Palace, and next day escorted to St. Peter's Basilica, where he was crowned.

=== Church discipline ===
As pope, Stephen enforced the policies of the Gregorian Reform. He held several synods in Rome from August to November 1057, focusing most vigorously on the importance of clerical celibacy. He held a synod at the Lateran Basilica in which he remarked that the Eastern Church tradition allowed priests, deacons, and subdeacons to marry, but the Western Church did not.

Stephen visited the monastery at Montecassino from 30 November 1057 to 10 February 1058. He was still its abbot, and remained so until his death. There he immediately began a program of reform, by every means at his disposal, persuading, exhorting and haranguing the monks to rid themselves of the lax practices that had crept in over the years. He even banned the use of Ambrosian chant, mandating the sole use of the Gregorian chant. In December 1057, he was so ill with "the Roman fever" that he believed he was going to die.

In regional politics, Stephen ordered the bishops of England not to seek consecration from Archbishop Stigand of Canterbury, who was excommunicated and usurping the archbishopric.

=== Secular politics ===
Italy in the 11th century

Stephen was planning for the expulsion of the Normans from southern Italy. At some point in 1057 or 1058, he held a synod in which the citizens of Capua, the capital of the Norman principality, and a cleric named Lando were excommunicated. In order to advance his aims in the south, he decided, at the beginning of 1058, to send a delegation to the new Byzantine Emperor Isaac I Komnenos (1057–1059). The legates were Cardinal Stephen, the Benedictine abbot of the monastery of Ss. Andrea e Gregorio in Rome; Cardinal Mainard, a Benedictine monk of Montecassino; and Desiderius, the Benedictine abbot-elect of Montecassino. The delegates left Rome and reached Byzantine-held Bari. But there they heard a report that Stephen IX had died, and so the mission was abandoned.

After his recovery from his fever, Pope Stephen returned to Rome, and on 8 March 1058, consecrated Bishop Alfanus I of Salerno. In mid-March, he ordered the provost of Montecassino to collect all of the gold and silver of his church and secretly send it immediately to Rome; the pope promised that he would soon return it, with interest. Despite their deep distress, the monks complied, sending the provost with the gold and silver to the pope. The provost was on his way home when the pope called him back and returned Montecassino's treasure. Pope Stephen, however was relieved, by force on the part of the Romans, of the treasure which he had brought to Rome from Constantinople. The pope was planning the elevation of his brother to the imperial throne. For this purpose, and, if the Roman annals are to be believed, out of anger at being plundered, he set out on a journey to Tuscany, planning to crown and lead his brother back to Rome, and from there march against the Normans. Before he departed Rome, the pope summoned a meeting of the bishops, clergy, and people of Rome, and strictly commanded them (sub districta nimis interdictione constituit) that if he should die before the return of the subdeacon Hildebrand from the imperial court, they should on no account proceed to the election of a pope, but await Hildebrand's return.

As he was travelling from Rome to Florence by way of Arezzo, Pope Stephen conceived of the idea of visiting Abbot John Gualbert at Vallombrosa Abbey. He asked for an interview, and John refused, naming illness as his excuse. The pope asked a second time, and received a second refusal. The pope then moved on to Florence without the two ever having come face to face.

== Death and burial ==
Stephen IX died at Florence on 29 March 1058. He was attended at his deathbed by Abbot Hugh of Cluny. The Roman annals report that he was given poison on the journey to Florence by an agent of the Romans. The Romans also asserted that Duke Godfrey, the pope's brother, had dispatched 500 troops and money to regain control of Rome, which motivated the Romans to act.

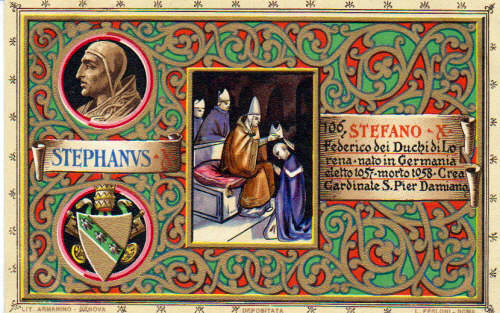
Stephen IX on a 19th-century religious card

Stephen's funeral and burial was held in the Church of Santa Reparata, at Florence, which was demolished in 1357 to make way for the construction of the new cathedral, Santa Maria del Fiore. During the excavations his tomb and incorrupt body, still wearing papal vestments, was discovered next to the altar of S. Zenobio, and identified by an inscription as well as pontifical insignia with which he had been clothed. The present whereabouts of the remains is unknown. Members of his chapel, which he had brought along from Montecassino, were afraid to return through Rome, and were therefore escorted back to their monastery by Florentine soldiers.

Stephen IX was succeeded by Nicholas II, whose rival Benedict X, who was condemned at the Synod of Sutri the same year. The Liber Pontificalis reports a vacancy of the papal throne of nine months and eight days after the death of Stephen IX.

== Sources ==
- Bloch, Herbert (1986). Monte Cassino in the Middle Ages. Vol. 1. Roma: Edizioni di Storia e Letteratura.
- Despy, G. (1953). "La carrière lotharingienne du pape Étienne IX," in: Revue belge de philologie et d’histoire, XXXI (1953), pp. 955–972. (in French)
- Gregorovius, Ferdinand (1896). History of the City of Rome in the Middle Ages. Vol. IV, Part I. London: G. Bell & sons. pp. 92–111.
- Jaffé, Philippus (1885). Regesta pontificum Romanorum ab condita Ecclesia ad annum post Christum natum MCXCVIII (in Latin). Vol. Tomus primus (second ed.). Leipzig: Veit. pp. 529–556.
- Kehr, Paulus Fridolinus (1935). Italia pontificia. Vol. VIII: Regnum Normannorum – Campania Berlin: Weidmann. (in Latin)
- Kelly, J. N. D. and Walsh, M. J. (2010). Oxford Dictionary of Popes. 2nd ed. Oxford: Oxford University Press. pp. 149–150.
- Mann, Horace Kinder (1910). The Lives of the Popes in the Early Middle Ages. Vol. VI: 1049–1073. London: Kegan Paul, Trench, Trübner. pp. 183–225.
- Mann, Horace Kinder (1912). "Pope Stephen (IX) X" . Catholic Encyclopedia. Vol. 14.
- Robert, Ulysse (1892). Un pape belge: histoire du pape Étienne X. (in French). Bruxelles: Société belge de librairie.
- Schmale, F.-J. (1963). "Étienne IX," in: Dictionnaire d’histoire et de géographie ecclésiastiques, Vol. XV, Paris 1963, coll. 1198–1203. (in French)
- Siecienski, Anthony Edward (2010). The Filioque: History of a Doctrinal Controversy. Oxford University Press. ISBN 978-0195372045.
- Wattendorff, Julius (1883). Papst Stephan IX (in German). Paderborn: Schöningh.
- Watterich, I. M. (1862). Pontificum Romanorum qui fuerunt inde ab exeunte saeculo IX usque ad finem saeculi XIII vitae (in Latin). Vol. Tom. I. Leipzig: Engelmann. pp. 188–202.
