= Azymite =

Eastern Orthodox Church term of reproach

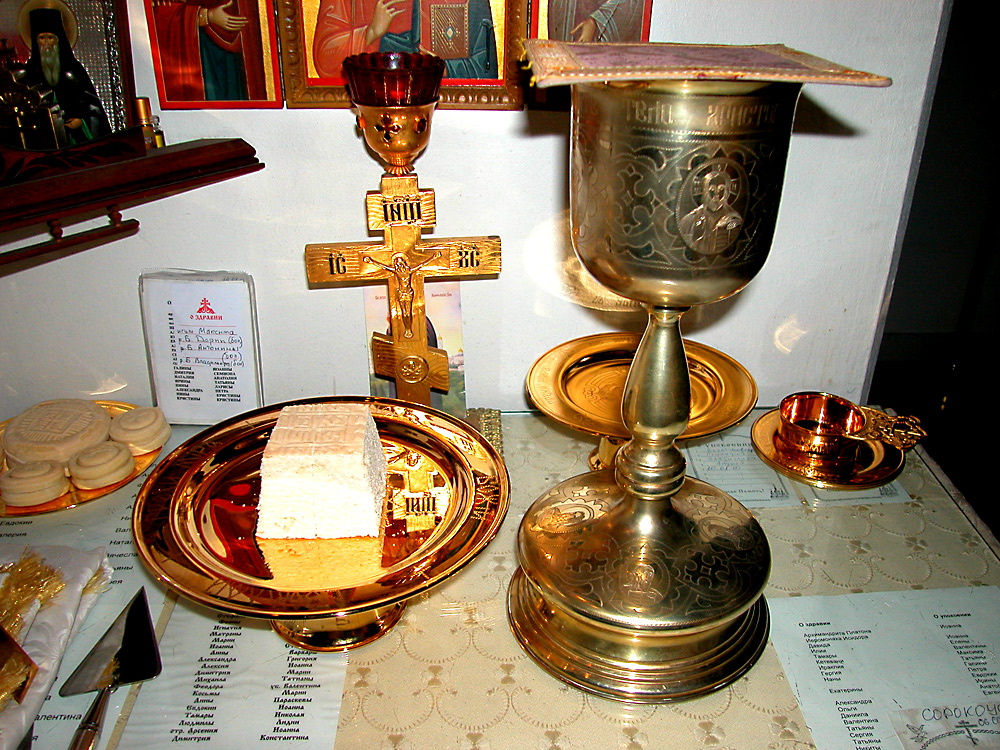
The table of oblation at an Eastern Orthodox church prepared for the Divine Liturgy, with a piece of leavened bread visible on the left, the center of the Azymite controversy.

Azymite (from Ancient Greek ázymos, "unleavened bread") is a term of reproach used by the Eastern Orthodox Church since the 11th century against the Latin Church, which together with the Armenians and Maronites celebrates the Eucharist with unleavened bread. Some Latin controversialists responded by assailing the Greeks as Fermentarians and Prozymites.

The canon law of the Latin Church, the largest particular church of the Catholic Church, mandates the use of unleavened bread for the Host, and unleavened wafers for communion. On the other hand, most Eastern churches explicitly forbid the use of unleavened bread (Greek: azymos artos) for the Eucharist. They associate unleavened bread with the Old Testament and allow only for bread with yeast, as a symbol of the resurrection of Christ (since yeast is the agent that makes leavened bread rise). This controversy is one of three points of contention (along with Petrine supremacy and the Filioque) traditionally accounted as causes of the Great Schism.

== Azymes ==
"Azymes" (plural of azyme) is an archaic English word for the Jewish matzah, derived from the Ancient Greek word ἄζυμος (ἄρτος) ázymos (ártos), "unleavened (bread)", for unfermented bread in Biblical times; the more accepted term in modern English is simply unleavened bread or matzah, but cognates of the Greek term are still used in many Romance languages (Spanish pan ácimo, French pain azyme, Italian azzimo, Portuguese pão ázimo and Romanian azimă). The term does not appear frequently in modern Bible translations, but was the usual word for unleavened bread in the early Catholic English Douay–Rheims Bible.

== History ==
The Western Church has always maintained the validity of consecration with either leavened bread or unleavened bread. Whether the bread which Jesus used at the Last Supper was leavened or unleavened is the central question giving rise to this issue. Various arguments exist for which kind was used. Regarding the usage of the primitive Church, knowledge is so scant, and the testimonies so apparently contradictory, that many theologians have pronounced the problem incapable of definitive solution.

In the ninth century the use of unleavened bread had become universal and obligatory in the West, while the Greeks, desirous of emphasizing the distinction between the Jewish and the Christian Pasch, continued the exclusive offering of leavened bread. Photius made no use of a point of attack which occupies a prominent place in later Orthodox polemics. The western explanation is that Photius saw that the position of the Latins could not successfully be assailed. Two centuries later, the quarrel with Rome was resumed by a patriarch who was not deterred by this consideration. As a visible symbol of Catholic unity, it had been the custom to maintain Greek churches and monasteries in Rome and some of Latin Rite in Constantinople. The issue became divisive when the provinces of Byzantine Italy which were under the authority of the Patriarch of Constantinople were forcibly incorporated into the Church of Rome following their invasion by the Norman armies, said churches which were forced by Rome to use unleavened bread.

In response, Michael Cerularius ordered all the Latin churches in the Byzantine capital to be closed, and the Latin monks to be expelled.

Patriarch Michael Cerularius was responding to a concrete situation within his territory – the persecution of the Byzantine Italians in southern Italy, the closing of their churches, the prohibition of their Rite, the removal of their bishops and the imposition of the Latin unleavened bread for the Eucharist. This enforced change in the Byzantine provinces of southern Italy (which brought about the extinction of the Byzantine traditions there) caused anti-Italian riots in Constantinople; the Patriarch subsequently closed the Latin churches in the imperial city.

As a dogmatic justification of this act, the Patriarch advanced the novel tenet that the unleavened oblation of the "Franks" was not a valid Mass. The proclamation of war with the Pope and the West was drawn up by his chief lieutenant, Leo of Achrida, metropolitan of the Bulgarians. It was in the form of a letter addressed to John, Bishop of Trani, in Apulia, at the time subject to the Byzantine emperor, and by decree of Leo the Isaurian attached to the Eastern Patriarchate. John was commanded to have the letter translated into Latin and communicated to the Pope and the Western bishops. This was done by the learned Benedictine, Cardinal Humbert, who happened to be present in Trani when the letter arrived. Baronius has preserved the Latin version; Cardinal Hergenröther discovered the original Greek text:

The love of God and a feeling of friendliness impelled the writers to admonish the Bishops, clergy, monks and laymen of the Franks, and the Most Reverend Pope himself, concerning their azyms and Sabbaths, which were unbecoming, as being Jewish observances and instituted by Moses. But our Pasch is Christ. The Lord, indeed, obeyed the law by first celebrating the legal pasch; but, as we learn from the Gospel, he subsequently instituted the new pasch.... He took bread, etc., that is, a thing full of life and spirit and heat. You call bread panis; we call it artos. This from airoel (airo), to raise, signifies a something elevated, lifted up, being raised and warmed by the ferment and salt; the azym, on the other hand, is lifeless as a stone or baked clay, fit only to symbolize affliction and suffering. But our Pasch is replete with joy; it elevates us from the earth to heaven even as the leaven raises and warms the bread, ...

This validity of the etymological reasoning with the terms artos from airo was and is disputed. The Latin divines found a number of passages in Scripture where unleavened bread is designated as artos. Cardinal Humbert recalled the places where the unleavened loaves of proposition are called artois. In the Septuagint, one can find the expression άρτους αζύμους [artous azymous] in Exod. 29:2.

Cerularius found the issue politically useful in his conflict with the Latins. In popular opinion, the flour and water wafers of the "Franks" were not bread; their sacrifices were invalid; they were Jews not Christians. Their lifeless bread could only symbolize a soulless Christ; therefore, they had clearly fallen into the heresy of Apollinaris. The controversy became a key factor in producing the East–West Schism, which persists to this day. This question of azyms brought forth a cloud of pamphlets, and made a deeper impression on the popular imagination than the abstruse controversy of the Filioque. But it caused little or no discussion among the theologians at the Councils of Lyons and Florence. At the latter Council the Greeks admitted the Latin contention that the consecration of the elements was equally valid with leavened and unleavened bread; it was decreed that the priests of either rite should conform to the custom of their respective Church.

Modern Russians have claimed for their nation the initiation of the azymes controversy; but the treatises ascribed to Leontius, Bishop of Kiev, who lived a century earlier than Cerularius, and in which all the well-known arguments of the Greeks are rehearsed, are judged to have proceeded from a later pen.

== See also ==
- Arbanaška vera
- Nshkhar, the communion bread used during mass in the Armenian Church
