= Michael I Cerularius =

Ecumenical Patriarch of Constantinople from 1043 to 1058

Michael I of Constantinople
- Ecumenical Patriarch of Constantinople
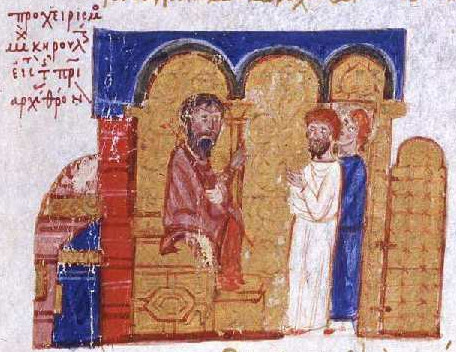
- The enthronement of Michael I, from the Madrid Skylitzes
- See: Constantinople
- Installed: 25 March 1043
- Term ended: 2 November 1058
- Predecessor: Alexius of Constantinople
- Successor: Constantine III of Constantinople

Personal details
- Born: Michael Cerularius c. 1000 Constantinople, Byzantine Empire
- Died: 21 January 1059 (aged c. 59) Constantinople, Byzantine Empire
- Denomination: Eastern Orthodoxy
- Residence: Constantinople

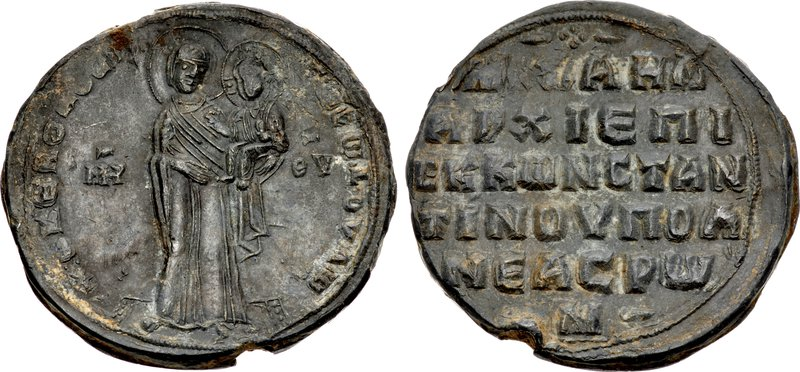
Lead seal of Michael I as Ecumenical Patriarch of Constantinople

Michael I of Constantinople (born Michael Cerularius; Greek: Μιχαὴλ Κηρουλάριος, romanized: Mikhaḕl Keroulários; c. 1000 – 21 January 1059) was the Ecumenical Patriarch of Constantinople from 1043 to 1059. His disputes with Pope Leo IX over church practices in the 11th century played a role in the events that led to the Great Schism in 1054.

== Background ==
Michael Cerularius was born in Constantinople around 1000 and joined the Church at a young age.

== Schism ==
Michael I quarreled with Pope Leo IX over church practices in which the Roman Church differed from Constantinople, particularly the use of unleavened bread in the Eucharist. Dissenting opinions were also exchanged over other theological and cultural issues, ranging from the issue of papal supremacy in the Church to the Filioque clause and other disagreements between the patriarchates.

In 1054, Pope Leo IX sent a letter to Michael I, citing a large portion of the Donation of Constantine believing it genuine:

The first pope who used it [the Donation] in an official act and relied upon it, was Leo IX; in a letter of 1054 to Michael Cærularius, Patriarch of Constantinople, he cites the "Donatio" to show that the Holy See possessed both an earthly and a heavenly imperium, the royal priesthood.

Some scholars say that this letter of September 1053, was never actually dispatched, but was set aside, and that the papal reply actually sent was the softer but still harsh letter Scripta tuae of January 1054.

Pope Leo IX assured Michael I that the donation was completely genuine, not a fable or old wives' tale, arguing that only the apostolic successor to Peter possessed primacy in the Church.

This letter of Pope Leo IX, addressed both to Patriarch Michael I and to Archbishop Leo of Ohrid, constituted a response to a letter which Archbishop Leo had sent in 1053 to Bishop John of Trani in Apulia and which categorically attacked customs of the Latin Church that differed from those of the Greek Church. Especially criticised were the Roman traditions of fasting on the Saturday Sabbath and consecration of unleavened bread. Leo IX in his letter accused Constantinople of historically being a center of heresies (referring to Nestorius, Acacius, Sergius I, John VII and other patriarchs who at various points supported Arianism, Monothelitism and iconoclasm) and claimed in emphatic terms the primacy of the bishop of Rome over the patriarch of Constantinople. In the light of the memory of the saeculum obscurum being fresh, Michael I would have none of it. It can be argued that in 1054, Michael's letter to Leo IX initiated the events which followed because it claimed the title "Ecumenical patriarch" and addressed Pope Leo IX as "brother" rather than "father".

Pope Leo IX sent an official delegation on a legatine mission to meet with Michael I. Members of the papal delegation were Cardinal Humbert of Silva Candida, papal secretary Frederick of Lorraine, and Archbishop Peter of Amalfi. Soon after their arrival in Constantinople, news was received that Pope Leo IX had died on 19 April. Since the official position and authority of papal legates was dependent upon the pope who authorised them to represent him, the news of Leo IX's death placed his envoys in an awkward position. In spite of this, they decided to proceed with their mission, but even before any religious discussions were held, problems arose regarding some basic formalities and ceremonies. During the initial audience, Michael I refused to meet with papal envoys in their official capacity and left them waiting with no further audience for months.

During that time, from April to July 1054, Cardinal Humbert and his colleagues continued with their activities in Constantinople, taking part in informal religious discussions on various issues. This was seen as inappropriate by Patriarch Michael I. Despite the fact that their legatine authority officially ceased after the pope's death, Cardinal Humbert and his colleagues decided to engage in open dispute with the patriarch. On Saturday, 16 July 1054, they produced a charter of excommunication (lat. charta excommunicationis), directed against Patriarch Michael I, Archbishop Leo of Ohrid, and all of their followers. On the same day, Cardinal Humbert and his colleagues entered the church of the Hagia Sophia during the divine liturgy and placed the charter on the altar.

Soon after that, the patriarch decided to react. On 20 July 1054, a synod of 21 metropolitans and bishops was held in Constantinople, presided over by Michael I. The council decided to excommunicate Cardinal Humbert and his colleagues. Only the three men were anathematised, and a general reference was made to all who support them - there was no explicit excommunication of the entire Western Christianity, or of the Church of Rome. On Sunday 24 July, the conciliar anathema was officially proclaimed in the Hagia Sophia Church.

The events of 1054 caused the East–West Schism and led to the end of the alliance between the Byzantine emperors and the Popes. Later popes allied with the Normans against the Byzantine Empire. Patriarch Michael I closed the Latin churches in his area, which exacerbated the schism.

== Later developments ==
Pope Gregory XVI referred to Cerularius, "before the schism", as one of the main teachers of the Christian gospel and its precepts among the Slavs, contesting a Hussite and broader Protestant view that saw Constantinople as the bringer of the gospel.

In 1965, the 11th century excommunications were rescinded by Pope Paul VI and Patriarch Athenagoras following their 1964 meeting in Jerusalem.

Although the excommunication delivered by Cardinal Humbert was invalid, the 1965 gesture represented a significant step towards restoring communion between Rome and Constantinople.

== Byzantine politics ==
The short reign of the Empress Theodora Porphyrogenita then saw Michael I intriguing against the throne. Michael Psellos notes that while their initial relations had been cordial, once Theodora took the throne, they entered into open conflict, as Michael I "was vexed because the Roman Empire was being governed by a woman", and on this topic "he spoke his mind freely". The historian suggests that Theodora would have deposed Michael I for his open effrontery and sedition, had she lived longer.

Michael I had a hand in negotiating the abdication of Theodora's successor, Michael VI Bringas, convincing him to step down on 31 August 1057, in favour of the rebellious general Isaac I Komnenos, for whom the army declared on 8 June, and whom his nephew Constantine Keroularios supported. The emperor duly followed the patriarch's advice and became a monk. Having had a role in bringing him to the throne, Michael I soon quarrelled with Isaac I over confiscation of church property. Michael I went so far as to take the highly symbolic step of donning the purple shoes ceremonially reserved for the emperor. Michael I apparently planned a rebellion, intending to overthrow Isaac I and claim the throne for himself or for his relative Constantine Doukas. Isaac I exiled Michael I to Proconnesus in 1058 and, as Michael I refused to step down, had Michael Psellos drew up accusations of heresy and treason against him. Michael I died before coming to trial. Soon after in the same year his maternal niece became Empress Eudokia Makrembolitissa.

== Bibliography ==
- Charanis, Peter (1969) [1955]. "The Byzantine Empire in the Eleventh Century". A History of the Crusades. Vol. 1 (2nd ed.). Madison: University of Wisconsin Press. pp. 177–219. ISBN 978-0-299-04834-1.
- Migne's Patrologia Latina, Vol. 143 (cxliii), Leo IX Epistolae Et Decreta .pdf – 1.9 Mb. See Col. 744B-769D (pp. 76–89) for Leo IX's letter.
- Mansi, Giovanni Domenico, ed. (1774). Sacrorum conciliorum nova et amplissima collectio. Vol. 19. Venetia: Antonius Zatta.
- Michael Psellus, Fourteen Byzantine Rulers (The Chronographia), E.R.A. Sewter, trans, New York, Penguin Books, 1966.
- Siecienski, Anthony Edward (2010). The Filioque - History of a Doctrinal Controversy. Oxford University Press. ISBN 978-0-19-537204-5.
- Skylitzes, John; (John Wortley, trans. and J-C. Cheynet, notes), Cambridge University Press, 2010.

Eastern Orthodox Church titles
Preceded by Alexius	Ecumenical Patriarch of Constantinople; 1043 – 1058	Succeeded by Constantine III
