= Arbanaška vera =

Arbanaška vera (Serbian for 'Albanian faith') was a 14th-century Serbian antonomasic denunciation of Catholic Albanians in Shkodër, Zeta, Kosovo, Macedonia and other regions modern day Northern Albania.

In the Dušan's Code, the Albanians were mentioned as "Latin believers", "heretic Latins", or "non-believers". The term Arbanaška vera was first used by Pjetër Bogdani in 1685 in his Cvnevs Prophetarum when he mentioned the "shkietë" (Slavs) and used the Arbanaška vera to describe the Albanian faith. The term helped create a necessary differentiation of Christian Albanian culture throughout the centuries. Other similar ethnonyms for the Albanians were "Arbanaš", "arbanaški", "jezik" or "latins" as it is mentioned in the year 1300 in the village of Shën Gjergj to Skopje. Serbian historian Dimitrije Bogdanović writes that Andrea Bogdani, nephew of Pjeter, wrote in 1662 a report to the Propagation of the Faith mentioning that the core of the Catholics in Serbia are the Albanians and that the Catholic faith in Serbia is called "Arbanaska vera".

Albanian archeologist and historian Edi Shukriu writes that the existence of the denunciation proves that the Albanians at the time were subjects of an ethnocultural assimilation policy initiated by the Serbian medieval state. In 1927, Midhat Frashëri published an article in the Albanian paper Dituria where he writes that the Serbian medieval despots used to denounce the Catholic faith as "Arbanaska vera". In Latin, the term was "La fede albanese". Lutfi Aliu writes that the term may also be another word for the Albanian besa. The denunciation was common in Montenegro as an expression when describing Albanian Catholics.
