= Pope Leo IX =

Head of the Catholic Church from 1049 to 1054

Pope Saint Leo IX
- Bishop of Rome
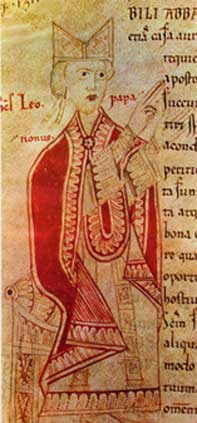
- Miniature of Leo IX contained in an illuminated manuscript of the 11th century
- Church: Catholic Church
- Papacy began: 12 February 1049
- Papacy ended: 19 April 1054
- Predecessor: Damasus II
- Successor: Victor II
- Previous post: Bishop of Toul (1026–49)

Personal details
- Born: Bruno von Egisheim-Dagsburg; 21 June 1002 Egisheim, Alsace, Duchy of Swabia, Holy Roman Empire
- Died: 19 April 1054 (aged 51) Rome, Papal States

Sainthood
- Feast day: 19 April
- Venerated in: Catholic Church
- Canonized: 1082 by Pope Gregory VII

Pope Leo IX (Italian: Leone IX, German: Leo IX.; born Bruno von Egisheim-Dagsburg; 21 June 1002 – 19 April 1054) was the Bishop of Rome and ruler of the Papal States from 12 February 1049 to his death in 1054. Leo IX is considered to be one of the most historically significant popes of the Middle Ages; he was instrumental in the precipitation of the Great Schism of 1054, considered the turning point in which the Catholic and Eastern Orthodox Churches formally separated.

Leo IX favoured traditional morality in his reformation of the Catholic Church. One of his first public acts was to hold the Easter synod of 1049; he joined Emperor Henry III in Saxony and accompanied him to Cologne and Aachen. He also summoned a meeting of the higher clergy in Reims, in which several important reforming decrees were passed. At Mainz, he held a council at which the Italian and French as well as the German clergy were represented, and ambassadors of the Byzantine emperor were present. Here too, simony and clerical marriage were the principal matters dealt with. He is regarded as a saint by the Catholic Church; his feast day is celebrated on 19 April.

== Early life ==
Bruno was the youngest son of Count Hugh IV of Nordgau and Hedwig of Dagsburg. He was a native of Egisheim, Upper Alsace (present-day Alsace, France). His father was a first cousin of Conrad II, Emperor of the Holy Roman Empire. At the age of five, Bruno was committed to the care of Berthold, Bishop of Toul, who had a school for the sons of the nobility.

Hagiographic sources state that when Pope Leo IX was born, "his body [was] marked all over with little red crosses". Some authors have considered this to be a form of the stigmata.

In 1017, Bruno became a canon at St. Stephen's in Toul. When, in 1024, his cousin Conrad succeeded Henry II as emperor, Bruno's relatives sent him to the new king's court "to serve in his chapel".

Bruno was a deacon in 1026 when Conrad set out for Italy to make his authority respected in that portion of his dominions, and as Herimann, Bishop of Toul, was too old to lead his contingent into the peninsula, he entrusted the command of it to Bruno. While he was thus in the midst of arms, Bishop Herimann died, and Bruno was at once elected to succeed him. Conrad, who destined him for higher things, was loath to allow him to accept that insignificant see. But Bruno induced the emperor to permit him to take the see. Consecrated in 1027, Bruno administered the Diocese of Toul for over twenty years, during a time of stress and trouble. He had to contend not merely with famine, but also with war, to which, as a frontier town, Toul was much exposed. Bruno rendered important political services to Conrad II, and afterwards to Emperor Henry III. He knew how to make peace, and, if necessary, to wield the sword in self-defence. Sent by Conrad to Robert the Pious, he established so firm a peace between France and the empire that it was not again broken even during the reigns of the sons of both Conrad and Robert. On the other hand, he held his episcopal city against Count Odo II of Blois, a rebel against Conrad, and "by his wisdom and exertions" added Burgundy to the empire.

Bruno became widely known as an earnest and reforming ecclesiastic by the zeal he showed in spreading the rule of the order of Cluny. It was whilst he was bishop that he was saddened by the death not merely of his father and mother, but also of two of his brothers. Bruno found some consolation in music, in which he proved himself highly proficient.

== Papacy ==
On the death of Pope Damasus II in 1048, Bruno was selected as his successor by an assembly at Worms in December. Both the emperor and the Roman delegates concurred. However, Bruno apparently favoured a canonical election and stipulated as a condition of his acceptance that he should first proceed to Rome and be freely elected by the voice of the clergy and people of Rome. Setting out shortly after Christmas, he met with abbot Hugh of Cluny at Besançon, where he was joined by the young monk Hildebrand, who afterwards became Pope Gregory VII; arriving in pilgrim garb at Rome in the following February, he was received with much cordiality, and at his consecration assumed the name Leo IX.

=== Theology ===
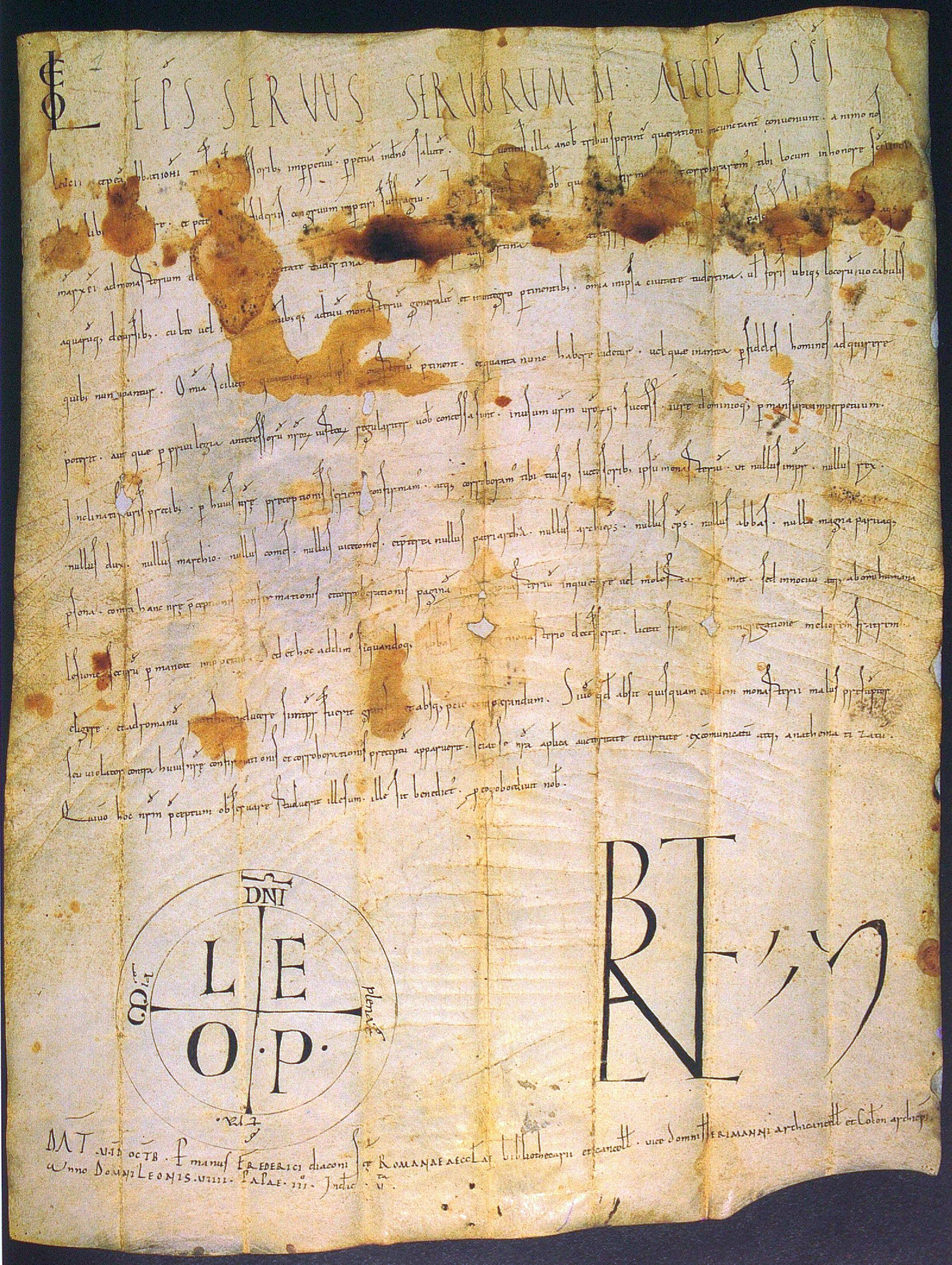
1051 charter of Leo IX

Leo IX favoured celibacy for the clergy in his reformation of the Catholic Church. One of his first public acts was to hold the well-known Easter synod of 1049, at which celibacy of the clergy (down to the rank of subdeacon) was required anew. Also, the Easter synod was where the pope at least succeeded in making clear his own convictions against every kind of simony. The greater part of the year that followed was occupied by one of those progresses through Italy, Germany and France which form a marked feature in Leo IX's pontificate. After presiding over a synod at Pavia, he joined Henry III in Saxony and accompanied him to Cologne and Aachen. He also summoned a meeting of the higher clergy in Reims in which several important reforming decrees were passed. At Mainz, he held a council at which the Italian and French as well as the German clergy were represented, and ambassadors of the Byzantine emperor were present. Here too, simony and the marriage of the clergy were the principal matters dealt with.

After his return to Rome, Leo held another Easter synod on 29 April 1050. It was occupied largely with the controversy about the teachings of Berengar of Tours. In the same year he presided over provincial synods at Salerno, Siponto and Vercelli, and in September revisited his native Germany, returning to Rome in time for a third Easter synod at which the question of the reordination of those who had been ordained by simonists was considered. In 1052, he joined the emperor at Pressburg and vainly sought to secure the submission of the Hungarians. At Regensburg, Bamberg and Worms, the papal presence was celebrated with various ecclesiastical solemnities. In early 1053, Leo arbitrated a dispute between the archbishop of Carthage and the bishop of Gummi over ecclesiastical precedence.

=== Relations with Constantinople ===
Patriarch Michael I Cerularius of Constantinople, through Leo of Ohrid, Archbishop of Bulgaria, wrote to the pope denouncing the use of unleavened bread and fasting days in the Latin Church. Leo IX sent a letter to Michael I in 1054, citing a large portion of the Donation of Constantine, believing it was genuine.

Leo assured Michael that the donation was completely genuine, not a fable, so only the apostolic successor to Peter possessed that primacy and was the rightful head of all the Church. Before his death, Leo IX had sent a legatine mission under Cardinal Humbert of Silva Candida to Constantinople to negotiate with Patriarch Michael Cerularius in response to his actions concerning the Church in Constantinople. Humbert quickly disposed of negotiations by delivering a bull excommunicating the Patriarch. This act, although legally invalid due to the pope's death at the time, was answered by the patriarch's own bull of excommunication against Humbert and his associates and is popularly considered the official split between the Eastern and Western Churches. Afterwards, he closed down the Latin churches of Constantinople, stopped remembrance for the pope in the diptychs, and wrote letters to the other patriarchs against the pope. The patriarch of Antioch, Peter III, rejected most of Michael's accusations against Rome and urged him to compromise. Despite this, the break began the Great East–West Schism.

=== Conflict with the Normans ===
In constant fear of attack from the Normans in the south of Italy, the Byzantines turned in desperation to the Normans' own spiritual chief, Pope Leo IX, and, according to William of Apulia, begged him "to liberate Italy that now lacks its freedom and to force that wicked people, who are pressing Apulia under their yoke, to leave". After a fourth Easter synod in 1053, Leo IX set out against the Norman in the south with an army of Italians and Swabian mercenaries. "As fervent Christians the Normans were reluctant to fight their spiritual leader and tried to sue for peace but the Swabians mocked them—battle was inevitable." Leo IX led the army himself, but his forces suffered total defeat at the Battle of Civitate on 15 June 1053. Nonetheless, on going out from the city to meet the victorious enemy, he was received with every token of submission, pleas for forgiveness and oaths of fidelity and homage. From June 1053 to March 1054, the pope was nevertheless held hostage at Benevento, in honourable captivity, until he acknowledged the Norman conquests in Calabria and Apulia. He did not long survive his return to Rome, where he died on 19 April 1054.

== Selected works ==
- Pope Saint Leo IX (15 August 2023). The Battle of the Virtues and Vices: Defending the Interior Castle of the Soul. TAN Books. ISBN 978-1505131741.

== Sources ==
- Barrow, Julia (2008). "Grades of Ordination and Clerical Careers, c. 900–c. 1200". In Lewis, C. P. (ed.). Anglo-Norman Studies XXX: Proceedings of the Battle Conference 2007. The Boydell Press. pp. 41–61.
- Lower, Michael (2014). "The Papacy and Christian Mercenaries of Thirteenth-Century North Africa". Speculum. 89 (3 July). The University of Chicago Press: 601–631. doi:10.1017/S0038713414000761. S2CID 154773840.
- Robinson, I.S., ed. (2004). The Papal Reform of the Eleventh Century: Lives of Pope Leo IX and Pope Gregory VII. Manchester University Press.
- Theotokis, Georgios (2014). Norman Campaigns in the Balkans, 1081–1108. The Boydell Press.

Catholic Church titles
Preceded by Damasus II	Pope; 1049–1054	Succeeded by Victor II
