= Pope Victor II =

Head of the Catholic Church from 1055 to 1057

- Bishop of Rome
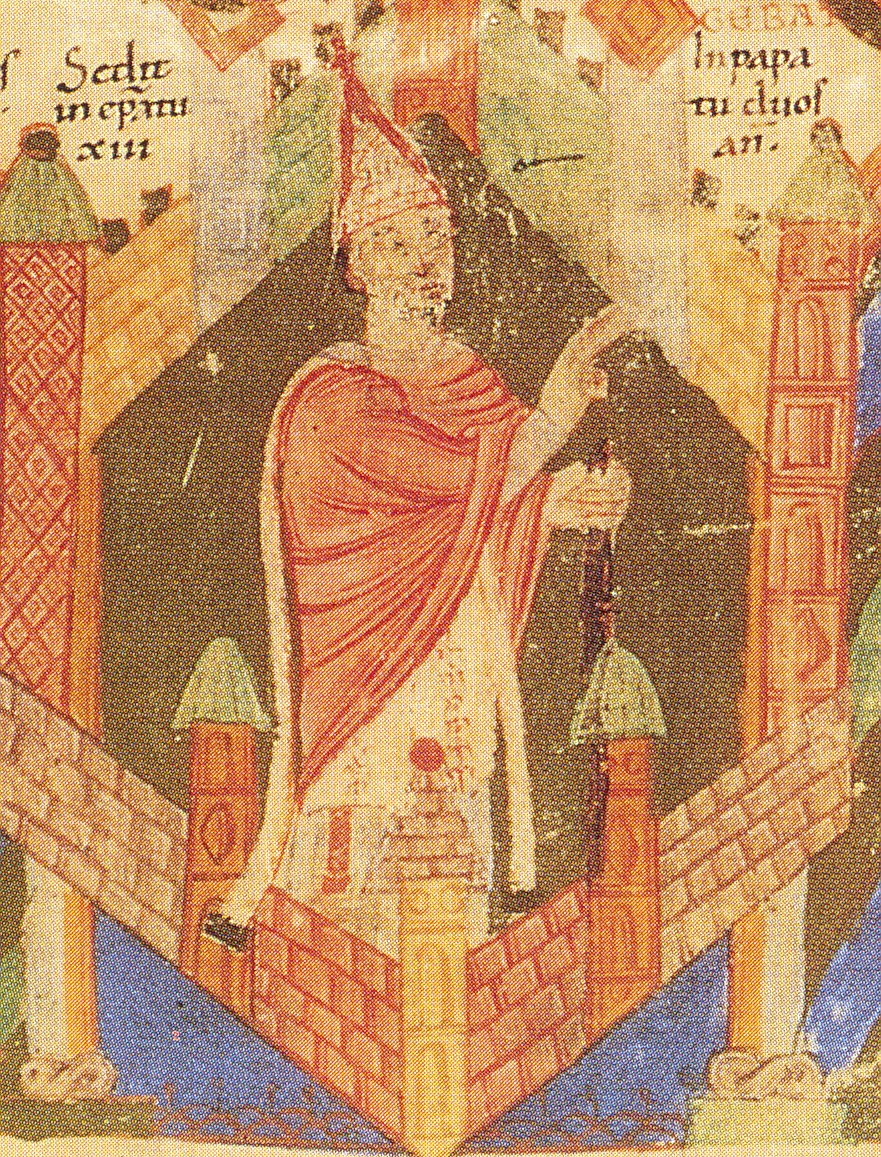
- Gebhard depicted in the Pontifical of Gundekar
- Church: Catholic Church
- Papacy began: 13 April 1055
- Papacy ended: 28 July 1057
- Predecessor: Leo IX
- Successor: Stephen IX

Personal details
- Born: Gebhard von Dollnstein-Hirschberg Germany, Holy Roman Empire
- Died: 28 July 1057 (aged 38–39) Arezzo, Holy Roman Empire

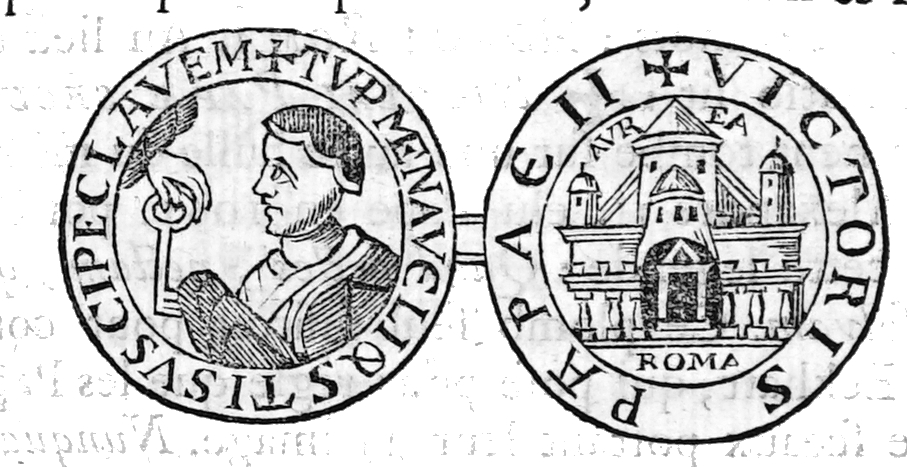
Seal of Victor II

Pope Victor II (c. 1018 – 28 July 1057), born Gebhard von Dollnstein-Hirschberg, was the head of the Catholic Church and ruler of the Papal States from 13 April 1055 until his death in 1057. Victor II was one of a series of German-born popes who led the Gregorian Reform.

== Early life ==
Gebhard was a native of the Kingdom of Germany in the Holy Roman Empire. His place of birth is unknown. He was a son of the Swabian Count Hartwig of Calw and a kinsman of Emperor Henry III. Hartweg's brother, Gotebald, had been a canon of Eichstatt, then Provost of Speyer, Imperial Chancellor for Italy, and, from 1049 to 1063, Patriarch of Aquileia. At the suggestion of the emperor's uncle, Gebhard, Bishop of Ratisbon, the 24-year-old Gebhard was appointed Bishop of Eichstätt. In this position, he supported the emperor's interests and eventually became one of his closest advisors.

== Papacy ==
After the death of Pope Leo IX, a delegation of Roman clergy and people, headed by Hildebrand, later Pope Gregory VII, travelled to Mainz and asked the emperor to nominate Gebhard as successor. At a court Diet held at Ratisbon in March, 1055, Gebhard accepted the papacy, provided that the emperor restore to the Apostolic See all the possessions that had been taken from it. When the emperor agreed, Gebhard, taking the name Victor II, moved to Rome, where, in St. Peter's Basilica on 13 April 1055, he was officially chosen pope by the clergy and hailed by the people; he was immediately enthroned by the cardinals.

By 27 May 1055, Pope Victor was back in Florence, where he was present at the imperial court. On 4 June 1055, the feast of Pentecost, Victor met the emperor at Florence and held a council, attended by some 120 bishops, which reinforced Pope Leo IX's condemnation of clerical marriage, simony, and the loss of the church's properties. He remained in Florence until November 1055. When Henry III returned to Germany, he assigned Pope Victor the powers of Imperial Vicar for Italy, and the task of containing the ambitions of Duke Godfrey of Lorraine, the husband of Beatrice of Tuscany. The pope held the title of dux et marchio.

Victor excommunicated both Count Ramon Berenguer I of Barcelona and Almodis de la Marche for adultery at the behest of Ermesinde of Carcassonne in 1055.

In south Italy, one Teuto and his sons had attacked and were in possession of castles and property which belonged to the bishop of Teramo, who had been dispossessed. Pope Victor sent his count Gerardus to rectify the outrage, and then himself visited Teramo early in July 1056. He held a judicial assize at the castle of La Vitice in the diocese of Teramo, and oversaw the restoration of the bishop and the return of his property. Pope Victor, according to the notary who recorded the proceedings, was acting as Sedis Apostolicae praesul Urbis Romae gratia Dei, Italiae egregius universali p. p. regimine successus, Marcam Firmanam et Ducatum Spoletinum. Later in the summer 1056, the pope travelled to the imperial court again, pro causis papatus, and intending to complain to the emperor because he was being badly treated by the Romans, per Romanos male tractatus. He was with Henry III when he died at Bodfeld in the Harz on 5 October 1056. As guardian of Henry III's infant son Henry IV and adviser of Empress Agnes, Henry IV's mother, Victor wielded enormous power, which he used to maintain peace throughout the empire and to strengthen the papacy against the aggressions of the barons. During the rivalry between Archbishop Anno II of Cologne and other senior clergymen and the empress, Victor backed Agnes and her supporters. Many of her close followers would be promoted, men like Bishop Henry II of Augsburg, who would later become Emperor Henry's nominal regent; several German princes were given high court and church offices.

At the beginning of Lent 1057, Victor and his court began their journey to Rome.

On 18 April 1057, Pope Victor held a general council in the Lateran Basilica. The diocese of the Marsi, which had been divided in two by Pope Benedict IX (Theophylact), was reunited into a single diocese. In the same council, the dispute concerning jurisdiction over a parish between the diocese of Siena and the diocese of Arezzo was heard for the first time.

In May the pope began a trip to Tuscany. He spent eight days in Florence, in conference with Duke Godfrey. Godfrey's position had been greatly strengthened by the death of his enemy the Emperor Henry III the previous autumn, and the pope saw the advantages in a close relationship with the brother of his chancellor, Frederick of Lorraine. The suit between the bishops of Siena and Arezzo resumed during the papal visit, and the pope took the trouble to visit the area of dispute, and talk to parishioners and local aristocracy. He then held a synod at the palace of S. Donato near Arezzo, and issued a bull, assigning the disputed parish to the diocese of Arezzo.

On 14 June 1057, Pope Victor appointed his chancellor, Frederick of Lorraine, to the position of cardinal-presbyter of San Crisogono. Cardinal Frederick took part in a synod at Arezzo on 23 July, and then was consecrated the thirty-sixth abbot of Montecassino by Pope Victor on 24 June 1057.

== Death ==
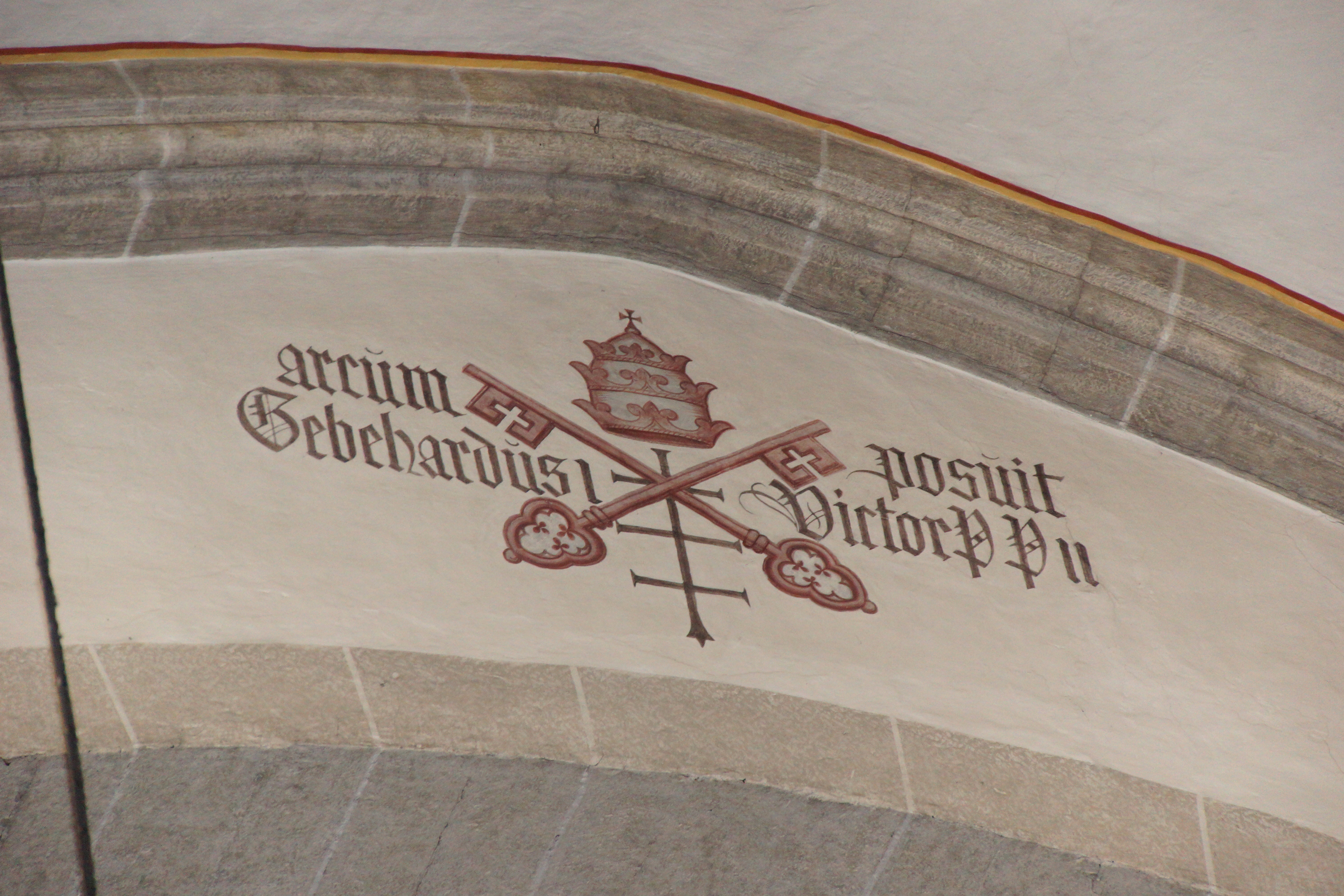
Inscription honouring Victor II in Eichstätt Cathedral

Victor died at Arezzo, on 28 July 1057. He had ruled for two years, three months, and 27 (or 28, or 13) days. His death marked an end to the close relationship shared between the Salian dynasty and the papacy. Victor's retinue wished to bring his remains to the cathedral at Eichstätt for burial. Before they reached the city, however, the remains were seized by some citizens of Ravenna and buried there in the Church of Santa Maria Rotonda, the burial place of Theodoric the Great.

He was the last pope of German origin until Pope Benedict XVI was elected 948 years later.

== See also ==
- List of popes

== Bibliography ==
- Gregorovius, Ferdinand (1896). History of the City of Rome in the Middle Ages. Vol. IV, Part I. London: G. Bell & sons. pp. 92–99.
- Jaffé, Philippus (1885). Regesta pontificum Romanorum ab condita Ecclesia ad annum post Christum natum MCXCVIII (in Latin). Vol. Tomus primus (second ed.). Leipzig: Veit. pp. 549–553.

=== External links ===
- Huschner, Wolfgang (2000). "VITTORE II." Enciclopedia dei Papi (Treccani 2000) (in Italian)
- Huschner, Wolfgang and Andrea Verardi (2020). "VITTORE II, papa." Dizionario Biografico degli Italiani Volume 99 (Treccani: 2020). (in Italian)

Catholic Church titles
| Preceded by Leo IX | Pope; 1055–57 | Succeeded by Stephen IX |
