= Humbert of Silva Candida =

11th-century French Benedictine abbot and cardinal

His eminence Humbert of Silva Candida OSB
- Cardinal-Bishop of Silva Candida
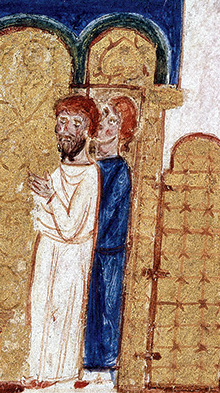
- Church: Catholic Church
- Other post: Archbishop of Sicily

Orders
- Created cardinal: 1050 by Pope Leo IX

Personal details
- Died: 5 May 1061 Rome
- Buried: Lateran Basilica

Humbert of Silva Candida, O.S.B., also known as Humbert of Moyenmoutier (c. 1000 to 1015 – 5 May 1061) was a French Benedictine abbot and later cardinal. It was his act of excommunicating the Patriarch of Constantinople, Michael I Cerularius, in 1054 that is generally regarded as the precipitating event of the East–West Schism between the Roman Catholic Church and the Eastern Orthodox Church.

== Biography ==
When Humbert was 15 years old, his parents sent him to the Abbey of Moyenmoutier in Lorraine as an oblate destined for monastic life according to the Rule of St. Benedict. When he came of age, he entered the Order and was later elected abbot of the monastery. He became friends with Bruno, Bishop of Toul, who was elected Pope Leo IX in 1048 and who brought the monk to Rome to assist him after his election.

Pope Leo appointed Humbert Archbishop of Sicily in 1050. However, the Norman rulers of the island prevented him from landing there. Instead, he was appointed Cardinal-Bishop of Silva Candida the following year. It has been suggested that he was the first Frenchman to be made a cardinal.

Under Leo, Humbert became chief papal secretary, and while traveling in Apulia in 1053, he received from John, Bishop of Trani, a letter from Leo, Archbishop of Ochrid, criticizing Western rites and practices. He translated the Greek letter into Latin and gave it to the Pope, who ordered a reply. This exchange led to Humbert being sent to Constantinople at the head of a legatine mission with Frederick of Lorraine (later Pope Stephen IX), and Peter, Archbishop of Amalfi, to confront the Patriarch Michael Cerularius.

Humbert was warmly received by the Emperor Constantine IX, but was spurned by the Patriarch, because Pope Leo had died on April 19th of that same year, and his death had deprived his representative of any authority: therefore, Michael I refused to meet with papal envoys in their official capacity and left them waiting with no further audience for months. During that time, from April to July 1054, Cardinal Humbert and his colleagues continued with their activities in Constantinople, taking part in informal religious discussions on various issues, something that was seen as inappropriate by Patriarch Michael I: despite the fact that their legatine authority officially ceased after the pope's death, Cardinal Humbert and his colleagues decided to engage in open dispute with the Patriarch. Finally, on 16 July 1054, during the celebration of the Divine Liturgy, Humbert placed a charter of excomunication (lat. charta excommunicationis) against the Patriarch on the high altar of the Cathedral of Hagia Sophia, which some historians have suggested to be invalid because of Leo's death. This event officially crystallized the gradual estrangement of Eastern and Western Christianity that had taken place over the centuries, and is traditionally used to date the beginning of the Great Schism. Soon after that, the patriarch decided to react. On 20 July 1054, a synod of 21 metropolitans and bishops was held in Constantinople, presided over by Michael I. The council decided to excommunicate Cardinal Humbert and his colleagues. Only the three men were anathematised, and a general reference was made to all who support them - there was no explicit excommunication of the entire Western Christianity, or of the Church of Rome. On Sunday 24 July, the conciliar anathema was officially proclaimed in the Hagia Sophia Church.

In his later years, Humbert was appointed librarian of the Roman Curia by Pope Stephen IX, his former legatine companion, and he wrote the reform treatise Libri tres adversus Simoniacos ("Three Books Against the Simoniacs") (1057), which criticized those who bought or sold ecclesiastical offices (simony), including kings, for whom it had been common practice. Humbert's argument that simoniacal ordinations and sacraments were invalid was refuted by Peter Damian. Humbert is also credited as the mastermind behind the 1059 Election Decree, which decreed that popes would henceforth be elected by the College of Cardinals.

He traveled extensively throughout Italy in the later years of his life, in part due to the election of Antipope Benedict X in 1058. He did, however, attend the Lateran Synod in April 1059. Humbert died in Rome on 5 May 1061, and was buried in the Lateran Basilica.

== Bibliography ==
- Charanis, Peter (1969) [1955]. "The Byzantine Empire in the Eleventh Century". A History of the Crusades. Vol. 1 (2nd ed.). Madison: University of Wisconsin Press. pp. 177–219. ISBN 978-0-299-04834-1.
- Norwich, John Julius (1967). The Normans in the South 1016–1130. London: Longman. ISBN 978-0571259649.
- Hüls, Rudolf (1977). Kardinäle, Klerus und Kirchen Roms: 1049–1130 (in German). Tübingen. pp. 133–34. ISBN 978-3484800717.
- Mansi, Giovanni Domenico, ed. (1774). Sacrorum conciliorum nova et amplissima collectio. Vol. 19. Venetia: Antonius Zatta.
