= Herbert Bloch =

- Born: 18 August 1911
- Died: 6 September 2006 (aged 95); Cambridge, Massachusetts, US

Academic background
- Education: University of Berlin; University of Rome

Academic work
- Discipline: Classics
- Institutions: Harvard University

Herbert Bloch (18 August 1911 – 6 September 2006) was a professor of Classics at Harvard and a renowned authority on Greek historiography, Roman epigraphy and archaeology, medieval monasticism, and the transmission of classical culture and literature.

== Life ==
A Jewish native of Germany, Bloch studied Ancient History, Classical Philology and Archaeology at the University of Berlin and at the University of Rome, where he received his Dr. degree in Roman History in 1935 and the Diploma di perfezionamento in 1937. He was awarded a L.L.D. by the University of Cassino in 1989.

He was a member of the staff of the excavations in Ostia in 1938. Because of anti-Semitic legislation in Italy at this time, Bloch emigrated to the United States in 1939. His brother, who stayed in Germany, was murdered in the Holocaust. Bloch taught at Harvard University from 1941 to 1982. His teaching and research interests involved Greek and Roman historiography, Latin epigraphy, Roman archaeology (especially architecture), and Medieval Latin literature.

He was a Member of the Institute for Advanced Study, Princeton, New Jersey (1953–54), Professor in Charge of the School of Classical Studies at the American Academy in Rome (1957–59), Senior Fellow of the Society of Fellows (1964–79), Trustee of the Loeb Classical Library (1964–73). He served as President of the American Philological Association (1968/9) and as President of Fellows of the Medieval Academy of America (1990–93). He was a member of the American Academy of Arts and Sciences, the American Philosophical Society, the Pontificia Accademia Romana di Archeologia (since 1990 Hon. Mem.), The German Archaeological Institute, the Zentraldirektion of the Monumenta Germaniae Historica. He was awarded the Premio "Cultori di Roma" 1999.

He died on 6 September 2006 at Cambridge, Massachusetts.

== Selected works ==
His publications include

- I bolli laterizi e la storia edilizia romana. Contributi all'archeologia e alla storia romana (1936–38), printed as a book in 1948, 2nd ed. 1968
- Supplement to Vol. XV,1 of the Corpus Inscriptionum Latinarum, Including Complete Indices to the Roman Brick-stamps (1948; 2nd ed. 1967); ed. Felix Jacoby, Abhandlungen zur griechischen Geschichtsschreibung (1956)
- "Der Autor der Graphia aureae urbis Romae," Deutsches Archiv für Erforschung des Mittelalters, 40 (1984), pp. 55–175 (slightly enlarged to be published as a book by the Monumenta Germaniae Historica)
- Monte Cassino in the Middle Ages, 3 vols. (1986) (awarded the Praemium Urbis in Rome 1987 and the Haskins Medal of the Medieval Academy 1988)
- The Atina Dossier of Peter the Deacon of Monte Cassino. A Hagiographical Romance of the Twelfth Century published in the series Studi e Testi 346 (1998).

== Sources ==
- Christopher P. Jones, Herbert Bloch. Biographical Memoirs, in Proceedings of the American Philosophical Society, vol. 152, no. 4, December 2008, pp. 533–40
- Mariano Dell'Omo, In Memoriam. Herbert Bloch (1911–2006) storico del medioevo cassinese, in «Benedectina. Rivista del Centro storico benedettino italiano», 53 (2006), pp. 517–523
- Works of Herbert Bloch from the catalogue of the Deutschen Nationalbibliothek
