= Leo of Ohrid =

Byzantine archbishop (died 1056)

- Archbishop of Ohrid
- Native name: Λέων
- Church: Eastern Orthodox Church
- Diocese: Archbishopric of Ohrid
- Installed: 1037
- Term ended: 1056
- Predecessor: John of Debar
- Successor: Theodulus I

Personal details
- Denomination: Eastern Orthodox Christianity
- Residence: Ohrid
- Profession: Theologian

Leo of Ohrid (Greek: Λέων Άχρίδος; died 1056) was a leading 11th-century Byzantine churchman as Archbishop of Ohrid (1037–1056) and advocate of the Ecumenical Patriarchate of Constantinople's views in the theological disputes with the See of Rome, which culminated in the East–West Schism of 1054.

== Life ==
Nothing is known about Leo's early life. Sometime after 1037, he was appointed Archbishop of Ohrid, prior to which he had held the position of chartophylax in the Hagia Sophia in Constantinople.

Under Patriarch Michael Keroularios (1043–59), Leo was sent as the spokesman of Constantinople to theological debates with clergymen representing the Pope of Rome in southern Italy. He reiterated his views in a 1053 letter to the bishop John of Trani, which was however addressed to the Pope and all Latin bishops. In this letter, "Leo for the first time shifted the religious estrangement between East and West toward liturgical and disciplinary issues" (J. Meyendorff), and condemned various practices of the Western Church such as the eating of strangled meat, with blood, the fasting on Saturdays (contrary to the Council of Trullo), or various minor issues of ritual. The most important point of friction, however, was the Western use of unleavened bread (azyma) for celebrating the Eucharist, which provoked a running argument carried out in a series of letters with Cardinal Humbert of Silva Candida, which finally led to Humbert's mission to Constantinople in 1054 and the finalizing of the Great Schism between Rome and the East through their mutual anathemas, resulting in the existence as separate Churches of the Roman Catholic Church and the Eastern Orthodox Church.

== See also ==
- History of the East–West Schism

== Sources ==
- Meyendorff, John (1991). "Leo of Ohrid". In Kazhdan, Alexander (ed.). The Oxford Dictionary of Byzantium. Oxford and New York: Oxford University Press. p. 1215. ISBN 978-0-19-504652-6.
