= Peter Charanis =

American historian

- Παναγιώτης Χαρανής
- Born: Panagiotis Charanis; 1908; Lemnos, Ottoman Greece
- Died: March 23, 1985 (aged 76–77)

Academic background
- Education: Rutgers University (BA); University of Wisconsin-Madison (PhD)

Academic work
- Discipline: Byzantine studies
- Institutions: Rutgers University

Peter Charanis (1908 – 23 March 1985), born Panagiotis Charanis (Greek: Παναγιώτης Χαρανής), was a Greek-born American scholar of Byzantium and the Voorhees Professor of History at Rutgers University. Charanis was long associated with the Dumbarton Oaks research library.

== Biography ==
Charanis was born around 1908 in Lemnos, Ottoman Greece. His exact date of birth is unknown as the documents were burned, he found this 'amusing'. He immigrated to the United States as a pre-teen leaving his family in Lemnos and settling in New Jersey in 1920. He received his bachelor's degree from Rutgers and his doctorate from the University of Wisconsin–Madison, where he studied under Alexander Vasiliev. He continued his studies as a postgraduate in the University of Brussels under the eminent Byzantinist, Henri Grégoire. From 1936 to 1938, he participated in Grégoire's seminar where he met his future wife Madeleine Schiltz and befriended the likes of Nicholas Adontz and Paul Wittek. According to Charanis himself, during his stay in Brussels, he acquired a profound interest in the Armenians. That interest influenced both him and his studies, notably The Armenians in the Byzantine Empire (Byzantinoslavica, 1961) and A Note on the Ethnic Origin of Emperor Maurice (Byzantion, 1965).

Charanis also spent some time at the Aristotle University of Thessaloniki in Greece, and upon his return to the United States joined the Rutgers faculty in 1938, becoming Voorhees Professor of History in 1963. At that time, Byzantine Studies was still at its infancy in the United States. Charanis persuaded the history department to begin a course in Byzantine Studies, which eventually became one of the most popular courses at Rutgers. From 1964 to 1966, he served as chairman of the university's history department. He retired in 1976.

Charanis is known for his anecdotal narrations about Greek Orthodox populations, particularly those outside the newly independent modern Greek state, who continued to refer to themselves as Romioi (i.e. Romans, Byzantines) well into the 20th century. Since Charanis was born on the island of Lemnos, he recounts that when the island was taken from the Ottomans by Greece in 1912, Greek soldiers were sent to each village and stationed themselves in the public squares. Some of the island children ran to see what Greek soldiers looked like. "What are you looking at?" one of the soldiers asked. "At Hellenes," the children replied. "Are you not Hellenes yourselves?" the soldier retorted. "No, we are Romans," the children replied.

== Selected bibliography ==
- "An important short chronicle of the fourteenth century", Byzantion 13 (1938)
- "Byzantium, the West and the origin of the First Crusade", Byzantion 19 (1949)
- "On the Social Structure and Economic Organization of the Byzantine Empire in the Thirteenth Century and Later", Byzantinoslavica 12 (1951)
- "Ethnic Changes in the Byzantine Empire in the Seventh Century", Dumbarton Oaks Papers 13 (1959)
- Charanis, Peter (1969) [1955]. "The Byzantine Empire in the Eleventh Century". A History of the Crusades. Vol. 1 (2nd ed.). Madison: University of Wisconsin Press. pp. 177–219. ISBN 9780299048341.
- "The Armenians in the Byzantine Empire", Byzantinoslavica 22 (1961), Repr. Lisbon, 1963, London, 1972
- "Observations on the Demography of the Byzantine Empire", XIII International Congress of Byzantine Studies, Oxford, 1966
