= Peter, Duke of the Romans =

Duke of the Romans

Peter was a medieval Roman noble. Like his father, he carried the title of Romanorum patricius, consul, dux et senator ("Patrician, consul, duke, and senator of the Romans"), implying his secular command over Rome and its militia. He was the son of Alberic III, Count of Tusculum and a descendant of Theophylact I, Count of Tusculum.

Historians use the term Saeculum obscurum to describe the period when the Papacy was under the direct control of the Roman nobility, particularly under the domination of the family of Theophylact, which later became the Colonna family.

== Family tree ==
Theophylact I, Count of Tusculum; 864–924	Theodora
Hugh of Italy; 887-924-948 (also married Marozia)	Alberic I of Spoleto d. 925; HOUSE OF TUSCULUM	Marozia; 890–937	Pope Sergius III; 904–911
Alda of Vienne	Alberic II of Spoleto; 905–954	David or Deodatus	Pope John XI; 931–935
Gregory I, Count of Tusculum	Octavian; Pope John XII; 955–964	Pope Benedict VII; 974-983
Theophylact; Pope Benedict VIII; Pope 1012–1024	Alberic III, Count of Tusculum d. 1044	Pope John XIX; Pope 1024–1032
Gregory II, Count of Tusculum	Peter, Duke of the Romans, Count of Tusculum	Guy/Gaius, Count of Tusculum	Octavian, Count of Tusculum	Theophylact; Pope Benedict IX; 1012–1055
Gregory III, Count of Tusculum
Ptolemy I of Tusculum	Peter de Columna; Colonna family

== Sources ==
- George L. Williams. Papal Genealogy: The Families And Descendants Of The Popes
