= Saeculum obscurum =

10th century period of papal electoral corruption

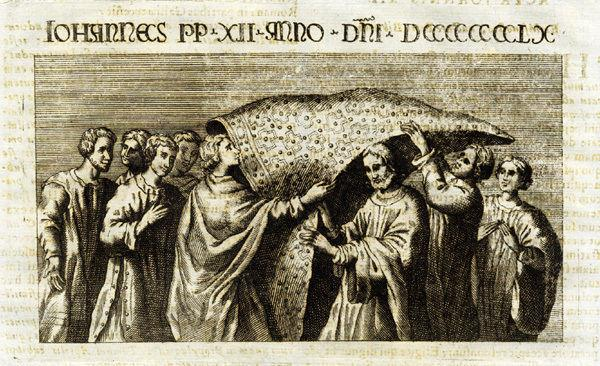
1742 print of the corpse of John XII, one of the most infamous popes, being carried by a crowd

Saeculum obscurum (Ecclesiastical Latin: [ˈsɛː.ku.lu.m obsˈkuː.rum], "the dark age/century"), also known as the Rule of the Harlots or the Pornocracy, was a period in the history of the papacy during the first two thirds of the 10th century, following the chaos after the death of Pope Formosus in 896, and the seven legitimate popes and one illegitimate antipope elected between 896 and 964. It began with the installation of Pope Sergius III in 904 and lasted for 60 years until the death of Pope John XII in 964. During this period, the popes were influenced strongly by a powerful and allegedly corrupt aristocratic family, the Theophylacti, and their relatives and allies. The era is seen as one of the lowest points of the history of the papal office.

== Periodisation ==
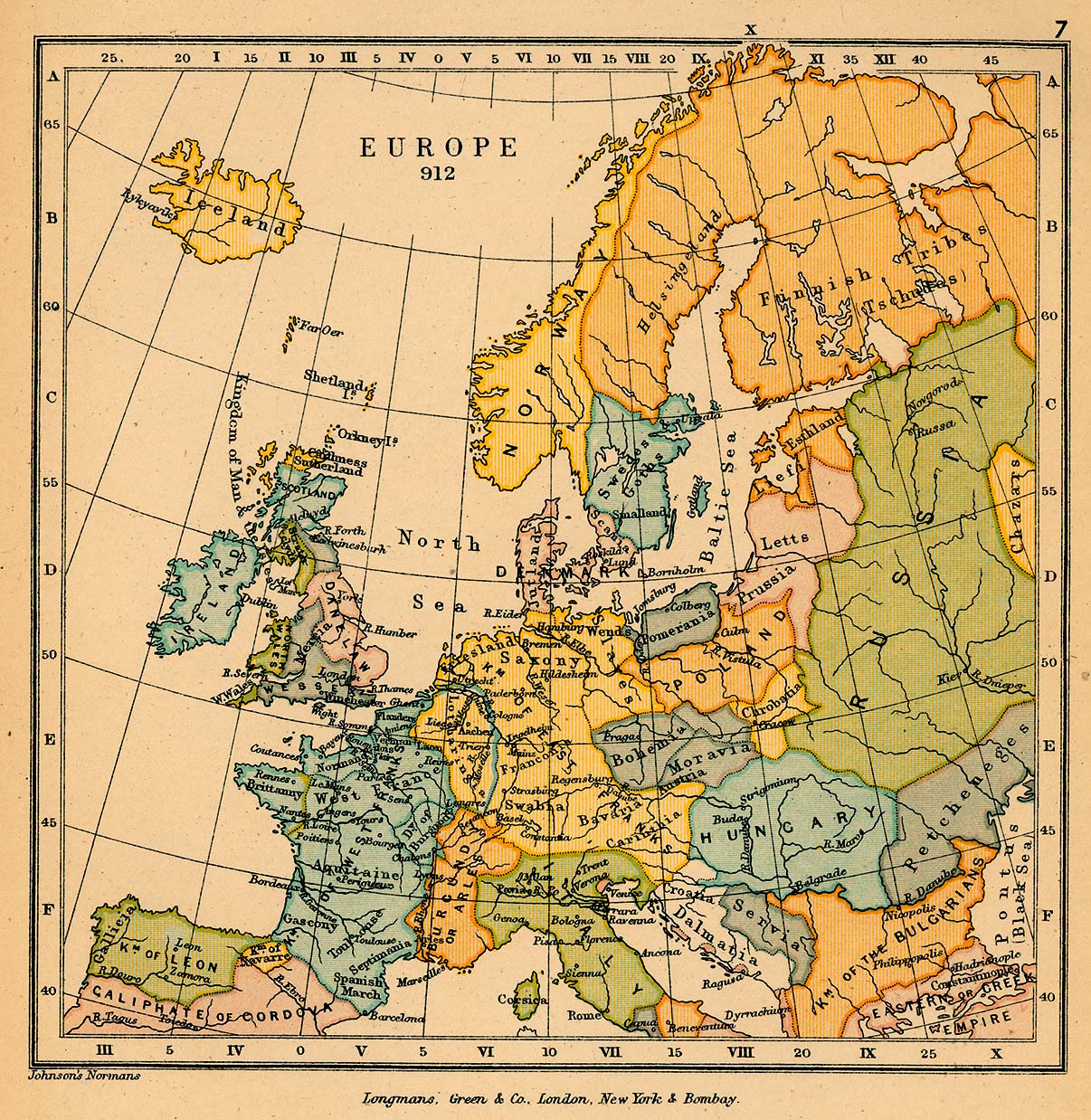
Europe in 912 AD, around the start of the saeculum obscurum

The saeculum obscurum was first named and identified as a period of papal immorality by the Italian cardinal and historian Caesar Baronius in his Annales Ecclesiastici in the 16th century. Baronius's primary source for his history of this period was the contemporaneous writer Bishop Liutprand of Cremona. Baronius himself was writing during the Counter-Reformation, a period of heightened sensitivity to clerical corruption. His characterisation of the early 10th-century papacy was perpetuated by Protestant authors. The descriptors "pornocracy" (German: Pornokratie, from Greek pornokratiā, "rule of prostitutes"), hetaerocracy ("government of mistresses"), and the Rule of the Harlots (German: Hurenregiment), were coined by Protestant German theologians in the 19th century.

Historian Will Durant refers to the period from 867 to 1049 as the "nadir of the papacy".

== 10th-century popes ==
The Theophylacti family were descended from Theophylactus. They held positions of increased importance in the Roman nobility, such as iudex ("judge"), vestararius, gloriosissimus dux ("most-glorious duke"), consul, senator, and magister militum. Theophylact's wife Theodora and daughter Marozia held a great influence over the papal selection and religious affairs in Rome through conspiracies, affairs, and marriages.

Marozia became the concubine of 45-year-old Pope Sergius III when she was 15 and later took other lovers and husbands. She ensured that her son John (who was rumoured to have been fathered by Sergius III) was seated as Pope John XI according to Antapodosis sive Res per Europam gestae (958–962) by Liutprand of Cremona (c. 920–972). Liutprand affirms that Marozia arranged the murder of her former lover Pope John X (who had originally been nominated for office by Theodora) through her then husband Guy of Tuscany, possibly to secure the elevation of her current favourite as Pope Leo VI. There is no record substantiating that Pope John X had definitely died before Leo VI was elected since John X was already imprisoned by Marozia and was out of public view. Judicious historians, even those not noted for Catholic sympathies such as Ferdinand Gregorovius have noted that John X was a victim of posthumous calumny.

Theodora and Marozia held great sway over the popes during this time. In particular, as political rulers of Rome they had effective control over the election of new popes. Much that is alleged about the saeculum obscurum comes from the histories of Liutprand, Bishop of Cremona. Liutprand took part in the Assembly of Bishops which deposed Pope John XII, and was a political opponent of the Roman aristocracy and its control over papal elections. Lindsay Brook writes:

We must be especially circumspect about the writing of Liutprand of Cremona, perhaps the most polemical of the tenth century chroniclers, who had his own agenda to promote the revived western Roman Empire. ... It would be misleading to portray all, or even most, of the popes of the era as worldly and corrupt. Surviving documents (and there are obvious lacunae) make it clear that many were competent administrators, and skilful diplomats in difficult and dangerous times. Some were even reformers, keen to root out discreditable practices such as simony. Others ordered the rebuilding and restoration of Rome's churches and palaces ... Rather, it is the manner of the election of many of them and their symbiotic relationship with the Roman aristocracy that has earned their regime the designation pornocracy.

== List of popes during the saeculum obscurum ==
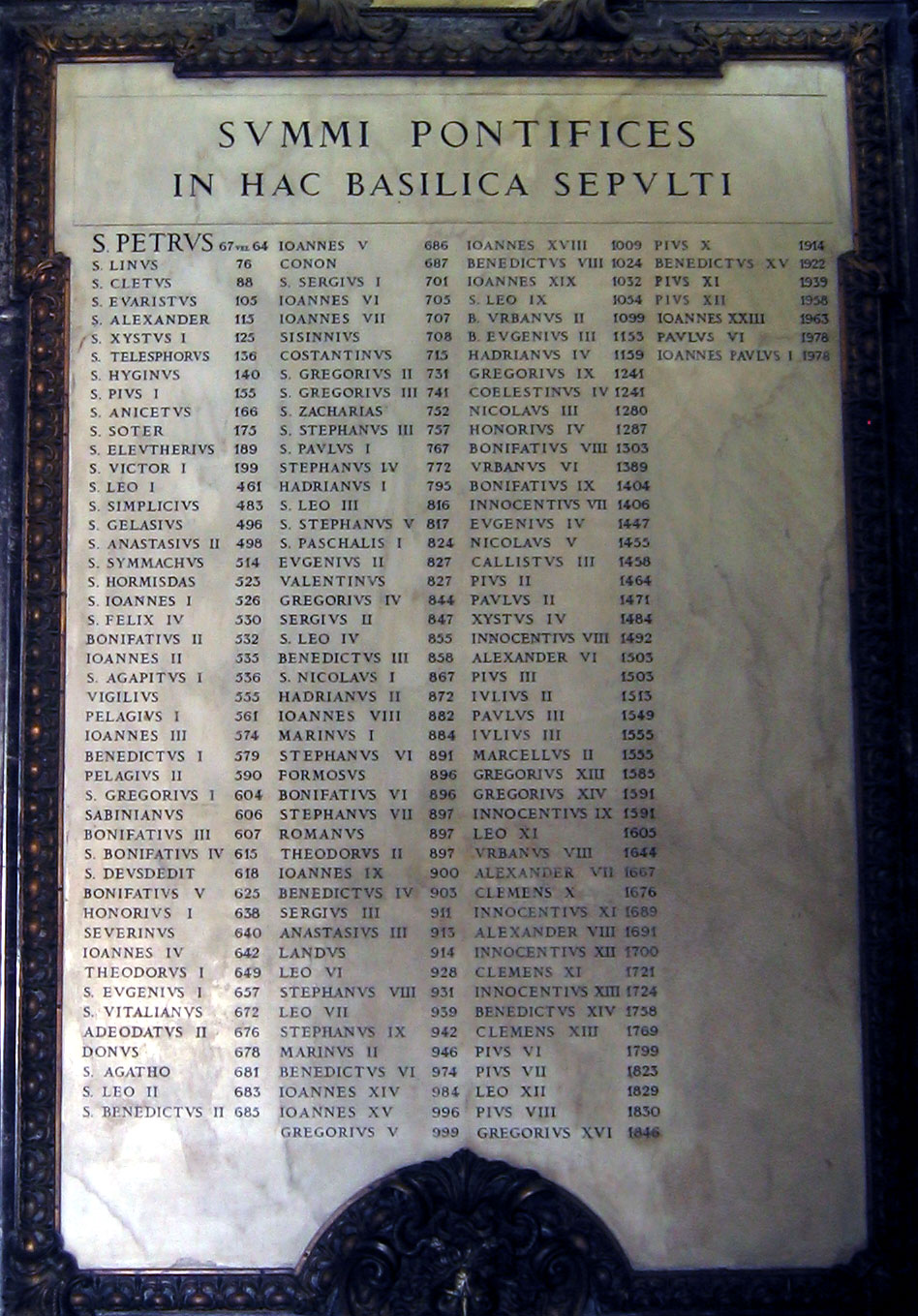
List of popes, including the names of popes of the saeculum obscurum buried in St. Peter's Basilica in the Vatican City. Marble slab at the entrance to Sacristia.

- Pope Sergius III (904–911), alleged lover of Marozia
- Pope Anastasius III (911–913)
- Pope Lando (913–914)
- Pope John X (914–928), alleged lover of Theodora (the mother), allegedly killed by Marozia
- Pope Leo VI (928–928)
- Pope Stephen VII (928–931)
- Pope John XI (931–935), son of Marozia, alleged son of Pope Sergius III
- Pope Leo VII (936–939)
- Pope Stephen VIII (939–942)
- Pope Marinus II (942–946)
- Pope Agapetus II (946–955)
- Pope John XII (955–964), grandson of Marozia, by her son Alberic II of Spoleto

== Family tree ==
Theophylact I, Count of Tusculum; 864–924	Theodora
Hugh of Italy; 887–948 (also married Marozia)	Alberic I of Spoleto d. 925	Marozia; 890–937	(alleged) Pope Sergius III; Pope 904–911	Theodora	John (consul, later bishop)
Alda of Vienne	Alberic II of Spoleto; 905–954	David or Deodatus	Pope John XI; 931–935	Pope John XIII; 965–972	Crescentius the Elder
Maria	Gregory I, Count of Tusculum	Pope John XII; 955–964	Pope Benedict VII; 974–983
Pope Benedict VIII; 1012–1024	Alberic III, Count of Tusculum d. 1044	Pope John XIX; 1024–1032
Peter, Duke of the Romans	Gaius	Octavianus	Pope Benedict IX; 1032–1048	Gregory II, Count of Tusculum

== Tusculan Papacy, 1012–1059 ==
After several Crescentii family popes up to 1012, the Theophylacti still occasionally nominated sons as popes:

- Pope Benedict VIII (1012–1024), son of Count Gregory I
- Pope John XIX (1024–1032), son of Count Gregory I
- Pope Benedict IX (1032–1044, 1045, and 1047–1048), son of Alberic III
- Antipope Benedict X (1058–1059), grandson of Alberic III, driven out of Rome after a small war

Pope Benedict IX went so far as to sell the Papacy to his religious godfather, Pope Gregory VI (1045–1046). Benedict IX then changed his mind, seized the Lateran Palace, and became Pope for the third time in 1047–1048. The Tusculan Papacy was finally ended by the election of Pope Nicholas II – five years after the Great Schism of 1054 – who was assisted by Hildebrand of Sovana against Antipope Benedict X. Hildebrand was elected Pope Gregory VII in 1073 and introduced the Gregorian Reforms, increasing the power and independence of the papacy that would lead to help ignite the First Crusade in about 20 years.

== See also ==
- The Bad Popes
- List of sexually active popes
- Papal appointment
- Pope Joan (fictional; legends about her may have stemmed from stories about the Pornocracy)
