= Counts of Tusculum =

Italian noble family (10th–12th centuries)

Counts of Tusculum Comites de Tusculana
- Original arms of the Counts of Tusculum

- Arms depicted at the Abbey of Saint Mary of Grottaferrata
- Country: Papal States
- Current region: Lazio
- Founded: 10th century
- Founder: Theophylact I, Senator of Rome (Cognatic line); Alberic I, Duke of Spoleto (Agnatic line)
- Final head: Raino
- Seat: Tusculum
- Titles: Pope (non-hereditary); Duke of Spoleto (897–924); Senator of Rome (904–1058)
- Dissolution: After 1179 (Main branch)
- Cadet branches: Colonna; Sant’Eustachio; Counts of Segni (Possibly); Malabranca (Possibly)

The Counts of Tusculum (Italian: Conti di Tuscolo, Latin: Comites de Tusculana), whose earliest members were also known as the Theophylacti (Italian: Teofilatti), were a powerful noble family from Latium that dominated Roman politics between the 10th and 12th centuries. Their principal stronghold was the ancient city of Tusculum, while their influence in Rome centered near the Church of the Twelve Holy Apostles.

The family’s rise to prominence began with their control of important secular and ecclesiastical offices in Rome. The title “Count” appears to have derived initially less from feudal authority over Tusculum itself than from the office of Count Palatine of the Sacred Lateran Palace (Latin: Comes sacri Lateranensis palatii). During the 10th and early 11th centuries, the Tusculan family became the dominant political force in Rome and developed what modern historiography has termed the "noble-papacy", in which the popes were effectively chosen from among the Roman nobility. Several popes and antipopes of the 11th century came from their family. This period also overlapped with the Pornocracy, when influential women connected to the family played a major role in papal politics.

The Counts of Tusculum gave rise to several important noble lineages, most notably the House of Colonna, traditionally descended from Peter, son of Gregory III, Count of Tusculum. Following the extinction of the main Tusculan branch in the late 12th century, only the descendants of Raino, Count of Tusculum survived, forming the Sant’Eustachio family. The Counts of Segni likewise claimed descent from the Counts of Tusculum.

== History ==
=== Early History ===
The earliest known ancestor of the Tusculan family was Theophylact (fl. 826), a nomenclator. (Note: The “nomenclator” was one of the seven major papal offices or positions, whose honorary duty was to inform members of the assembly of the Pope’s invitation to dine at his table during celebrations.) He is thought to have been the grandfather of Theophylact I, (Note: Through his son Gregory, another nomenclator who possibly served as an apocrisiarius to the Byzantine court during the reign of Pope John VIII.) who became the effective ruler of Rome between 904 and c. 922. Through his marriage to the powerful Roman noblewoman Theodora, of Byzantine background, Theophylact I established the political dynasty later known as the Theophylacti. Their daughter Marozia emerged as one of the dominant figures of the Pornocracy and played a decisive role in papal and aristocratic politics during the early 10th century. She was subsequently granted the unprecedented title of senatrix by Pope John X. Marozia was later associated with Alberic I, Duke of Spoleto, with whom she had Alberic II. She was also the mother of Pope John XI, traditionally believed to have been fathered by Pope Sergius III. Alberic II then became the effective ruler of Rome between 932 and 954. Among his sons was Octavian, who became Pope John XII.

The first member of the family explicitly recorded with the title comes de Tusculana ("Count of Tusculum”) was Gregory I. He appears in official documents as senator Romanorum ("Senator of Rome") in 986 and as praefectus navalis ("Naval prefect") in 999. Gregory I had several children, including Alberic III, Theophylact II, and Roman. Two of his sons became popes: Theophylact II became Pope Benedict VIII in 1012, while Roman became Pope John XIX in 1024. Alberic III’s son Theophylact III later became Pope Benedict IX.

Gregory's exact relationship to Alberic II remains uncertain; his connection to the family is uncertain, and he has been variously identified either as a son of Alberic II or, in more recent historiography, as a son of a younger Theophylact, who predeceased his father Alberic II.

=== The Tusculan Papacy ===
Alberic II created a system of government often called the “noble papacy,” in which Rome's aristocracy dominated both secular politics and the selection of popes. Near the end of his life, Alberic II anticipated that this arrangement might not remain stable after his death, particularly due to the potential intervention of Otto I of Saxony. To secure continuity, he arranged for Roman nobles to swear an oath that, following the death of Pope Agapetus II, his son Octavian would be elected pope.

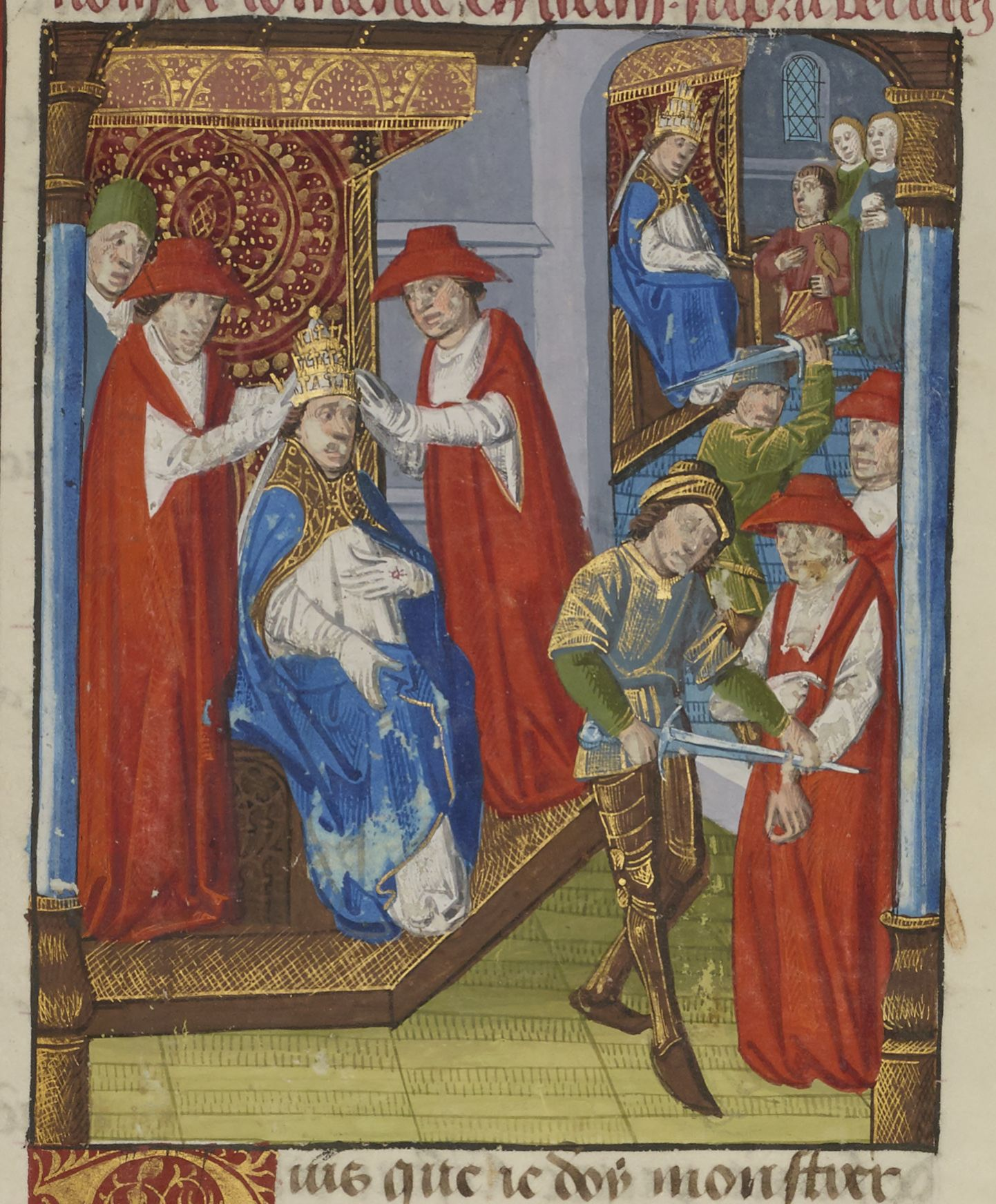
Coronation of Pope John XII from an illustration of Giovanni Boccaccio's De casibus virorum illustrium, c. 1450–1475

After Agapetus II’s death, Octavian succeeded to the papal throne as Pope John XII. He initially allied with Otto I and crowned him Holy Roman Emperor in 962, but the relationship soon deteriorated as both sides accused the other of breaking their agreements and acting against their respective interests in Rome. Tensions escalated when John XII opposed Otto’s growing influence in the city. Otto responded by convening a synod in Rome in 963. The assembly declared John XII deposed on charges brought against him and elected Antipope Leo VIII (Note: Leo VIII claimed the Holy See from 963 until 964 in opposition to John XII and again from 23 June 964 to 1 March 965. He is considered by the Catholic Church to have been an antipope during the first period and the legitimate pope during the second.) as his successor. John XII rejected the decision and continued to assert his authority, but his position was significantly weakened. He died several months after the synod had declared him deposed. Following this, the Crescentii family displaced the earlier Tusculan faction and dominated papal politics in Rome from 974 to 1012, with the exception of 1001-1002, when Gregory I briefly led a revolt and expelled them from Rome. They relied on their position as nobles and on their cooperation with imperial authorities, including Emperor Otto III and the imperial court, which at times resided in Rome.

After the death of Pope Sergius IV in 1012 and the sudden death of John Crescentius, who had attempted to install Antipope Gregory VI, the thirty-year-old Theophylact II secured his election as Pope Benedict VIII, ending the Crescentii’s control over Rome. Benedict strongly asserted papal authority and launched military actions against Crescentii strongholds in and around Rome. His papacy was closely aligned with the imperial policy of Henry II, King of Germany, culminating in his imperial coronation of Henry in 1014. His brother, Pope John XIX, continued this cooperative policy and crowned Conrad II as the first Salian Holy Roman Emperor.

John was succeeded by his young nephew, who became Pope Benedict IX. His pontificate was marked by controversy, political turmoil, and accusations of serious misconduct. Opposition in Rome led to his expulsion in 1044 and the election of Pope Sylvester III. Benedict soon regained power but chose to resign in 1045, allegedly selling the papacy to his godfather, Pope Gregory VI, in exchange for reimbursement of his expenses, making him the only pope ever accused of selling the papacy. He later regretted the decision and attempted to reclaim the papal throne, creating a three-way dispute among Benedict, Sylvester, and Gregory. To resolve the crisis, Henry III, Conrad II's successor, intervened and convened the Council of Sutri, where all three claimants were removed. A new pope, Pope Clement II, was elected in 1046, and subsequently crowned Henry III as Holy Roman Emperor.

Benedict briefly seized power once more in 1047 after the sudden death of Pope Clement II, before being deposed for the third and final time in 1048, thus ending the Tusculan Papacy. In 1058, John, a nephew of Benedict IX, attempted to restore Tusculan control of the papacy by proclaiming himself Pope Benedict X. His claim was subsequently rejected, and he was deposed and condemned as an antipope. In the aftermath of this crisis, Pope Nicholas II implemented significant electoral reforms, establishing new procedures for papal elections that substantially curtailed the influence of the Roman nobility and marked the effective end of the noble-dominated papacy.

=== Later history ===
From 1062 onward, the Counts of Tusculum increasingly aligned themselves with the Holy Roman Emperors in opposition to the reforming papacy in Rome. Leadership of the Tusculani thereafter passed through Alberic III, Gregory II, Gregory III and finally to Ptolemy I. Initially a close supporter of Pope Paschal II, Ptolemy was entrusted in 1108 with the administration of papal estates outside Rome during the pope's absence. Soon afterward, however, he emerged as a leading figure of the imperial faction. Exploiting Paschal's absence, he organized a revolt against the papacy. In 1111 he commanded forces supporting Emperor Henry V during the emperor's expedition in Italy, and in 1116 he defeated papal troops near Mount Algidus.

The same year, Ptolemy's son, Ptolemy II, married Bertha, the illegitimate daughter of Emperor Henry V. Following the death of Ptolemy I in June 1130, Ptolemy II assumed leadership of the family and continued its policy of territorial expansion in the Latin Valley and along the Pontine Marshes. Under his rule the Tusculani reached the height of their power, controlling strategic stretches of both the Via Appia and the Via Latina. By 1140 he had married Tropea, niece of Antipope Anacletus II, whom he supported. Upon Ptolemy II's death in 1153, his son Jonathan became count of Tusculum. Through his mother, Bertha, Jonathan was an imperial vassal, yet in 1155 Pope Adrian IV granted him the papal fortress at Tusculum and invested him as a papal vassal as well. On 9 July 1155 he swore homage to the pope excepto contra Imperatorem ("except against the emperor"). The senate of the Commune of Rome, however, refused to ratify the grant of the fortress. Jonathan died childless sometime before 1167, leaving leadership of the family to his only surviving brother, Raino

By the late 12th century, however, the family had entered a period of gradual decline. Parts of Tusculum had already been ceded to the papacy by members of the Colonna branch of the family, weakening Tusculan independence. In 1167, Raino participated in the Battle of Monte Porzio, allied with the Holy Roman Emperor against the Commune of Rome. Although victorious, he was prevented by the citizens of Tusculum from re-entering the city and was forced to sell his share of Tusculum to Pope Alexander III, who already controlled the other half. The last Count of Tusculum was thus removed from his office. He died sometime after 11 October 1179, bringing the main Tusculan line to an end. (Note: Raino's two surviving sons, Agapito and Ottolino, established the House of Sant'Eustachio, a cadet branch named after Saint Eustace, from whom they erroneously claimed descent.) Tusculum was ultimately destroyed by the army of the Commune of Rome in 1191, after Emperor Henry VI granted permission for the attack in exchange for his coronation as Holy Roman Emperor.

== Coats of arms ==
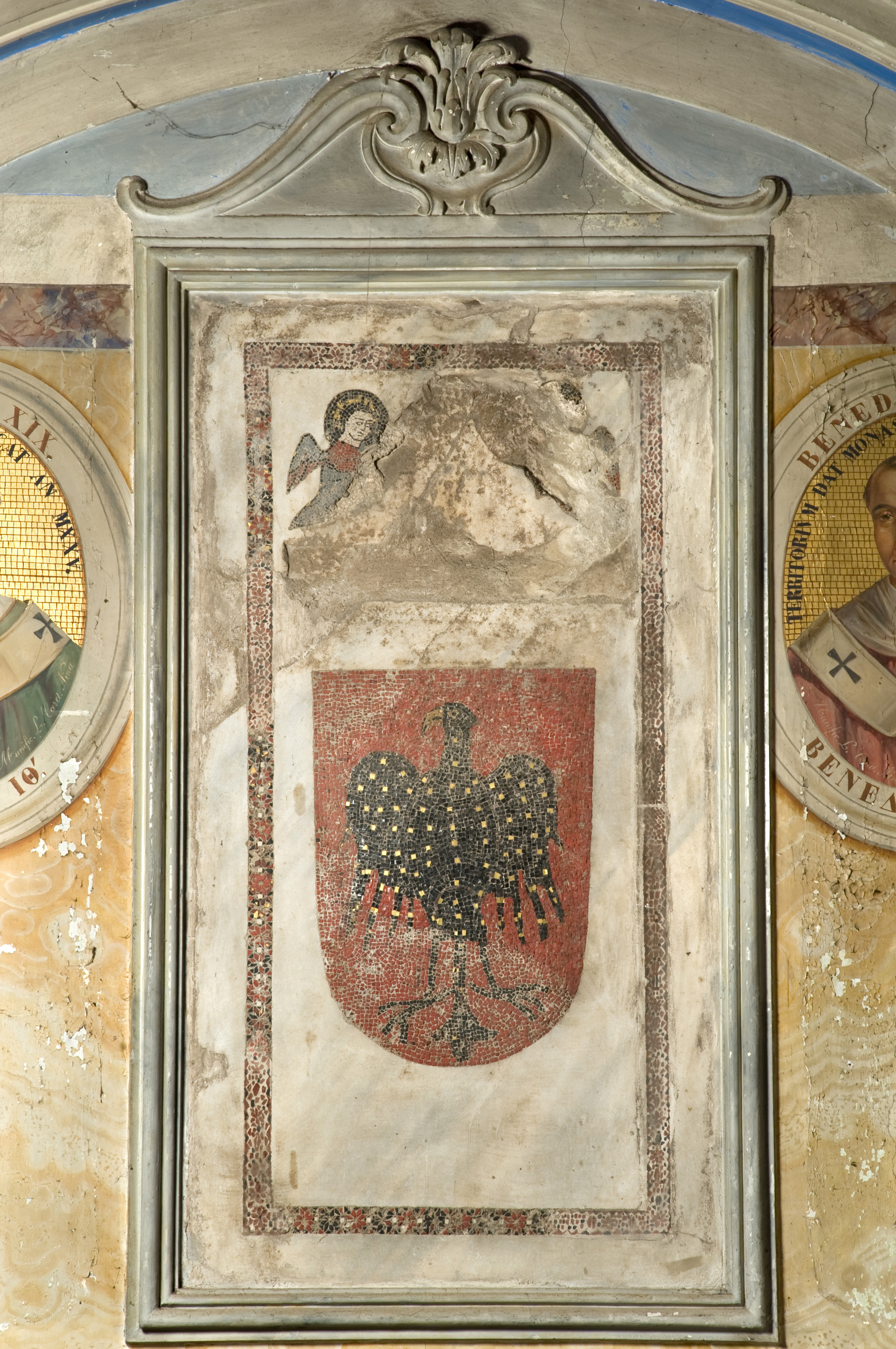
Gravestone of Pope Benedict IX at the Abbey of Saint Mary of Grottaferrata

As heraldry emerged and underwent formal standardization during the 12th century, the Counts of Tusculum only briefly overlapped with the development of this heraldic tradition. Consequently, several armorial attributions have been associated with the family in later sources. The coat of arms most commonly attested in various rolls of arms is emblazoned Or, an eagle displayed Sable (Italian: d’oro all’aquila di nero), occasionally with the eagle depicted crowned.

Additional heraldic evidence has been identified at the Abbey of Saint Mary of Grottaferrata, of which the Tusculani were founders and patrons. These consist of mosaic shields dating from the late 13th century and early 14th century, blazoned Gules, an eagle chequy Or and Sable (Italian: di rosso all'aquila scaccata d'oro e di nero). These arms later appeared in several variant forms; for example, the eagle was sometimes depicted crowned, and in certain versions the chequy pattern used argent instead of or. Such arms, however, are more properly attributable to the Counts of Segni, another family who likewise exercised considerable influence over the abbey. The close resemblance between these arms and those traditionally associated with the Tusculani is likely explained by the Counts of Segni’s claim of descent from the Counts of Tusculum.

Original arms of the Counts of Tusculum

Arms depicted in the Abbey of Saint Mary of Grottaferrata (Or variant)

Arms depicted in the Abbey of Saint Mary of Grottaferrata (Argent variant)

Arms of the Colonna branch

Arms of the Malabranca branch

Arms of the Sant’Eustachio branch

== Counts and their titles ==
This list is partially incomplete in the tenth century and the chronology and dates of the various countships are often uncertain. They were only counts from about 1013, lords before.

- before 924 Theophylact I
- until 924 Alberic I, (Consul) son-in-law of Theophylact I
- 924–954 Alberic II, son of Alberic I
- before 1013 Gregory I, (Excellentissimus vir – Praefectus navalis) son of Alberic II
- until 1012 Theophylact II, son of Gregory I
- 1012–1024 Romanus, (Consul et dux, senator) brother of Theophylact II and son of Gregory I
- 1024–1032 Alberic III, (Imperialis palatii magister Consul et dux – Comes sacri palatii Lateranensis) brother of Theophylact II and Romanus
- 1032–1045 Theophylact III son of Alberic III
- 1044–1058 Gregory II, (Consul, nobilis vir, senator Comes Tusculanensis) son of Alberic III
- 1058 – c. 1108 Gregory III, (Comes Tusculanensis Consul, illustris) son of Gregory II
- c. 1108 – 1126 Ptolemy I (Tolomeo I), (Consul, comes Tusculanus) son of Gregory III
- 1126–1153 Ptolemy II (Tolomeo II), (Illustrissimus, dominus Consul et dux) son of Ptolemy I
- 1153 – c. 1167 Jonathan, (Comes de Tusculano) co-ruler with Raino son of Ptolemy II
- 1153–1179 Raino, (Nobilis vir, dominus) brother of Jonathan, co-ruler with Jonathan

== Tusculan popes ==
- John XI, son of Alberic I, pope 931–935
- John XII son of Alberic II, pope 955–964
- Benedict VII, nephew of Alberic II, pope 974–983
- Benedict VIII, son of Gregory I, pope 1012–1024 (also count)
- John XIX, son of Gregory I, pope 1024–1032 (also count)
- Benedict IX, son of Alberic III, pope 1032–1048 (also count)
- Benedict X, antipope 1058–1059

== Family Tree ==
Many of these family connections and identifications are disputed by historians. Highlighted individuals indicate they whered head of the family for some time.

Theophylact (fl. 826)
Gregory (fl. 880)
House of Theophylacti
Theophylact I (c. 860 - c. 922)
Theophylact (Died before c. 922) | Maria "Marozia" (c. 890 - Before 936) | Sergius (Died young) | Boniface (Died young) | Theodora (?)
John; Pope John XI (c. 907/910 - 935) | Alberic II (c. 912 - 954) | Constantine (?) | Sergius (?) | David (Note: Sometimes called Deodatus.) (?) | Berta (?)
Theophylact (Note: Sometimes enumerated as Theophylact II.) (Died before 954) | Octavian; Pope John XII (c. 930/937 - 964) | Deodatus (?) | Benedict; Pope Benedict VII (? - 983)
House of Conti (di Tuscolo)
Gregory I (? - 1012) | Stephen (Note: Mentonied in a act of appeasement dated to 981) (fl. 981)
Theophylact II; Pope Benedict VIII (c. 980 - 1024) | Roman; Pope John XIX (? - 1032) | Alberic III (? - c. 1033/1044) | Maria "Marozia" (?)
Theophylact III; Pope Benedict IX (c. 1007/1012 - c. 1056) | Gregory II (? - 1058) | Peter (?) | Guy (?) | Octavian (?)
Theodora (?) | John (Died young) | Peter (Note: Italian sources claim that this Peter was the actual founder of the House of Colonna and is said to have lived from c. 1078 to c. 1108/1118. However, based on these dates, it is impossible for him to have been the son of Gregory II, since the latter had died by 1058.) (Died young) | Gregory III (? - 1108) | Peter (?) | Otto (?) | John; Antipope Benedict X (? - 1074/1080) | Conrad (fl. After 1116)
Ptolemy I (? - 1130) | Peter (Died before 1151) | Isdara (?) | Egidius (Died 1137) | Gregory (Died 1128) | House of Malabranca; House of Guidoni
Ptolemy II (? - 1153) | House of Colonna
Jonathan (Died before 1167) | Raino (Died after 1179) | Jordan (Died before 1167)
House of Sant'Eustachio

== Sources ==
- Thietmar of Merseburg – Chronicle
- Ferdinand Gregorovius History of the City of Rome in the Middle Ages (English edition 1894–1902) multi-volume.
