= List of sexually active popes =

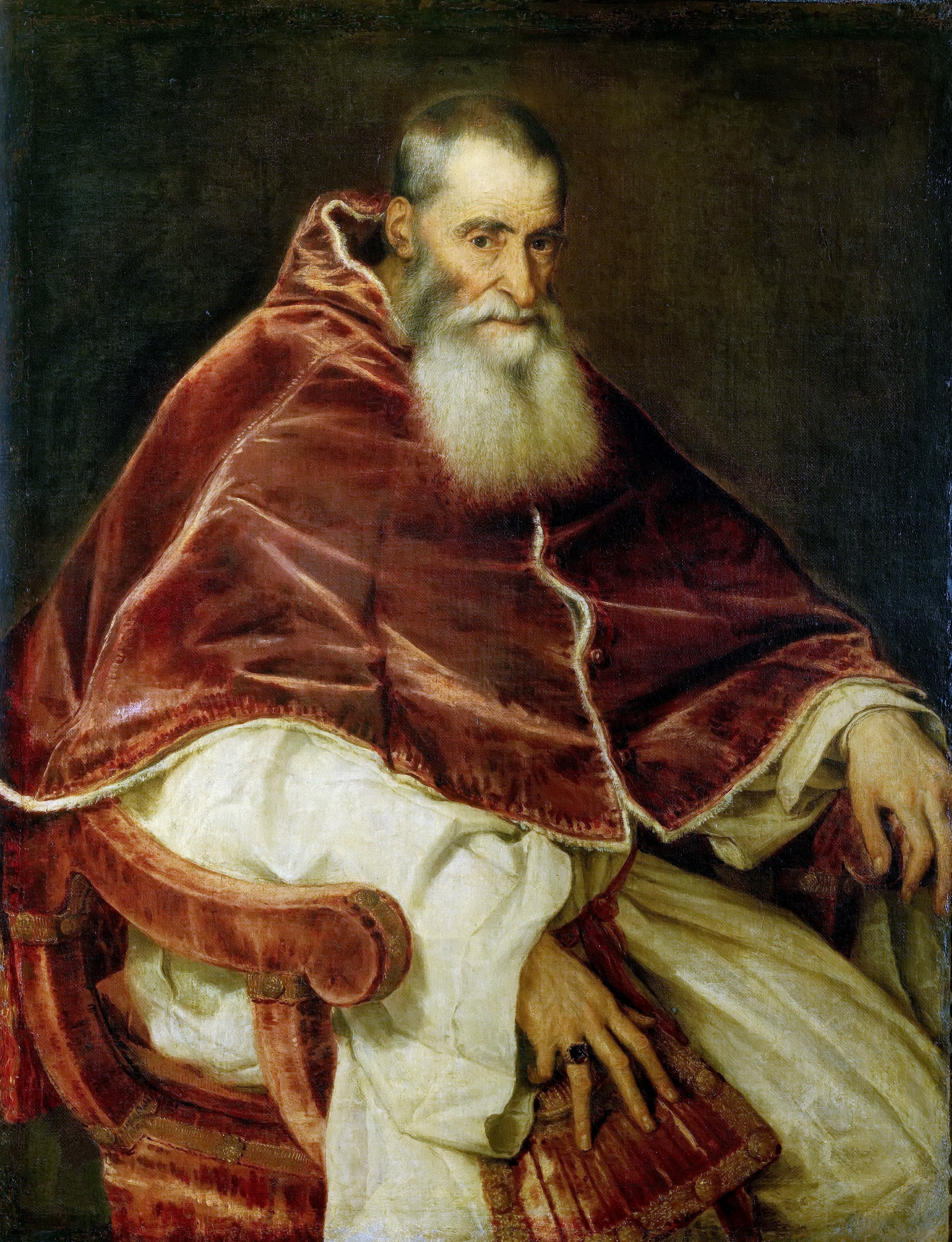
Pope Paul III Farnese had four illegitimate children and made his illegitimate son Pier Luigi Farnese the first duke of Parma.

This is a list of sexually active popes, Catholic priests who were not celibate before they became pope, and those who were legally married before becoming pope. Some candidates were allegedly sexually active before their election as pope, and others were thought to have been sexually active during their papacies. A number of them had children.

There are various classifications for those who were sexually active during their lives. Allegations of sexual activities are of varying levels of reliability, with contemporary political or religious opponents having made several. Some claims are generally accepted by modern historians, while other remain more contested.

== Background ==
For many years of the Church's history, celibacy was considered optional. Based on the customs of the times, it is assumed by many that most of the Twelve Apostles were married and had families. The New Testament (Mark 1:29–31; Matthew 8:14–15; Luke 4:38–39; 1 Timothy 3:2, 12; Titus 1:6) depicts at least Peter as being married, and bishops, priests and deacons of the Early Church were often married as well. In epigraphy, the testimony of the Church Fathers, synodal legislation, and papal decretals in the following centuries, a married clergy, in greater or lesser numbers, was a feature of the life of the Church. Celibacy was not required for those ordained and was accepted in the early Church, particularly by those in the monastic life.

Although various local Church councils had demanded celibacy of the clergy in a particular episcopal jurisdiction, it was not until the Second Lateran Council (1139) that officially made the promise to remain celibate a prerequisite to ordination within the Latin Church (and effectively ended any practice of a married priesthood). Subsequently, sexual relationships were generally undertaken outside the bonds of marriage, and each sexual act thus committed would have been considered a mortal sin — and is still considered as such by the church.

== Popes who were legally married ==
Name	Reign(s)	Relationship	Offspring	Notes
Saint Peter	30/33–64/68	Mother-in-law (Greek πενθερά, penthera) is mentioned in the Gospel verses Matthew 8:14–15, Luke 4:38, Mark 1:29–31, and who was healed by Jesus at her home in Capernaum. 1 Cor. 9:5 asks whether others have the right to be accompanied by Christian wives as does "Cephas" (Peter). Clement of Alexandria wrote: "When the blessed Peter saw his own wife led out to die, he rejoiced because of her summons and her return home, and called to her very encouragingly and comfortingly, addressing her by name, and saying, 'Remember the Lord.' Such was the marriage of the blessed, and their perfect disposition toward those dearest to them".	Yes	Later legends, dating from the 6th century onwards, suggested that Peter had a daughter – identified as Saint Petronilla. This connection is likely to be a result of the similarity of their names.
Felix III	483–492	Widowed before his election as pope	Yes	Himself the son of a priest, Felix fathered two children, one of whom was subsequently the mother of Pope Gregory I, making the latter his grandson.
Hormisdas	514–523	Widowed before he took holy orders	Yes	Father of Pope Silverius
Adrian II	867–872	Married to Stephania before he took holy orders, she was still living when he was elected pope and resided with him in the Lateran Palace.	Yes (a daughter)	His wife and daughter both resided with him until they were murdered by Eleutherius, brother of Anastasius Bibliothecarius, the Church's chief librarian.
John XVII	1003	Married before his election as pope	Yes (three sons)	All of his children became priests
Clement IV	1265–1268	Widowed before taking holy orders	Yes (two daughters)	Both children entered a convent
Honorius IV	1285–1287	Widowed before entering the clergy	Yes (at least two sons)	

== Fathered illegitimate children before holy orders ==
Name	Reign	Relationship	Offspring	Notes
Pius II	1458–1464	Not married	Yes (at least two)	Two children, both born before he formally entered the clergy. The first child, fathered while in Scotland, died in infancy. A second child fathered while in Strasbourg with a Breton woman named Elizabeth died 14 months later. He delayed becoming a cleric because of the requirement of chastity.
Innocent VIII	1484–1492	Not married	Yes (two)	Both born before he entered the clergy. Married elder son Franceschetto Cybo to the daughter of Lorenzo de' Medici, who in return obtained the cardinal's hat for his 13-year-old son Giovanni, who became Pope Leo X. His daughter Teodorina Cybo married Gerardo Usodimare.
Clement VII	1523–1534	Not married. Relationship with a servant or slave girl – possibly Simonetta da Collevecchio	Yes (one)	Identified as Alessandro de' Medici, Duke of Florence

== Known to or suspected of having fathered illegitimate children after receiving holy orders ==
Name	Reign	Relationship	Offspring	Notes
Julius II	1503–1513	Not married	Yes (three daughters)	Three illegitimate daughters, one of whom was Felice della Rovere (born in 1483, twenty years before his election as pope, and twelve years after his enthronement as bishop of Lausanne). The schismatic Conciliabulum of Pisa, which sought to depose him in 1511, also accused him of being a "sodomite".
Paul III	1534–1549	Not married. Silvia Ruffini as mistress	Yes (three sons and one daughter)	Held off ordination in order to continue his lifestyle, fathering four illegitimate children (three sons and one daughter) by Silvia Ruffini after his appointment as cardinal-deacon of Santi Cosimo and Damiano. He broke his relations with her ca. 1513. He made his illegitimate son Pier Luigi Farnese the first duke of Parma.
Pius IV	1559–1565	Not married	Allegedly three	One was a son born in 1541 or 1542. He also had two daughters.
Gregory XIII	1572–1585	Not married. Affair with Maddalena Fulchini	Yes	Received the ecclesiastical tonsure in Bologna in June 1539, and subsequently had an affair that resulted in the birth of Giacomo Boncompagni in 1548. Giacomo remained illegitimate, with Gregory later appointing him Gonfalonier of the Church, governor of the Castel Sant'Angelo and Fermo.
Leo XII	1823–1829	Not married	Allegedly three	As a young prelate, he came under suspicion of having a liaison with the wife of a Swiss Guard soldier and, as nuncio in Germany, allegedly fathered three illegitimate children.

== Popes alleged to be sexually active during pontificate ==
A majority of the allegations made in this section are disputed by modern historians.

=== Relationships with women ===
Name	Reign	Relationship	Offspring	Notes
Sergius III (Note: This allegation is disputed by some modern historians.)	904–911	Not married	Yes (at least one)	Accused of being the illegitimate father of Pope John XI by Marozia, the fifteen-year-old daughter of Theodora and Theophylact I, Count of Tusculum. Such accusations lay in Liutprand of Cremona's Antapodosis and the Liber Pontificalis. The accusations have discrepancies with another early source, the annalist Flodoard (c. 894–966): John XI was the brother of Alberic II, the latter being the offspring of Marozia and her husband Alberic I, so John too may have been the son of Marozia and Alberic I. Fauvarque emphasises that contemporary sources are dubious, Liutprand being "prone to exaggeration" while other mentions of this fatherhood appear in satires written by supporters of Pope Formosus.
John X	914–928	Not married. Affairs with Theodora and Marozia	No	Had romantic affairs with both Theodora and her daughter Marozia, according to Liutprand of Cremona in his Antapodosis. However, Monsignor Johann Peter Kirsch (ecclesiastical historian and Catholic priest) wrote, "This statement is, however, generally and rightly rejected as a calumny. Liutprand wrote his history some fifty years later, and constantly slandered the Romans, whom he hated."
John XII	955–964	Not married	No	Accused by adversaries of adultery and incest. Benedict of Soracte noted that he had "a collection of women". According to Liutprand of Cremona, "they testified about his adultery, which they did not see with their own eyes, but nonetheless knew with certainty: he had fornicated with the widow of Rainier, with Stephana his father's concubine, with the widow Anna, and with his own niece, and he made the sacred palace into a whorehouse". According to Chamberlin, John was "a Christian Caligula whose crimes were rendered particularly horrific by the office he held". Some sources report that he died eight days after being stricken by paralysis while in the act of adultery, others that he was killed by the jealous husband while in the act of committing adultery.
Alexander VI	1492–1503	Not married. Relationships with Vanozza dei Catanei and Giulia Farnese	Yes	Had a long affair with Vannozza dei Cattanei while still a priest, and before he became pope; and by her had his illegitimate children Cesare Borgia, Giovanni Borgia, Gioffre Borgia, and Lucrezia. A later mistress, Giulia Farnese, was the sister of Alessandro Farnese, giving birth to a daughter Laura while Alexander was in his 60s and reigning as pope.

=== Relationships with men ===
Name	Reign	Relationship	Notes
Paul II	1464–1471	Not married. Alleged affair with a page	Thought to have died of indigestion arising from eating melon, though his opponents alleged he died while being sodomized by a page.
Sixtus IV	1471–1484	Not married	According to Stefano Infessura, Sixtus was a "lover of boys and sodomites" – awarding benefices and bishoprics in return for sexual favours, and nominating a number of young men as cardinals, some of whom were celebrated for their good looks. Infessura had partisan allegiances to the Colonna family and so is not considered to be always reliable or impartial.
Leo X	1513–1521	Not married	Posthumously accused of homosexuality (by Francesco Guicciardini and Paolo Giovio). Falconi suggests he may have offered preferment to Marcantonio Flaminio because he was attracted to him. Historians have dealt with the issue of Leo's sexuality at least since the late 18th century, and few have given credence to the imputations made against him in his later years and decades following his death, or else have at least regarded them as unworthy of notice; without necessarily reaching conclusions on whether he was homosexual.
Julius III	1550–1555	Not married. Alleged affair with ennobled cardinal	Accusations of his homosexuality spread across Europe during his reign due to the favouritism shown to Innocenzo Ciocchi Del Monte, who rose from beggar to cardinal under Julius' patronage.
Paul VI	1963–1978	Not married. Alleged affair with Italian actor Paolo Carlini	In 1976, Paul VI became the first modern pope to publicly deny allegations of homosexuality, which had been raised by Roger Peyrefitte. The allegations have resurfaced periodically since and have been deemed credible by some sources.

=== Relationships with women and men ===
Name	Reign	Relationship	Offspring	Notes
Benedict IX	1032–1044, 1045, 1047–1048	Not married	No	Accused by Bishop Benno of Piacenza of "many vile adulteries". Pope Victor III referred in his third book of Dialogues to "his rapes... and other unspeakable acts". In May 1045, Benedict IX resigned his office to get married.

== See also ==
- Pope Joan
- Antipope John XXIII
- Antipope Felix V
- History of clerical celibacy in the Christian Church
