= Pope John XIX =

Head of the Catholic Church from 1024 to 1032

- Bishop of Rome
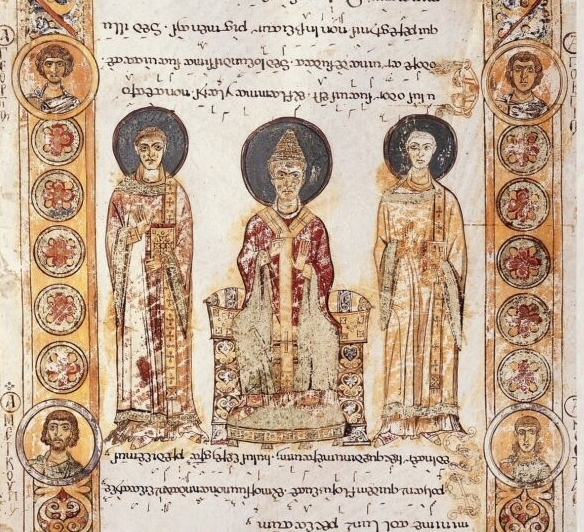
- Pope John XIX in a Bari Exultet roll, 1025
- Church: Catholic Church
- Papacy began: April 1024
- Papacy ended: October 1032
- Predecessor: Benedict VIII
- Successor: Benedict IX

Personal details
- Born: Roman of Tusculum (Italian: Romano di Toscolo) Rome, Papal States
- Died: October 1032 Rome, Papal States

Pope John XIX (Latin: Ioannes XIX; died October 1032), born Roman of Tusculum, was the Bishop of Rome and ruler of the Papal States from 1024 to his death. He belonged to the family of the powerful Counts of Tusculum, succeeding his brother, Benedict VIII. Papal relations with the Patriarchate of Constantinople soured during John XIX's pontificate. He was a supporter of Emperor Conrad II and patron of the musician Guido of Arezzo.

== Family ==
Romanus was born in Rome. He was the third son of Count Gregory I of Tusculum and his wife, Mary. During the pontificate of his brother, Benedict VIII, Romanus held temporal power in the city as consul and senator. Upon the death of Benedict, Romanus, a layman, was elected to succeed him. He was immediately ordained in all the orders in succession, and consecrated bishop in order to enable him to ascend the papal chair. He took the name of John.

== Papacy ==
John XIX played a role in the process leading to the Schism of 1054 by rejecting a proposal by Patriarch Eustathius of Constantinople to recognise that patriarchate's sphere of interest in the east. Against the grain of ecclesiastical history, John XIX agreed, upon being paid a large bribe, to recognize the patriarch of Constantinople's claim to the title of ecumenical bishop. However, this proposal excited general indignation throughout the Church, immediately compelling him to withdraw from the agreement.

John invited the celebrated musician, Guido of Arezzo, to visit Rome and explain the musical notation invented by him. He encouraged the Benedictine to instruct the Roman clergy in music.

On the death of the Emperor Henry II in 1024, John gave his support to Emperor Conrad II, who along with his wife, Gisela of Swabia, was crowned with great pomp at St. Peter's Basilica on Easter of 1027. Two kings, Rudolph III of Burgundy and Cnut the Great of Denmark and England, took part in this journey to Rome. Consistent with his role as a Christian king, Cnut went to Rome to repent for his sins, to pray for redemption and the security of his subjects, and to improve the conditions for pilgrims, as well as merchants, on the road to Rome. Rudolph had control of many of the toll gates. Negotiations being successful, the solemn word of the pope, Conrad and Rudolph was given with the witness of four archbishops, twenty bishops, and "innumerable multitudes of dukes and nobles", suggesting it was before the ceremonies were completed. In 1025 he sent the crown to Poland and blessed the coronation of the Polish king Bolesław I the Brave.

On 6 April 1027, John held a Lateran synod in which he declared for the patriarch of Aquileia against the patriarch of Grado, giving its bishop, Poppo of Aquileia, the patriarchal dignity and putting the bishop of Grado under his jurisdiction. In fact, the patriarch took precedence over all Italian bishops. In 1029, John revoked his decision and reaffirmed all the dignities of Grado. John also enacted a papal bull endowing Archbishop Byzantius of Bari with the right to consecrate his own twelve suffragans after the reattachment of the Bariot diocese to Rome in 1025. This was part of a conciliatory agreement with Eustathius, whereby the existence of the Byzantine Rite would be allowed in Italy in exchange for the establishment of churches celebrating the Latin liturgical rites in Constantinople.

Pope John XIX took the Cluny Abbey under his protection, and renewed its privileges in spite of the protests of Goslin, bishop of Macon. He offered Odilo of Cluny the archbishopric of Lyons, but Odilo refused and the pope then chided Odilo for disobedience. John XIX died shortly after. He was said to have been killed by a mob of angry peasants, but there is no direct evidence to support this. His nephew Benedict IX was selected to succeed him, although he was still young; according to some sources, he was only 12, but he was more likely to have been about 18 or 20.

== Family tree ==
John XIX was closely related to five other popes who reigned in the 10th and 11th centuries, as well as some of the most powerful rulers of Italy at the time.

Theophylact I, Count of Tusculum	Theodora
Hugh of Italy	Marozia
Alda of Vienne	Alberic II of Spoleto; 905–954	Pope John XI r. 931–935	David or Deodatus
Pope John XII r. 955–964	Gregory I, Count of Tusculum	Pope Benedict VII r. 974–983
Pope Benedict VIII r. 1012–1024	Alberic III, Count of Tusculum	Pope John XIX r. 1024–1032
Peter, Duke of the Romans	Pope Benedict IX r. 1032–1044, 1045, 1047–1048

== Sources ==
- Logan, F. Donald (2013). A History of the Church in the Middle Ages. Routledge. ISBN 9780415669948.
- Herbermann, Charles, ed. (1913). "Pope Benedict IX" . Catholic Encyclopedia. New York: Robert Appleton Company.
- Runciman, Steven. Byzantine Civilisation. London, University Paparback, 1961.

Catholic Church titles
Preceded by Benedict VIII	Pope; 1024–32	Succeeded by Benedict IX
