= Theophylact of Tusculum =

Theophylact of Tusculum may refer to:

- Theophylact I, Count of Tusculum
- Pope Benedict VIII
- Pope Benedict IX
