= Mincius =

Mincius may refer to:

- Mincius, the Latin name for the river Mincio
- Mincius, nickname for Antipope Benedict X (died 1073/1080), Antipope 1058–1059, called Mincius (thin) due to his ignorance
