= Raino of Tusculum =

12th-century Italian count

Raino, also Rayno, Ranulf, or Reginulf (died after 1179), was the last count of Tusculum from an unknown date when he was first associated with his elder brother, Jonathan, to his own death. His father, Ptolemy II, died in 1153. His mother was Bertha, illegitimate daughter of Henry V, Holy Roman Emperor.

He appears first in 1147, mortgaging Castrum Algidi to Pope Eugene III for 200 pounds.

Pope Adrian IV granted the fortress of Tusculum, which mortgage had bought from Oddo Frangipani, who in turn had purchased it from Oddo Colonna after Ptolemy was forced to mortgage it, to Jonathan in 1155. The Senate of Rome, however, refused to ratify the grant of the fortress to the count. In 1167, Raino appears for the first time as sole count. Pope Alexander III tried at that time to dissuade the citizens from attacking Tusculum, but to no avail. Raino called in the aid of Rainald of Dassel, the archchancellor of Italy and archbishop of Cologne. Raino and Rainald were besieged by the Romans in the old fortress of Tusculum. Help was requested from Christian, archbishop of Mainz, then in Ancona. With 1,300 Germans and Brabantines and the men of Robert II of Bassunvilla, Christian encamped beside Monte Porzio outside the city.

The Romans spurned all attempts at diplomatic resolution and marched an army of 40,000 on Tusculum. This was the largest army of Romans in many centuries to march into the field. The leader may have been Oddo Frangipani. The momentous Battle of Monte Porzio took place on May 29, 1167. The Romans were defeated and Tusculum preserved.

In 1169, Raino traded Tusculum to the Prefect John for Monte Fiascone and S. Flaviano. When John left the city, Raino tried to reenter, but was refused by the citizens, who gave the city to the pope on 8 August 1170. In 1171, Raino finally renounced the city to the papacy. The last count of Tusculum was thus removed from his office and even denied entry into his newly acquired towns. The fall of his house had been rapid and sharp.

After his Tusculuan reign, Raino continued to be active in territorial politics. He ceded Lariano to Pope Alexander III in exchange for Norma and Vicolo on 11 October 1179. By a treaty with Cencius and Oddone Frangipane, he obtained Terracina and Circegium in exchange for Tusculanum and Monte Cavo.

== Sources ==
- Gregorovius, Ferdinand. Rome in the Middle Ages Vol. IV Part 1. 1905.
