= Pope Stephen VII =

Head of the Catholic Church from 929 to 931

- Bishop of Rome
- Church: Catholic Church
- Papacy began: February 929
- Papacy ended: 15 March 931
- Predecessor: Leo VI
- Successor: John XI
- Previous post: Cardinal-Priest of Sant'Anastasia (928-929)

Orders
- Created cardinal: December 928 by Pope Leo VI

Personal details
- Born: Rome, Papal States
- Died: c. 15 March 931 Rome, Papal States

Pope Stephen VII (Latin: Stephanus VII; died 15 March 931) was the bishop of Rome and nominal ruler of the Papal States from February 929 to his death in 931. A candidate of the infamous Marozia, his pontificate occurred during the period known as the Saeculum obscurum.

== Election ==
Stephen was a Roman by birth, the son of Germanic (Goth) Theodemundus/Theudemund. He was the cardinal-priest of St Anastasia in Rome. He was probably handpicked by Marozia, the true ruler of Rome during the Saeculum obscurum, to become pope as a stop-gap measure until her own son John was ready to assume the role.

== Pontificate ==
Very little is known about Stephen's pontificate. During his two years as pope, Stephen confirmed the privileges of a few religious houses in France and Italy. As a reward for helping free Stephen from the oppression of Hugh of Arles, Stephen granted Cante di Gabrielli the position of papal governor of Gubbio, and control over a number of key fortresses. Stephen was also noted for the severity with which he treated clergy who strayed in their morals. He was also, apparently, according to a hostile Greek source from the twelfth century, the first pope who went around clean shaved whilst pope.

Stephen died around 15 March 931, and was succeeded by Marozia's son John XI.

Catholic Church titles
| Preceded by Leo VI | Pope; 929–931 | Succeeded by John XI |
