= Gregory I of Tusculum =

Count of Tusculum

Gregory I
- Praefectus navalis
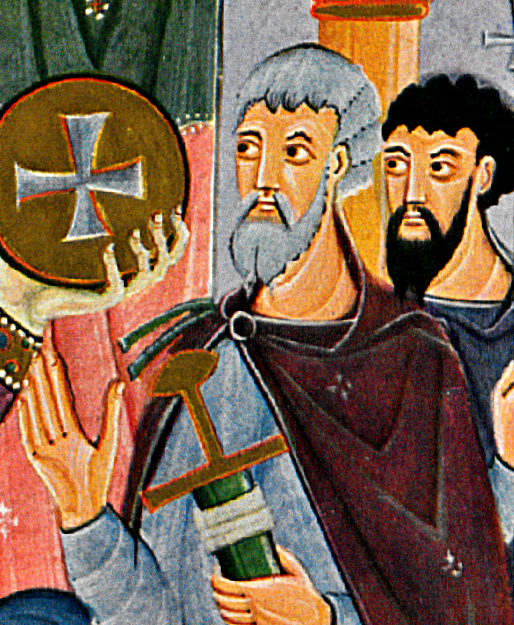
- Depiction of nobleman, possibly Gregory I, in the Gospels of Otto III, c. 1000

Ruler of Rome
- Reign: 1001 – 1002
- Predecessor: None; Imperial rule (Crescentius II the Younger in 998)
- Successor: John II Crescentius

Lord of Tusculum
- Reign: Before 18 May 1012
- Successor: Alberic III
- Born: c. 950; Papal States
- Died: Before 18 May 1012 (aged c. 62); Papal States
- Spouse: Maria
- Issue more...: Alberic III; Theophylact II (Pope Benedict VIII); Romanus (Pope John XIX)
- House: Counts of Tusculum (Founder)
- Father: Theophylact (II)
- Mother: Marozia II

Gregory I of Tusculum (Italian: Gregorio I de' Conti di Tuscolo, c. 950 – Before 18 May 1012) was a Roman aristocrat and one of the most prominent figures in the political life of Rome during the late 10th and early 11th centuries. He was the founder of the House of Tusculum, which became one of the most powerful aristocratic dynasties in Rome and produced three popes during the first half of the 11th century, two of whom were Gregory's sons: Theophylact II, who became Pope Benedict VIII (r. 1012–1024), and Romanus, who became Pope John XIX (r. 1024–1032).

A relative of Alberic II and Crescentius I the Elder, Gregory initially maintained close relations with Holy Roman Emperor Otto III (r. 996–1002) and Pope Sylvester II (r. 999–1003). He held the title of naval prefect under the Emperor, which is attested in a document of 999. In 1001, however, he joined the Roman revolt against Otto III, which forced the emperor to flee the city. Following Otto's departure, Gregory briefly emerged as the dominant political figure in Rome, before power was restored to the rival Crescentii family under John II Crescentius.

== Biography ==
=== Early life and family ===
Gregory I was presumably born in Latium around 950. His activities are difficult to reconstruct because of the scarcity of sources for the period in which he was active, which extended from the second half of the 10th century into the early 11th century. He married a woman named Maria and is mentioned in several documents dating from the pontificate of Pope Benedict VII (r. 974–983). In a document of 980, he is recorded as rector of the monastery of St Andrew the Apostle and St Lucy in Rome.

Italian postcard depicting Gregory I and the founding of the Abbey of Grottaferrata, 1904

The same document identifies him as the son of the senatrix Marozia II, related to the Crescentii family (Note: She was the sister of Crescentius I the Elder.), describing him as “filius Maroze senatrix”. This contemporary evidence contradicts the later genealogical tradition that identifies Gregory as a son of Alberic II of Spoleto and his wife Alda. Recent historiography generally identifies him instead as the son of Theophylact (II), vestararius (Note: An official responsible for the papal wardrobe and ceremonial garments.), and Marozia II. Theophylact was likely not a descendant of Alberic II, although some have considered him a possible son of Alberic II. Marozia II was the daughter of Theodora II, herself the daughter of Theophylact I and sister of Marozia I, making her a first cousin of Alberic II. Through his mother, Gregory was therefore certainly a member of, or closely connected to, the Theophylacti family, regardless of the uncertain identity of his father.

=== Rise under Otto III ===
By the late 10th century, Gregory had emerged as one of the most prominent members of the Roman aristocracy. Under the reign of Holy Roman Emperor Otto III (r. 996–1002), he occupied an important position in the political life of Rome and maintained close relations with the imperial court. In a document of 999 concerning a dispute between the Abbey of Farfa and the Monastery of Saints Cosmas and Damian, Gregory is listed among the leading figures present before the emperor. He is described as an “excellentissimus vir qui vocatur de Tusculana” (The most excellent man who is called "of Tusculum") and is given the title of praefectus navalis (Naval prefect). The document suggests that Gregory enjoyed considerable prestige among the Roman aristocracy and was regarded with particular favour by Otto III.

At the time, Rome was dominated by the rivalry between the leading aristocratic families of the city, particularly the Theophylacti and the Crescentii. The latter had become one of the principal political forces in Rome following the death of Pope John XII (r. 955–964), son of Alberic II. Crescentius I the Elder, who had previously opposed Pope Benedict VI (r. 973–974), was succeeded in political influence by his sons, John I Crescentius, who became patricius, and Crescentius II the Younger, who held the title of senator and was granted the county of Terracina. Following the death of John I around 991, Crescentius II became the dominant ruler of Rome. His power was challenged by Emperor Otto III after the accession of Pope Gregory V (r. 996–999), the Emperor's cousin, and Crescentius II was defeated and executed by imperial forces at Castel Sant'Angelo on 29 April 998. The destruction of his regime temporarily weakened the Crescentii and allowed a new political balance to emerge in Rome, in which Gregory I became increasingly prominent.

His position of trust is further illustrated by a document from 1000, when Pope Sylvester II (r. 999–1003) entrusted Gregory with an embassy to Otto III concerning the growing hostility of the Roman population towards the emperor. Gregory's involvement in the mission indicates that, at this stage, he remained an important intermediary between the Roman aristocracy, the papacy and the imperial court.

=== Revolt of 1001 ===
Gregory's close relationship with Otto III did not last. In 1001, he joined the Roman revolt against the emperor and became one of its leading figures. The uprising forced Otto III and Pope Sylvester II to flee Rome. The German chronicler Thietmar of Merseburg, who had previously described Gregory as being highly favoured by the emperor, emphasized his apparent betrayal, writing that Gregory, who had been greatly loved by the emperor, secretly plotted against him.

Gregory's role in the revolt should not necessarily be understood as a simple shift from a pro-imperial to an anti-imperial faction. Political groupings in Rome at the time were fluid, and the conflict was influenced by the presence of the emperor and his troops, as well as by wider Roman hostility towards foreign intervention. Following Otto's departure, Gregory briefly emerged as one of the dominant political figures in the city. Otto III, however, did not abandon his claim to Rome. After leaving the city, he travelled to Ravenna with Sylvester II, where he prepared to return with a larger force. Gregory's position therefore remained uncertain, as the emperor was already planning to recover Rome by force.

Otto, however, died unexpectedly in 1002 while preparing for his return, preventing him from carrying out this plan. Otto's death created a new political situation in Rome. With the immediate imperial threat removed, the rival Crescentii family, led by John II Crescentius, was able to reassert its dominance over the city.

=== Later life ===
Little is known about Gregory's activities during the decade after the return of the Crescentii. During this period Gregory appears to have maintained his position among the Roman aristocracy. His later career is particularly difficult to reconstruct because of the scarcity of surviving sources. Gregory is nevertheless remembered for his patronage of the monk Nilus the Younger. He allowed Nilus and his monks to settle on his estates in 1004, where they established the monastic community that later developed into the Abbey of Saint Mary of Grottaferrata. The Vita Sancti Nili describes Gregory as a shrewd and pragmatic man, praising his intelligence and prudence while also portraying him as ambitious and politically ruthless.

Gregory probably died sometime before 18 May 1012, when his son Theophylact II became Pope. His death is also recorded indirectly in a document dated to 1013 from the Abbey of Farfa, in which Theophylact made a donation to the monastery pro remedio animae of his parents, Gregory and Maria.

== Marriage and children ==
Gregory married a woman named Maria, with whom he had several children. His descendants became one of the most powerful aristocratic families in Rome and established the political dynasty traditionally known as the Counts of Tusculum. His known children were:

- Alberic III (c. 975 – After 1033), Count of Tusculum, who continued the family's political influence in Rome. His son Theophylact III later became Pope Benedict IX (r. 1032–1048).
- Theophylact II (c. 980 – 9 April 1024), who became Pope Benedict VIII (r. 1012–1024).
- Romanus (c. 985 – October 1032), who became Pope John XIX (r. 1024–1032).
- Marozia III (c. 980 – After 1028), who married Transamund II, Count of Chieti; son of Transamund III, Duke of Spoleto (r. 982–989).

== Sources ==
- Longo, Umberto (2002). "Dizionario Biografico degli Italiani - Volume 59 - Gregorio di Tuscolo". Treccani.
- Romeo #1, Carlo (1984). "Dizionario Biografico degli Italiani - Volume 30 - Crescenzio Nomentano". Treccani.
- Pauler, Roland (2001). "Dizionario Biografico degli Italiani - Volume 55 - GIOVANNI XIII, papa". Treccani.
- Romeo #2, Carlo (1984). "Dizionario Biografico degli Italiani - Volume 30 - CRESCENZIO de Caballo Marmoreo". Treccani.
- Lupis, Marco (2005). "Origine della dinastia Colonna: i Tuscolani". Enciclopedia genealogica del Mediterraneo.
- Arnaldi, Girolamo (1960). "Dizionario Biografico degli Italiani - Volume 1 - ALBERICO di Roma". Treccani.
- Carpegna Falconieri, Tommaso (2008). "Dizionario Biografico degli Italiani - Volume 70 - Marozia". Treccani.
- Comyn, Robert (1851). The History of the Western Empire: From its Restoration by Charlemagne to the Accession of Charles V. London: William H. Allen & Co – via Internet Archive.
- Romeo #3, Carlo (1984). "Dizionario Biografico degli Italiani - Volume 30 - CRESCENZIO de Theodora". Treccani.
- West-Harling, Veronica (2025). "The visibility of women in tenth-century Rome". Wiley Online Library.
- Romeo #4, Carlo (1984). "Dizionario Biografico degli Italiani - Volume 30 - CRESCENZIO". Treccani.
