= Pope Anastasius III =

Head of the Catholic Church from 911 to 913

- Bishop of Rome
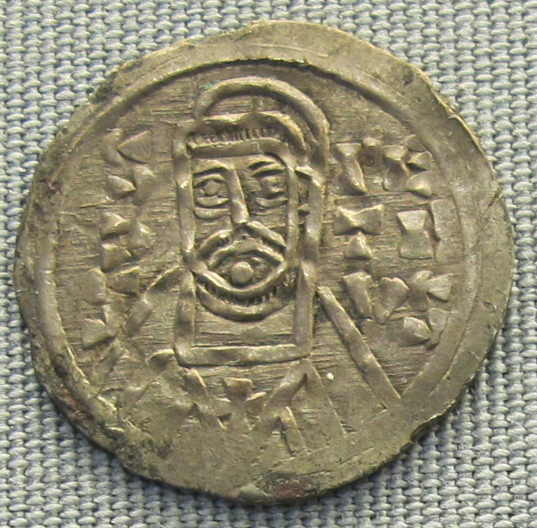
- Denarius of Anastasius III
- Church: Catholic Church
- Papacy began: April 911
- Papacy ended: June 913
- Predecessor: Sergius III
- Successor: Lando

Personal details
- Born: c. 865 Rome, Papal States
- Died: June 913 Rome, Papal States

Pope Anastasius III (c. 865 — June 913) was the bishop of Rome and ruler of the Papal States from April 911 to his death.

Anastasius was a Roman by birth. A Roman nobleman, Lucian, is sometimes recognized as his father, although other sources assert that he was the illegitimate son of his predecessor, Pope Sergius III.

Almost nothing is recorded of Pope Anastasius III, his pontificate falling in the period when Rome and the papacy were in the power of Theophylact I of Tusculum and Theodora, who approved Anastasius III's candidacy. Under his reign, the Normans of Rollo were evangelized. Anastasius III's papacy faced renewed threats from the Saracens, after they established themselves on the Garigliano river. He was buried in St. Peter's Basilica.

Catholic Church titles
Preceded by Sergius III	Pope; 911–913	Succeeded by Lando
