= Battle of Monte Porzio =

1167 battle between the Holy Roman Empire and the Commune of Rome

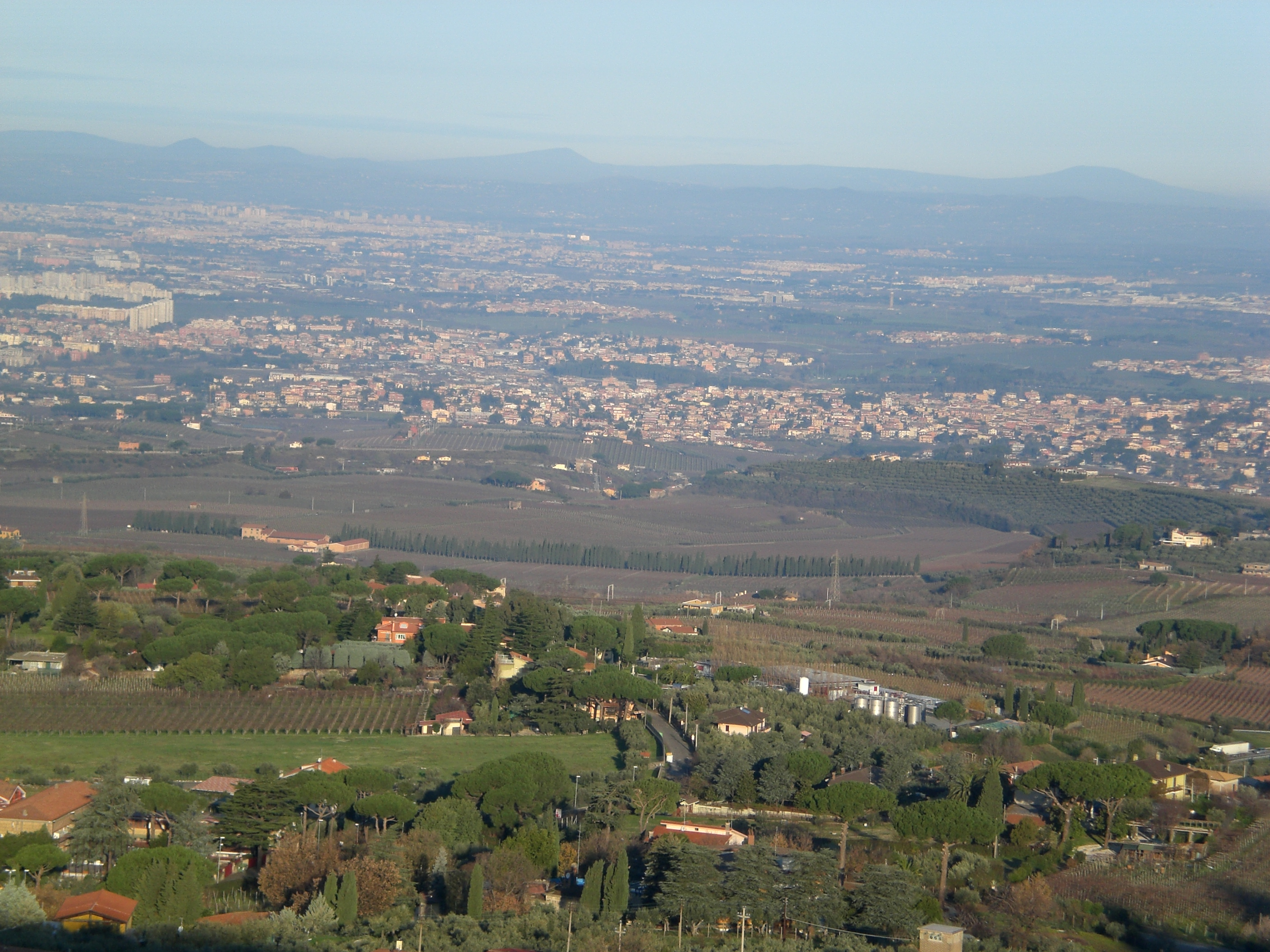
- Prataporci site, where the battle took place, view from Monte Porzio Catone
Date	29 May 1167
Location	Between the hill of Monte Porzio Catone and the walls of the city of Tusculum, the field of "Prataporci", modern Lazio 41°49′05″N 12°42′59″E
Result	Imperial victory

Belligerents
Holy Roman Empire	Roman city-state (Commune of Rome) army

Commanders and leaders
Christian of Mainz; Rainald of Dassel	Oddo Frangipani

Strength
1,600 men	10,000 men

Casualties and losses
Unknown	Unknown

The Battle of Monte Porzio (also called the Battle of Tusculum) was fought on 29 May 1167 between the Holy Roman Empire and the Commune of Rome. The communal Roman army, which one historian has called the "greatest army which Rome had sent into the field in centuries", was defeated by the forces of the Emperor Frederick Barbarossa and his local allies, the Counts of Tusculum and the ruler of Albano. Comparing its effect on the city of Rome, one historian has called Monte Porzio the "Cannae of the Middle Ages".

The site of the battle was the field between a small hill and the walls of the city of Tusculum, at a place called "Prataporci", about 25 km southeast of Rome. In his universal chronicle, the Chronica Universalis, the contemporary writer Sicard of Cremona describes the site of battle as "near Monte Porzio" (apud Montem Portium).

The Battle of Monte Porzio is part of the long struggle between the Italian city-states and the Holy Roman Empire. In 1166, Barbarossa set out on an expedition to Italy with the intent of deposing the anti-imperialist Pope Alexander III and setting up his own antipope, Paschal III. He also sent two eminent prelates of the Empire, Archbishop Rainald of Cologne and Archbishop Christian of Mainz, commanding armies into Latium (the region around Rome) to subdue those city-states still opposing the power of the emperor. On 18 May, Rainald took Civitavecchia and then moved into the friendly city of Tusculum, possibly at the suggestion of Count Raino, an imperialist. The communal Roman army had been harassing Tusculum, a longtime rival. Pope Alexander, knowing that Barbarossa was likely to come to Raino's assistance, urged the Romans to abstain from attacking his city. It did not work: when the consul (leader) of the Roman commune learned of the arrival of Rainald at Tusculum, he sent an army to besiege the archbishop in the city.

With the Roman army approaching, Count Raino and Archbishop Rainald sent word to Christian, who was away besieging Ancona on the coast, to come to their relief. Within Christian's army were the forces commanded by Bishop Alexander II of Liège, and Count Robert III of Loritello. The total number of troops Christian was leading was about 1,300, which, according to Otto of Sankt Blasien, was a combination of 500 knights (milites in contemporary Latin) and 800 caesarianos (imperial troops). Otto places 300 men inside Tusculum. Other chroniclers claimed Christian had with him 1,000 cavalry and some Brabantine mercenaries. The lowest estimate of Christian's forces put it at 500 men.

Christian encamped his army beside the hill and rested for a day while trying to negotiate a resolution. The communal Roman army refused Christian's diplomatic overtures and instead attacked with their whole force, numbering 10,000 poorly armed men, on Whitsunday. The name of the leader of the Roman force has not been preserved, but it may have been Oddo Frangipani. The Imperial forces were gravely outnumbered, but they were more disciplined and better armed. The Brabantines together with the cavalry from Rainald's city, Cologne, withstood the charge of the Roman infantry. Two sallies from Tusculum divided the Romans: one hitting their flank and one running through the centre. As the Roman cavalry fled the field, the Brabantines descended on the Roman camp. Only a third of the Roman army had made it inside Rome's walls before nightfall. Thousands were eventually taken prisoner and sent to Viterbo (including a son of Oddo Frangipani), and more were left dead on the field and the road.

The pope and Oddo took refuge in the Colosseum (which at the time was fortified like a castle) and called in reinforcements. The city prepared for a siege. Later the pope fled to the city of Benevento and the Emperor entered Rome. The Imperial army, however, was hard hit by a wave of either malaria or plague, and Barbarossa withdrew his forces to Germany.

== Contemporary accounts ==
A number of contemporary accounts of the battle exist, including a letter by Archbishop Rainald. This account of the battle by Otto of Saint Blasien is taken from the Monumenta Germanica Historica Scriptores SS., 20.

In the year 1166 since the birth of Christ, Emperor Frederick, after settling the conflict between the princes, as we have mentioned, and restoring good order to the situation in Germany, assembled an army from all parts of the empire and led it into Italy, crossing the Alps for the fourth time. Then he crossed the Apennines, and, leading his army through Tuscany, he turned to the March of Ancona, and surrounded the rebellious city of Ancona with a siege. In the meantime, Reinald, the archbishop of Cologne, who had previously separated himself from the emperor on imperial business, turned against the castle of Tusculanum near Rome, as he was returning with his corps to rejoin the emperor, in order to take care of the situation there. When this was reported in Rome by messengers, the Romans, whose strength was estimated as 30,000 armed men, moved out from the entire city and suddenly besieged the archbishop in the castle, to the dishonor of the emperor. As soon as this was reported to the emperor at Ancona, he assembled the princes and asked them whether or not he should give up the siege of Ancona and go to the aid of the archbishop. A few of the princes, most of them of the laity, who feared the spread of unfavorable rumors that would result from a lifting of the siege, advised against it. Angered by this agreement of the princes, because the lay princes had such small regard for him and his colleagues or abandoned them in danger, the stately archbishop of Mainz, Christian, called together his men and others whose aid he could enlist by pleas and rewards. He assembled 500 knights and 800 mercenaries, appropriately equipped for war, and moved out toward Tusculanum against the Romans, in order to relieve the archbishop. When he arrived there and had pitched his camp opposite the Romans, he sent emissaries to them to request peace for that day only to allow his army to rest, recalling the virtue of the noble attitude that was characteristic of the ancient Romans. In this way, he hoped to win his demands from them. But the Romans themselves, completely unlike the ancients in this and all other respects, answered that they would not grant his request but arrogantly threatened that on this day they would give him and his entire army to the birds of heaven and the wild animals of the earth to eat. Giving up the siege, they formed 30,000 warriors in line of battle against 500 German knights. But the archbishop, completely unshaken by the answer he had received from them – for he was not inexperienced in the troubles of war – with great energy encouraged his men for battle by promises and threats. Even though their number was very small in comparison with their opponents, he knew they were battle-hardened fighters. He warned them in noble words that they could not place their hope in flight, since they were too distant from their fatherland and the emperor's army to be able to flee, but, mindful of their inherent courage and of the cowardice that was natural to their enemies, they should fight for their lives with all their strength. But when he saw that the knights were filled with German fury ("animositate Teutonica") – for his exhortation had injected a certain invincible courage in their hearts – he formed his lines and specified precisely which ones were to fight at first, which were to break into the fighting enemy forces from the flank, which ones were to bring help to those in trouble in the fight, while he himself took position where he could bring help with the most highly selected men. And now he moved into the fight against the Romans with raised banners and widely deployed cohorts, placing his hope in God. The archbishop of Cologne, however, armed himself and the garrison of the castle and all his men, a number estimated as 300 well-armed knights, in order to be able to give help under any circumstances, and he remained calmly in the castle until the start of the battle. After the battle had begun and the lances were broken at the first clash of the armies, the fight was carried on with swords, while the archers on both sides obscured the light of day with their arrows as if they were snow flakes. And behold, the archbishop of Cologne, breaking out of the castle with his eager knights, attacked the Romans from the rear and pushed against them courageously, so that they were surrounded on all sides, attacked from front and rear. While the Romans therefore were fighting only with the weight of their mass, Bishop Christian with his men penetrated their battle line from the flank, tore the middle of their formation apart, and covered with blows the enemy that was thus skillfully separated into three groups. After many had been killed and a number taken prisoner, the defeated Romans took to flight and, pursued by their conquerors up to the city, they were cut down in the bloodiest slaughter. After they had called back their knights from this butchery, the bishops returned to the battlefield and spent that night celebrating with the greatest joy.

== Sources ==
- Gregorovius, Ferdinand. Rome in the Middle Ages Vol. IV Part 1. trans. Annie Hamilton. 1905.
- Ottonis de Sancto Blasio Chronica. trans. G. A. Loud.
- The Battle of Tusculum, 1167.
