= Oddone Frangipane =

Roman lord and military leader

Oddone Frangipane (also Oddo or Otto, Latin: Odo Frajapanis) was a Roman lord and military leader in the service of the Papacy in the 12th century.

He was the son of Leo and grandson of Cencio II of the Frangipani family. Oddone had another brother named Cencio. During the middle of the twelfth century, he was the most influential aristocrat in Rome. His career began sometime around 1130. He supported the legitimate popes and opposed the Ghibellines and their Senate.

His family acquired the fortress of Tusculum from Ptolemy II somehow before December 1152, when he sold his rights over Tusculum to Pope Eugene III. In 1155, he acted on behalf of Adrian IV in negotiations with Frederick Barbarossa. In 1156, he was at Benevento to accept the submission of William I of Sicily to the pope. This submission resulted in the confirmation of the Treaty of Benevento. After the papal election of 7 September 1159, Oddone wrote to Louis VII of France exhorting him to support Alexander III. When Alexander was arrested by supporters of the imperialist Antipope Victor IV, it was Oddone who freed him and sent to safety in Campania.

Oddone took over the military leadership of the city of Rome during the absence of Alexander and even afterwards. His son Leo was captured in battle with the emperor's troops in 1167 and he himself led the largest army of Roman citizens since the days of the Roman Empire into battle at Monte Porzio, where he was defeated by Christian I, Archbishop of Mainz.

In the spring of 1170, Oddone remarried to a woman named Eudoxia, a Byzantine princess. He had a son by her named Emanuele. He died some time not long after.

== Sources ==
- Caravale, Mario (ed). Dizionario Biografico degli Italiani: L Francesco I Sforza – Gabbi. Rome, 1998.
- Gregorovius, Ferdinand. Rome in the Middle Ages Vol. II. trans. Annie Hamilton. 1905.
