= Alberic II of Spoleto =

Ruler of Rome from 932 to 954 (died 954)

Princeps of Rome
- Reign: 932–954
- Born: Rome, Papal States
- Died: 954; Rome, Papal States
- Spouses: Alda
- Issue: Pope John XII
- Dynasty: Theophylact
- Father: Alberic I of Spoleto
- Mother: Marozia

Alberic II (died 954) was princeps of Rome from 932 to 954. He controlled the papacy during his reign and the five popes after Pope John XI were appointed by him. A member of the House of Theophylact, Alberic was the father of Pope John XII and multiple other popes were descended from Alberic.

Born to Marozia and Alberic I of Spoleto, Alberic was held in a lower regard by his mother when compared to his brother Pope John XI. Alberic gained power in Rome after deposing his mother and his stepfather Hugh of Italy in 932. Alberic's title of princeps was recognised by Emperor Constantine VII of the Byzantine Empire.

Rome was peaceful during Alberic's reign and he was noted for his reconstruction of monasteries. His control over the papacy was so strong that Pope Marinus II would not act without Alberic's command and Pope Stephen VIII was imprisoned and tortured by Alberic. Alberic secured the appointment of his son as pope before dying in 954.

== Early life ==
Alberic II of Spoleto was born on the Aventine Hill to Marozia and Alberic I of Spoleto. He was a member of the House of Theophylact, which ruled over Rome for four generations. Marozia was the daughter of Theophylact I, Count of Tusculum and Alberic I was an ally of Theophylact. Alberic I died in the 920s and Marozia married Guy, Margrave of Tuscany. She assumed control of Rome after a power struggle with Pope John X and his brother Peter; Peter was murdered by Marozia. Marozia favoured Alberic's brother Pope John XI more than him.

Guy died in 929, and Marozia married Hugh of Italy in 932. Alberic, now a teenager, opposed this marriage. Liutprand of Cremona claims that Hugh and Alberic had a falling out due to a perceived insult because during a wedding banquet's ritual of pouring water on Hugh's hands, Alberic split some of the water and that led to Hugh slapping Alberic in public. However, Benedict of Soracte claimed that Alberic discovered a plot by Hugh to have him blinded. Alberic raised a mob and was able to drive Hugh out of Rome. Moreover, he imprisoned Marozia, who died some time before 945.

== Reign ==
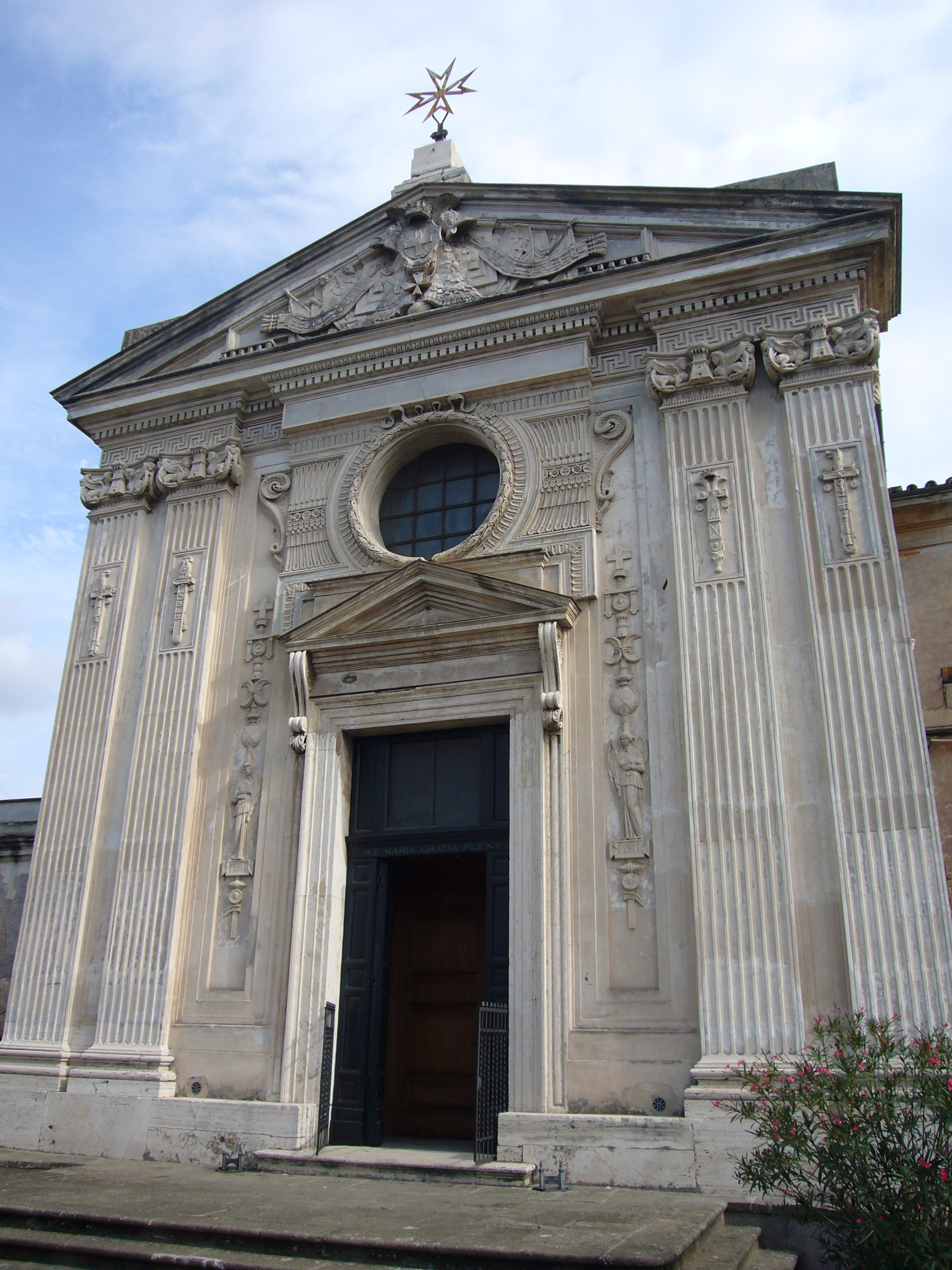
Santa Maria del Priorato is the only surviving church that was endowed or founded by Alberic.

From 932 to 954, Alberic II ruled over Rome and his residence was in the Via del Corso. His reign was a period of relative peace for Rome and Benedict of Soracte wrote that he defended the city from the Lombards. Liutprand of Cremona described Alberic as an usurper and tyrant that treated the popes like servants.

Early during Alberic's rule he used the titles vestararius, first senator, and duke of the Romans. He later started using the titles senator omnium Romanorum (senator of all the Romans) and princeps, which was included on his coinage. The title princeps was used by Augustus, founder of the Roman Empire. Emperor Constantine VII acknowledged Alberic's usage of the title prince on two occasions.

The five popes after Pope John XI were all appointed by Alberic. Prior popes minted coins in their own names, but Alberic's name appeared alongside the popes. Benedict of Soracte wrote that Pope Marinus II would take no action unless at Alberic's command. Pope Stephen VIII fell out of favour with Alberic and participated in a plot to overthrow him; Stephen VIII was imprisoned and tortured before dying from his wounds. Otto the Great was denied a coronation as Holy Roman Emperor by Alberic in 951.

Monasteries which had been abandoned due to Muslim attacks in the prior decades were restored by Alberic. Benedict of Soracte referred to Alberic as gloriosus princeps Albericus and cultor monasteriorum (cultivator of monasteries). Santa Maria del Priorato Church is the only surviving church that was endowed or founded by Alberic; It was constructed on the house he was born in. Odo of Cluny was made archimandrite for all of the monasteries in Rome by Alberic.

Hugh unsuccessfully tried to retake Rome in 933 and 936. Odo of Cluny served as an emissary between Alberic and Hugh between 936 and 942. An agreement was reached in which Alberic married Hugh's daughter Alda. This union produced a son named Octavian, the birth name of Augustus. Some time before his marriage to Alda, Alberic sent Benedict Campaninus to obtain a dynastic marriage for him from the Byzantine Empire, but he was unsuccessful.

== Death and legacy ==
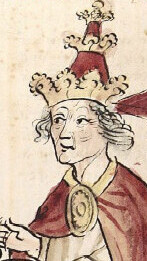
Alberic's son Octavian was appointed pope in 955 and took the pontifical name of Pope John XII.

Alberic died in Rome in 954, with a death date of 31 August 954 being listed for Albericus consul Romanorum at one of his family's monastic foundations. Before his death, Alberic had the aristocracy of Rome promise to appoint his son as the next pope. Pope Agapetus II died in 955 and was succeeded by Octavian, who took the pontifical name of Pope John XII. This agreement was in violation of a decree by Pope Symmachus from 499 prohibiting agreements about a pope's successor while the current pope was still alive. Otto the Great, who was denied a coronation in 951, was crowned as Holy Roman Emperor by John XII in 962; this line of emperors continued until the dissolution of the Holy Roman Empire in 1806. John XII died in 964.

Popes Benedict VII, Benedict VIII, John XIX, Benedict IX, and antipopes Benedict X and Victor IV were descended from or related to Alberic and Alda. Alberic was either the father or grandfather of Gregory I, Count of Tusculum. Alberic's title senator omnium Romanorum was later used by Crescentius the Younger in 988.

== Works cited ==
=== Books ===
- Allen, Bruce (2018). Tiber: Eternal River of Rome. University Press of New England. ISBN 9781512603347.
- Chamberlin, E. (1986). The Bad Popes. Dorset Press. ISBN 0880291168.
- Cushing, Kathleen (2005). Reform and the papacy in the eleventh century: Spirituality and social change. Vol. 36. Manchester University Press. ISBN 9780719058349. JSTOR j.ctv2gmhhsj.
- Duffy, Eamon (2014). Saints and Sinners: A History of the Popes (4 ed.). Yale University Press. ISBN 9780300115970.
- Grierson, Philip; Blackburn, Mark (1986). Medieval European Coinage: The Early Middle Ages (5th-10th Centuries). Vol. 1. Cambridge University Press. ISBN 9780521031776.
- Kelly, John (1988). The Oxford Dictionary of Popes. Oxford University Press. ISBN 0192820850.
- Levillain, Philippe (2002). The Papacy: An Encyclopedia. Vol. 2. Routledge. ISBN 0415922305.
- Maskarinec, Maya (2025). Domesticating Saints in Medieval and Early Modern Rome. University of Pennsylvania Press. ISBN 9781512827026.
- Osborne, John (2025). Rome in the Tenth Century: A History in Art. Cambridge University Press. ISBN 9781009639705.
- Vauchez, André (2000). Encyclopedia of the Middle Ages: A-J. Vol. 1. Fitzroy Dearborn Publishers. ISBN 1579582826.
- West-Harling, Veronica (2020). Rome, Ravenna, and Venice, 750-1000: Byzantine Heritage, Imperial Present, and the Construction of City Identity. Oxford University Press. ISBN 9780191815942.
- Williams, George (1998). Papal Genealogy: The Families and Descendants of the Popes. McFarland & Company. ISBN 9780786420711.

=== Journals ===
- Coates-Stephens, Robert (1997). "Dark Age Architecture in Rome". Papers of the British School at Rome. 65. British School at Rome: 177–232. doi:10.1017/S0068246200010631. JSTOR 40310950.

=== Web ===
- "Alberico di Roma". Treccani. Archived from the original on 18 July 2025.
