= Jonathan of Tusculum =

Jonathan (died before 1167) was the count of Tusculum from the death of his father, Ptolemy II, in 1153 to his own death. His mother was Bertha, illegitimate daughter of Henry V, Holy Roman Emperor.

He was, by inheritance, an imperial vassal, but Pope Adrian IV granted him the papal property (the great fortress) in Tusculum and invested him as a papal vassal as well. He swore homage on 9 July 1155 to the pope excepto contra Imperatorem—"except against the emperor." In turn, he surrendered Montisfortini and Faiola to the papacy. The Senate of Rome, however, refused to ratify the grant of the fortress to the count.

In 1163, he was invested with the port of Astura, which his father had illegally held from the church, by the abbot of S. Alessio. At some point during his countship, he must have associated his younger brother Raino with him, for Raino appears as sole count in 1167.

== Sources ==
- Gregorovius, Ferdinand. Rome in the Middle Ages Vol. IV Part 1. 1905.
- Lexikon des Mittelalters: Gionata Graf von Tusculum.
