= Antipope Gregory VI =

Antipope in 1012

- Papacy began: May 1012
- Papacy ended: c. 25 December 1012
- Predecessor: Roman claimant: Sergius IV; Benedict VIII; Antipapal claimant: John XVI
- Successor: Roman claimant: Benedict VIII; Antipapal claimant: Benedict X
- Opposed to: Pope Benedict VIII

On the death of Pope Sergius IV on 12 May 1012, a "certain Gregory" opposed the party of the Theophylae (which elected Pope Benedict VIII against him), and had himself made pope, seemingly by a small faction. Gregory VI was the first to claim to be pope as successor to Sergius IV, and Benedict VIII's claim was subsequent.

Promptly expelled from Rome, Gregory made his way to Germany, and craved the support of the Emperor Henry II (25 December 1012). That monarch, however, after promising him that his case should be carefully examined in accordance with canon law and Roman custom, took away from him the papal insignia which he was wearing, and bade him cease to act as pope in the meanwhile. After this, history knows the "certain Gregory" no more.

Of Benedict VIII, the Catholic Encyclopedia says:

he was, though a layman, imposed on the chair of Peter by force, on May 18, 1012. Nevertheless, dislodging a rival, he became a good and strong ruler...

== See also ==
- Papal selection before 1059
