= Philippe Levillain =

French historian (1940–2021)

- Born: 27 November 1940; Paris, France
- Died: 4 October 2021 (aged 80)
- Occupations: Historian; Professor

Philippe Levillain (27 November 1940 – 4 October 2021) was a French historian and academic. He specialized in the history of Catholicism and the papacy and notably wrote a historic encyclopedia of the papacy.

== Biography ==
Levillain attended the Lycée Montaigne in Bordeaux for secondary school. He then studied at the École normale supérieure and earned an agrégation in history in 1965. He then served as an assistant professor at Paris Nanterre University from 1975 to 1981. He defended his doctoral thesis, Le deuxième concile du Vatican et sa procédure, in 1972 under the direction of René Rémond at Paris Nanterre University. He was then sent to the French School of Rome, where he directed studies in modern and contemporary history from 1977 to 1981. He completed his Doctorate in France in 1979 and became a professor of contemporary history at the Charles de Gaulle University – Lille III, where he stayed from 1982 to 1986. He then spent the remainder of his career at Paris Nanterre University, where he became a professor emeritus.

Levillain was a senior member of the Institut Universitaire de France from 1998 to 2003 and was also a member of the Pontifical Committee for Historical Sciences. He was elected to be a member of the Académie des Sciences Morales et Politiques on 19 December 2011, succeeding the historian Pierre Chaunu. He served as President of the Société de l'histoire de France in 2012. He hosted the radio show Les Lundis de l'Histoire on France Culture from 1982 to 2014.

Levillain died on 4 October 2021 at the age of 80.

== Distinctions ==
- Commander of the Legion of Honour (2016)
- Officer of the Ordre des Palmes académiques
- Officer of the Ordre des Arts et des Lettres
- Grand Officer of the Order of St. Sylvester
- Commander of the Order of the Holy Sepulchre
- Commander of the Order of Merit of the Italian Republic

== Books ==
- Boulanger, fossoyeur de la monarchie (1982)
- Albert de Mun : Catholicisme français et catholicisme romain du syllabus au ralliement (1983)
- Nations et Saint-Siège au xxe siècle (2003)
- Le Moment Benoît XVI (2008)
- Rome n'est plus dans Rome - Mgr Lefebvre et son église (2010)
- La Papauté foudroyée (2015)
- Le Tableau d’honneur (2020)

=== Collaborative books ===
- Paul VI et la modernité dans l'Église (1983)
- Le Vatican ou les frontières de la grâce (with François-Charles Uginet, 1992)
- Dictionnaire historique de la papauté (1994); English translation: The Papacy. An Encyclopedia, Routledge, London 2002
- « Rome, l'unique objet de mon ressentiment », Regards critiques sur la papauté (2011)
