= Ptolemy I of Tusculum =

Roman consul

Ptolemy I (Latin: Ptolemaeus or Italian: Tolomeo; died 1126) was the count of Tusculum in the first quarter of the twelfth century. He was a son of Gregory III. Peter Pisanus, in his Vita Paschalis II refers to Ptolemy and the abbot of Farfa as the allies of the emperor in the same way that the Saints Peter and Paul were the allies of the pope.

He supported the Pope Paschal II and, in 1108, when the pope left for Benevento, he was given command of the Campania. Soon, Ptolemy, along with the Berald of Farfa (abbot of Farfa) and Peter Colonna, rebelled against papal authority. The pope returned with troops from Richard II of Gaeta and the rebels were unable to take control of Rome.

In 1111, the Emperor Henry V imprisoned the pope and some of his cardinals in Rome and Robert I of Capua sent 300 men to rescue the papal entourage. Ptolemy met the Capuan troops at Ferentino and turned them back, however.

In March 1116, the Roman Prefect Peter died and Paschal appointed a son of Pier Leoni as his replacement. The people revolted and appointed Peter, a great nephew of Ptolemy, instead. The pope was forced to flee to Albano, but not before attempting to buy Ptolemy's loyalty with the grant of Ariccia. The pope then turned on Rome and, in May, retook Trastevere and the Fumone fortress. His men captured the Prefect Peter. His relative imprisoned, Ptolemy turned on the pope once more and defeated his militia at Algidius and freed his nephew. This was the catalyst for more widespread revolt in the Campania and the Papal States.

In Easter 1117, the emperor arrived and the pope fled. Ptolemy quickly did homage to the secular despot. He was confirmed in all the possessions of his grandfather the Consul Gregory. His power extended all the way to the Sabina. He held the port of Astura, taken from the Roman church. He was called the dux et consul Romanorum or "Duke and Consul of the Romans" and formally "prince of Latium." At this point, his son was also titled count and this younger Ptolemy was given in marriage to Bertha, illegitimate daughter of Henry.

On 5 February 1105, after wars with Gaeta, Ptolemy had confirmed by a treaty the safety of the Gaetan traders in his domains. Now, the wars with Gaeta were (temporarily) resumed.

Ptolemy and his nephew the prefect were holding the Castel Sant'Angelo. Peter Colonna and Rainald Senebaldi turned to the pope's side and, soon after Christmas, Ptolemy and the rest of the imperialists in the Eternal City were forced to flee by the pope, who soon died.

== Sources ==
- Gregorovius, Ferdinand. Rome in the Middle Ages Vol. IV Part 1. 1905.
- Lexikon des Mittelalters: Ptolemaeus (Tolomeo) I. Graf von Tusculum.
