= Gregory III of Tusculum =

Count of Tusculum

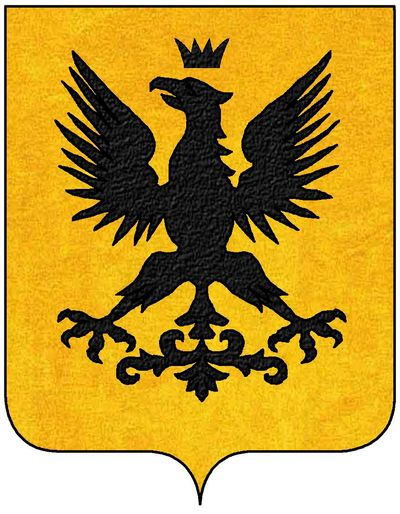
Eagle (aquila) as coats of arm - Counts of Tusculum

Gregory III (died about 1108) was the son of Gregory II. He was the Count of Tusculum from 1058, when his father died. He is usually considered to stand at the fore of the family of the Colonna.

Unlike his father, he did not bear the ducal and senatorial titles, nor any title to Rome, but simply was patricius et consul, (Comes Tusculanensis, Consul, illustris). Gregory was succeeded by his eldest son, Ptolemy I.

He had sons named:

- Ptolemy I (1099–1129)-(Consul comes Tusculanus);
- Gregory IV (1109–1128)-(Iudex Tusculanensis);
- Peter de Columpna (1099–1151) - (Colonna family);
- Egidius (1128–1137);
- Iadara (daughter).
