= Ptolemy II of Tusculum =

12th-century Byzantine nobleman

Ptolemy II (also Ptolemæus or Tolomeo) (died 1153) was the count of Tusculum and consul of the Romans (consul Romanorum) from 1126 to his death. He was the son and successor of Ptolemy I.

The younger Ptolemy entered the political scene of central Italy for the first time in 1117, when he appears as joint count with his father and is given in marriage to Bertha, illegitimate daughter of Henry V, Holy Roman Emperor. At this time, the counts of Tusculum first claimed descent through the gentes Julii and Octavii, a claim Ptolemy continued. The counts were also confirmed in their possession of all the territory of the Consul Gregory, Ptolemy I's grandfather.

When the Emperor Lothair II marched home from Southern Italy in 1137, Ptolemy II met him at Tivoli. There, Lothair confirmed all of Ptolemy's possessions and his title of "Prince of Latium." In turn, Ptolemy gave his son Raino over to the emperor as a pledge of loyalty.

On 8 April 1149, Pope Eugene III took refuge in Ptolemy's Tusculuan fortress. This was the first time in forty years that the count of Tusculum had acted as a true ally of the true pope. At that time, Louis VII of France stopped in Tusculum on return from the Second Crusade. Though shocked by the pope's straits, the king of France did nothing to help the pontiff. On 7 November, Eugene left Tusculum.

In Ptolemy's latter years, his house declined. In 1141, Bertha died and the tie to the old imperial family was broken. Ptolemy married a Pierleoni, a daughter of Petrus Leonis himself. He fell into debts which caused many properties in Tusculum itself to be lost or mortgaged. Many fell to the Frangipani family and the old fortress even fell to Eugene III. Ptolemy died in 1153 and was succeeded by his elder son Jonathan of Tusculum. His second son, the aforementioned Raino, was joint count and then sole count: the last count of Tusculum. Ptolemy did leave another son, named Jordan, who settled in Gavignano in Volscia after the destruction of Tusculum in 1191.

== Sources ==
- Gregorovius, Ferdinand. Rome in the Middle Ages Vol. IV Part 1. 1905.
