= Gregory II of Tusculum =

Count of Tusculum

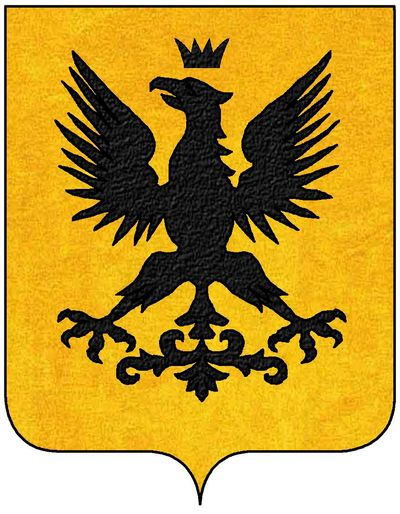
Arms of the Counts of Tusculum

Gregory II (died 1058) was the son of Alberic III of Tusculum and Ermelina. He was the count of Tusculum and the Lateran (Lateranensis et Tusculanensis comes) from 1044 to his death.

The Chronicon Monasterii Casinensis of Leo of Ostia records him as Gregorius de Alberico. The placement of this passage implies his death around 1058. Like his many forefathers, he carried the illustrious title of Romanorum patricius, consul, dux et senator ("Patrician, consul, duke, and senator of the Romans"), implying his secular command over Rome and its militia. His dual comital title implied his land- and fortress-holding power in both Rome itself and Tusculum, as supported by his alliance with the Papacy. In 1044, he led the expedition to restore his brother, Pope Benedict IX.

Before 1054, when he is last attested, Gregory had three sons and a daughter. His daughter, Theodora, married Pandulf (or Landulf), lord of Capaccio (1040–1052), son of Guaimar III of Salerno and Gaitelgrima and brother of Guaimar IV, with whom he was assassinated. Gregory's sons John and Peter died young, but his youngest son, Gregory III, succeeded him.
