= Marozia =

Italian queen

- Senatrix and Patricia of Rome

Queen consort of Italy
- Tenure: 932 - 937
- Born: Maria c. 890; Rome, Papal States
- Died: 937 (aged 46–47); Rome, Papal States
- Spouse: Alberic I of Spoleto; Guy, Margrave of Tuscany; Hugh of Italy
- Issue: by Alberic I Pope John XI; Alberic II of Spoleto; Constantine; Sergius; David; Berta; Theodora (?)
- Father: Theophylact I, Count of Tusculum
- Mother: Theodora

Marozia, born Maria and also known as Mariuccia or Mariozza (c. 890 – 937), was a Roman noblewoman who was the alleged mistress of Pope Sergius III and was given the unprecedented titles senatrix ("senatoress") and patricia of Rome by Pope John X.

[The] influence of two sister prostitutes, Marozia and Theodora (Note: Here Gibbon confused Marozia's mother, Theodora with her sister, Theodora II.) was founded on their wealth and beauty, their political and amorous intrigues: the most strenuous of their lovers were rewarded with the Roman tiara, and their reign may have suggested to darker ages the fable of a female pope. The bastard son, two grandsons, two great grandsons, and one great great grandson of Marozia—a rare genealogy—were seated in the Chair of St. Peter.

— Edward Gibbon, The Decline and Fall of the Roman Empire

From this description, the term "pornocracy" has become associated with the effective rule in Rome of Theodora and her daughter Marozia through male surrogates.

== Early life ==
Marozia was born about 890. She was the daughter of the Roman consul Theophylact, Count of Tusculum, and of Theodora, the real power in Rome, whom bishop Liutprand of Cremona characterized as a "shameless whore... [who] exercised power on the Roman citizenry like a man."

At the age of fifteen, Marozia became the mistress of Theophylact's cousin Pope Sergius III, whom she knew when he was bishop of Portus. The two had a son, John (the later Pope John XI). That, at least, is the story found in two contemporary sources, the Liber Pontificalis and the Antapodosis sive Res per Europam gestae (958–62), by Liutprand of Cremona (c. 920–72). But a third contemporary source, the annalist Flodoard (c. 894–966), says John XI was brother of Alberic II, the latter being the offspring of Marozia and her husband Alberic I. Hence John too may have been the son of Marozia and Alberic I.

Marozia married Alberic I, duke of Spoleto, in 909, and their son Alberic II was born in 911 or 912. By the time Alberic I was killed at Orte in 924, the Roman landowners had won complete victory over the traditional bureaucracy represented by the papal curia. Rome was virtually under secular control, referred to as the historic nadir of the papacy by historian Will Durant.

== Guy of Tuscany ==
In order to counter the influence of Pope John X (whom the hostile chronicler Liutprand of Cremona alleges was another of her lovers), Marozia subsequently married his opponent Guy of Tuscany. Together they attacked Rome, arrested Pope John X in the Lateran, and jailed him in the Castel Sant'Angelo. Either Guy had him smothered with a pillow in 928 or he simply died, perhaps from neglect or ill treatment. Marozia seized power in Rome in a coup d'état. The following popes, Leo VI and Stephen VII, were both her puppets. In 931 she managed to impose her twenty-one-year-old son as pontiff, under the name of John XI.

== Hugh of Arles, and death ==
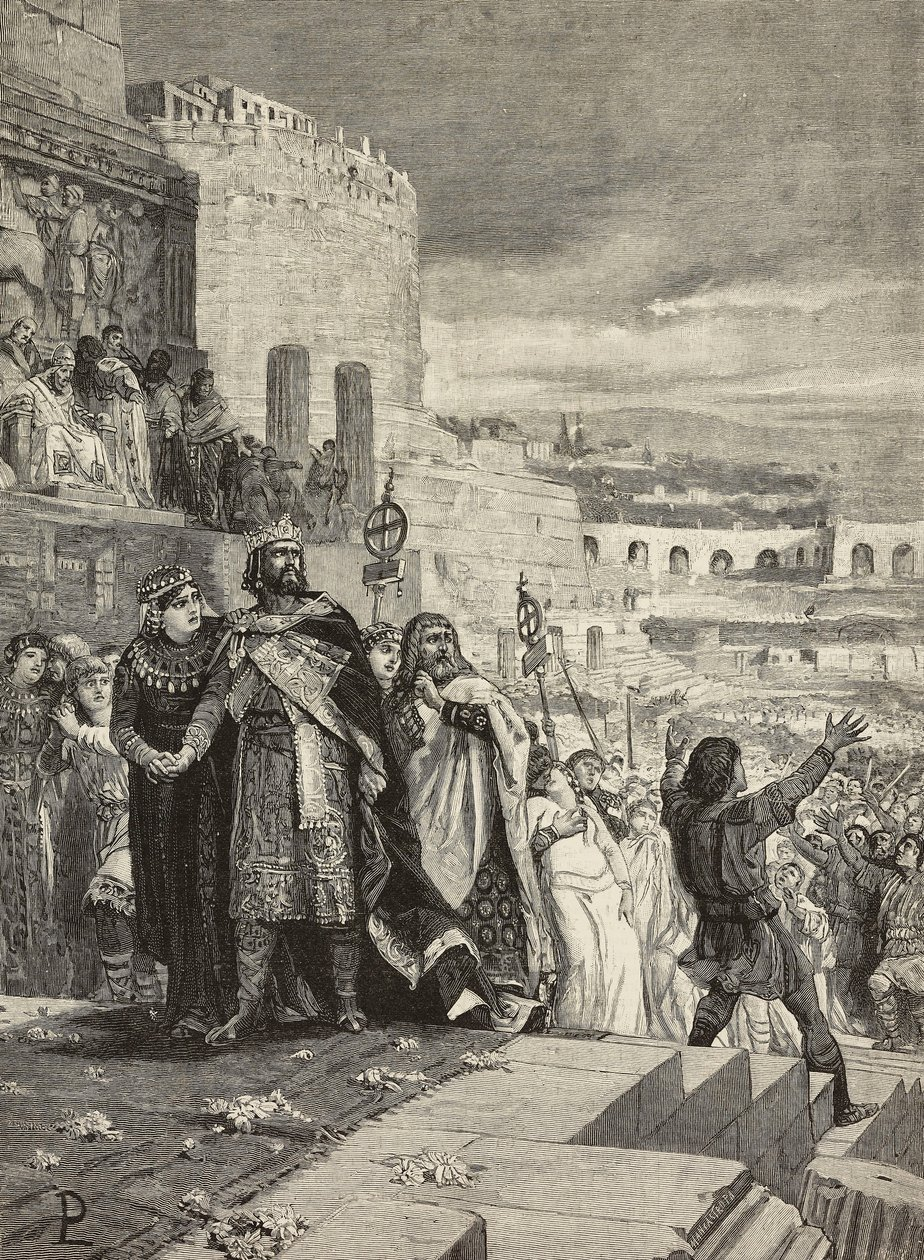
Engraving depicting the wedding of Marozia and Hugh of Italy, from Francesco Bertolini, Historia de Roma.

Guy died in 929, and Marozia negotiated a marriage with his half-brother Hugh of Arles, the King of Italy. While in Rome Hugh quarreled with Marozia's son Alberic II, who organized an uprising during the wedding ceremonies in 932. Hugh escaped, but Marozia was captured.

Marozia died after spending some 5 years in prison. Her descendants remained active in papal politics, starting with Alberic II's son Octavian, who became Pope John XII in 955. Popes Benedict VIII, John XIX, and Benedict IX, and antipope Benedict X of the Counts of Tusculum, were descended from Theodora II, sister of Marozia. By Guy of Tuscany she had a daughter named Berta Theodora, who never married.

== Sources ==
- West-Harling, Veronica (2025). "The visibility of women in tenth-century Rome". Wiley Online Library.
- Chamberlin, E. R. (1969). The Bad Popes. New York: Dial Press. ISBN 9789030041801. OCLC 647415773.
- Williams, George (1998). Papal genealogy, the families and descendants of the popes.
- di Carpegna Falconieri, Tommaso (2008), Marozia, in Dizionario biografico degli italiani, 70, pp. 681–685
- Lloyd, John Edward (1912). A History of Wales from the Earliest Times to the Edwardian Conquest. Vol. 1 (2 ed.). Longmans, Green & Co. "Lloyd history of Wales"
- Gibbon, Edward (1789). The Decline and Fall of the Roman Empire
