= Alberic III of Tusculum =

Count of Tusculum

Alberic III (died 1044) was the Count of Tusculum, along with Galeria, Preneste, and Arce, from 1024, when his brother the count Roman was elected Pope John XIX, until his own death. He was a son of Gregory I and Maria, brother of Popes Benedict VIII and John XIX, and brother-in-law of Thrasimund III of Spoleto.

Alberic used the title of consul, dux et patricius Romanorum: "consul, duke, and patrician of the Romans." This signified his secular authority in Rome. He also bore the titular comes sacri palatii Lateranensis ("Count of the Sacred Lateran Palace"), which signified his ecclesiastical function in the papal curia. During the pontificate of his brother John XIX, he was made a senator, but he had to abandon this title for the aforemention consular dignity in order to avoid tensions with the Emperor Henry II. Alberic does not appear in sources after 1033, when he left the comital powers to his son the newly elected pope.

He married Ermelina and his son Theophylact III (or IV) became Pope Benedict IX in 1032. He was succeeded by his second son Gregory II and left three other sons: the consul, dux et senator Romanorum Peter, Octavian, and Guy, all titled "Count of Tusculum."
