= Benedict of Soracte =

10th-century Italian monk and chronicler

Benedict of Soracte (Benedict of St. Andrew) was a tenth-century Italian chronicler, a monk at the monastery on Mount Soracte. The Catholic Encyclopedia article on Ecclesiastical Annals dates his chronicle to 968, but notes that it "unfortunately, is filled with legends".
