= Pope Sergius III =

Head of the Catholic Church from 904 to 911

- Bishop of Rome
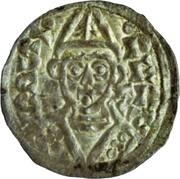
- Denarius of Sergius III
- Church: Catholic Church
- Papacy began: 29 January 904
- Papacy ended: 14 April 911
- Predecessor: Leo V
- Successor: Anastasius III

Personal details
- Born: c. 860 Rome, Papal States
- Died: 14 April 911 Rome, Papal States

Pope Sergius III (c. 860 − 14 April 911) was the bishop of Rome and nominal ruler of the Papal States from 29 January 904 to his death. He was pope during a period of violence and disorder in central Italy, when warring aristocratic factions sought to use the material and military resources of the papacy. At the behest of Theophylact I of Tusculum, Sergius seized the papal throne from Christopher, who in turn had deposed Leo V.

Sergius' reign was subsequently marked by Theophylact's influence. As pope, Sergius continued many ecclesiastical controversies of his predecessors, including conflict over Formosus' legacy, annulling all ordinations made by the late pope, and the filioque controversy with eastern patriarchs. His pontificate was similarly marked by temporal conflicts, with Sergius' refusal to crown Berengar I of Italy as emperor, and his support of Byzantine emperor Leo VI the Wise's fourth marriage. Sergius also saw the restoration of the Lateran Palace.

Sergius III today is largely seen as an unscrupulous character as contemporary records had included a number of accusations against him; Sergius III had reputedly ordered the murder of his two immediate predecessors, Leo V and Christopher, and allegedly fathered an illegitimate son who later became pope, John XI. His pontificate has been variously described as "dismal and disgraceful", and "efficient and ruthless".

== Early life and career ==
Sergius was the son of Benedictus, and traditionally was believed descended from a noble Roman family, although it has been speculated that he was in fact related to the family of Theophylact I of Tusculum. He was ordained as a subdeacon by Pope Marinus I, followed by his being raised to the diaconate by Pope Stephen V. During the pontificate of Pope Formosus (891–896), he was a member of the party of nobles who supported the Emperor Lambert, who was the opponent of Formosus and the pope's preferred imperial candidate, Arnulf of Carinthia. Formosus consecrated Sergius as Bishop of Caere (Cerveteri) in 893, apparently in order to remove him from Rome. Sergius ceased to act as Bishop of Caere with the death of Formosus in 896, as all of the ordinations conferred by Formosus were declared null and void, although Formosus' ordination of Sergius was later reconfirmed by Theodore II. He also actively participated in the farcical Cadaver synod that condemned the pontificate of Formosus.

With the death of Theodore in 898, Sergius, with a small following of Roman nobility led by his father Benedictus, attempted to have himself elected pope, contrary to the wishes of Emperor Lambert, who was also duke of Spoleto. Although Sergius was actually elected, a rival candidate, Pope John IX (898–900), was also elected. With Lambert's support, John was successfully installed as pope, and one of his first acts was to convene a synod which excommunicated Sergius and his followers. Sergius was then forcibly exiled by Lambert, fleeing to his see at Caere, where he placed himself under the protection of Margrave Adalbert II of Tuscany.

== Papal reign ==
By the time the Antipope Christopher (903–904) seized the chair of Saint Peter by force, circumstances had changed at Rome, with the rise of the magister militum Theophylact of Tusculum, who had been stationed at Rome by the retreating Emperor Louis the Blind in 902. Putting himself at the head of a faction of the nobility, Theophylact revolted against Christopher and asked Sergius to return to Rome to become pope. Sergius accepted, and with the armed backing of Adalbert II, he entered Rome, by which stage Christopher had already been cast into prison by Theophylact. Sergius was then consecrated pope on 29 January 904.

Sergius III owed his rise to the power of his new patron Theophylact, and rewarded him with the position of sacri palatii vestararius, the principal official at the top of papal patronage in control of the disbursements, and thus of patronage. All real power now devolved onto Theophylact, and Sergius essentially became his puppet. Perhaps the first clear sign of this shift in power was the fate of Sergius' two predecessors, Pope Leo V and the Antipope Christopher. According to the pro-Formosan Eugenius Vulgarius, Sergius ordered both men to be strangled in prison some time in early 904. That both men were murdered during Sergius' pontificate appears probable, although other accounts state that Christopher at least was allowed to retire to a monastery. Given where the real power lay, it seems more likely that either Theophylact gave the orders directly, or that he directed Sergius to give the orders. For the remainder of his pontificate, Sergius promoted his family and members of his aristocratic party to positions of authority and prominence within the church.

=== Activity in Italy ===
Pope Sergius III convoked a synod which annulled all the ordinations of Formosus and required all bishops ordained by Formosus to be reordained. It was alleged that Sergius managed to get the consent of the Roman clergy at the synod by threatening them with exile, violence or through the use of bribery. The decision to require reordination was very unpopular, and those affected at sees distant from Rome not only ignored the synod's instructions but wrote letters both condemning the revoking of ordinations and justifying the validity of the original ordinations.

Confirming his continued support of the anti-Formosus faction, Sergius honoured the murdered Pope Stephen VI (896–897), who had been responsible for the "Cadaver Synod" that had condemned and mutilated the corpse of Pope Formosus, by writing a laudatory epitaph on Stephen VI's tombstone. For centuries it was believed that Sergius then had the much-abused corpse of Formosus exhumed once more, tried, found guilty again, and beheaded, thus in effect conducting a second Cadaver Synod. However, the source for this was Liutprand of Cremona, who mistakenly placed the cadaver synod in the pontificate of Sergius III, instead of Stephen VI.

Although neither Sergius nor Theophylact supported the continued nominal rule of Emperor Louis the Blind, they were somewhat unwilling to grant the imperial title to the only other contender, Berengar I of Italy. On the one occasion that Sergius agreed to crown Berengar in around 906, Berengar was prevented from reaching Rome by the forces of Alberic I of Spoleto and Adalbert II of Tuscany, both of whom had been supporters of Sergius, but were unhappy with his decision to support Berengar. Nevertheless, Berengar's unwillingness to control his vassals also contributed to the papal reluctance; when Albuinus, the margrave of Istria, began taking papal territory off John, the archbishop of Ravenna, in 907, Sergius had written to Albuinus asking for him to desist. When Sergius was ignored, the pope wrote to the bishop of Pola in 910, making it clear that: "he would never bestow the (imperial) crown on Berenger till he promised to take the (Istrian) March from Albuinus, and give it to some better man."

Sergius rebuilt the Lateran Palace, which had been shattered by an earthquake in 896, and then stripped of its treasures by the Antipope Christopher. Sergius refurbished it with objects, images and crucifixes, and decorated its newly built walls with frescos. In 905 he provided funds to the Church of Silva Candida, which had been devastated by a Saracen raid. He also helped with the rebuilding of Nonantola Abbey, which had suffered attacks from the Magyars, and finally he granted privileges to some monasteries and churches in West and East Francia.

=== Relations with Constantinople ===
Sergius, like his predecessors, continued to defend the Filioque interpolation into the Nicene Creed, which was at odds with the position of the eastern church. Papal legates who attended the Synod of Trosle in June 909 attacked the Byzantine position, which the synod then condemned in the fourteenth canon:

Sane quia innotuit nobis sancta sedes apostolica adhuc errores blasphemiasque cuiusdam vigere Photii in partibus orientis in spiritum sanctum, quod non a filio, nisi tantum a patre procedat, blasphemantis. Hortamur vestram fraternitatem una mecum, ut secundum admonitionem domni Romanæ sedis præsulis singuli nostrum perspectis patrum catholicorum sententiis de divinæ scripturæ pharetris acutas proferamus sagittas potentis ad confodiendam beluam monstri renascentis et ad conterebrandum caput nequissimi serpentis.

As the Holy Apostolic See has made known to us that the blasphemous errors of a certain Photius against the Holy Ghost are still vigorous in the East, errors which teach that the Holy Spirit proceeds not from the Son but from the Father only we exhort you venerable brethren, together with us, in accordance with the admonition of the ruler of the Roman See, after a careful study of the works of the Fathers, to draw from the quiver of Holy Writ arrows sharp enough to slay the monster which is again springing into life.

Almost a century later, this decision led to the removal of Sergius's name from the Diptychs by Patriarch Sergius II of Constantinople.

However, the major issue with Constantinople that presented itself during Sergius' pontificate was the question over the fourth marriage of the Byzantine Emperor Leo VI the Wise. Both the emperor, who wanted to marry Zoe Karbonopsina, and the patriarch of Constantinople, Nicholas Mystikos, appealed to Sergius; the pope sent legates to Constantinople, who confirmed the pope's ruling in favour of the emperor, on the grounds that fourth marriages had not been condemned by the Church as a whole. Nicholas' refusal to accept this ruling saw him deposed by Leo VI, upon which he too appealed to Sergius, claiming his deposition was unjustified.

=== Alleged affair with Marozia ===
Sergius' ties with the family of Theophylact were made even closer, at least according to rumour, by Sergius' supposed affair with Theophylact's daughter, Marozia. This relationship was promoted by Marozia's mother, Theodora, and the result of this affair was a male child who in time became Pope John XI (931–935). The only source of this alleged affair is the chronicler Liutprand of Cremona, writing some 50 years after the events of Sergius' pontificate. Neither Auxilius of Naples nor Eugenius Vulgarius, both of whom were exact contemporaries of Sergius, and both of whom were hostile towards Sergius for his attacks on Formosus, mention this allegation at all. The highly reliable chronicler Flodoard, who also is a contemporary does not mention it either. It should also be noted that Liutprand, as a firm supporter of Emperor Otto I was often heavily biased against the papacy.

The affair, while not an impossibility, would certainly not have persisted beyond Marozia's marriage to Alberic I of Spoleto in 909. The question of whether Theophylact and Theodora needed to tie Sergius to them by such means, particularly when Sergius was already deeply indebted to them for his elevation to the papacy, as well as wasting Marozia in a relationship when, as the daughter of an important house, she would have been a valuable tool to link via marriage to another noble house, is open to debate. The birth of the future John XI in 910, after her marriage to Alberic, would seem to indicate that Sergius was not the father.

=== Death ===
Sergius III died on 14 April 911, and was succeeded by Pope Anastasius III. He was buried in the Church of St. Peter, between the Silver gate and the gate of Ravenna.

== Legacy ==
Much of Sergius' pontificate has been maligned throughout history, principally through the reporting of his character and the state of Rome at the time by Liutprand of Cremona. His recounting of the period has led sixteenth-century cardinal and historian Caesar Baronius in his Annales Ecclesiastici to call it the Saeculum obscurum, or dark century. Similarly 19th-century Protestant historians saw this period as a "pornocracy", or "rule of the harlots", a reversal of the natural order as they saw it, according to Liber pontificalis and a later chronicler who was also biased against Sergius III. This "pornocracy" was an age with women in power: Theodora, whom Liutprand characterized as a "shameless whore... [who] exercised power on the Roman citizenry like a man" and her daughter Marozia, the mother of Pope John XI and reputed to be the mistress of Sergius III, largely upon a remark by Liutprand.

Caesar Baronius, writing in the 16th century, and basing himself on Liutprand, was particularly scathing, describing Sergius as: "a wretch, worthy of the rope and of fire... flames could not have caused this execrable monster to suffer the punishments which he merited. It is impossible to believe that such a pope was a lawful one." The reality is that when Sergius was forcibly exiled by Lambert of Spoleto, all the official records were destroyed; consequently, most of the surviving documentation about Sergius comes from his pro-Formosan opponents who had fled to Naples. Horace Mann, writing in the Catholic Encyclopedia states the following concerning the alleged illicit relationship of Pope Sergius III with Marozia: "that he put his two predecessors to death, and by illicit relations with Marozia had a son, who was afterwards John XI, must be regarded as highly doubtful. These assertions are only made by bitter or ill-informed adversaries, and are inconsistent with what is said of him by respectable contemporaries."

Nevertheless, most modern opinions about Sergius' pontificate remain poor. According to Horace K. Mann, "Sergius was, unfortunately, a pronounced party-man, and anxious for the supremacy of his party". The best that Ferdinand Gregorovius could say of him was: "That Sergius, who remained Pope throughout the storms of seven years, was at least a man of energy must be admitted, although apostolic virtues are scarcely to be looked for in a character such as his". James S. Packer described him as malignant and ferocious, slaughtering his enemies with a private army, while Walter Ullmann described Sergius as a typical representative of the House of Theophylact, concerned with power and sexual liaisons.

== See also ==
- List of popes

== Notes ==
Catholic Church titles
Preceded by Leo V	Pope; 904–911	Succeeded by Anastasius III
