= Theophylact I of Tusculum =

Medieval Italian noble

Theophylact I (before 864 – 924/925) was a medieval count of Tusculum who was the effective ruler of Rome from around 905 through to his death in 924. His descendants controlled the papacy for the next 100 years.

== Biography ==
The origins of Theophylact are unknown and debated. He might have been descended from Theophylact, who was the son of Pope John VIII's nomenclator Gregory. This Theophylact was initially aligned with Pope Formosus, but later supported anti-Formosus leaders.

Theophylact was the hereditary count of Tusculum, a small hill town near the vicinity of Rome. He is mentioned for the first time in a document of 901 as palatine iudex (palace judge, or leader of the militia) of Emperor Louis the Blind. He remained in Rome, commanding a group of soldiers after the emperor's return to Provence in 902, and was prominent in the overthrow of Antipope Christopher in January 904, whom he very likely ordered to be killed whilst in prison later that year. Theophylact formed an alliance with Duke Alberic I of Spoleto, and with their combined backing, Pope Sergius III was elected in Christopher's place. During his pontificate, Theophylact became Sergius’ sacri palatii vestararius and magister militum, effectively seizing control of the city. He was also granted other honorific titles, such as senator, glorissimus dux, and dominus urbis.

Sometime between the end of Sergius III's pontificate and the start of John X's, Theophylact was elected the head of Rome, under the centuries-old title of Roman consul by the city's nobility. Like the ancient office, this consulship must have been for a year only, as in 915, he is referred to as a senator only, although first among the listed nobility. In this capacity, Theophylact was able to dominate the papal electoral process, with all popes until his death in 925 chosen after he had hand-picked them.

Theophylact's rule of Rome was shared to a large degree with his wife Theodora, who was styled senatrix and serenissima vestaratrix of Rome. It was by her suggestion that the popes who followed Sergius III, Anastasius III and Lando, were chosen by her husband for the papal see. Then in 914, she prevailed upon him to support her alleged lover as pope, having him installed as John X (although it has been suggested that John was in fact related to either Theodora or Theophylact). Theophylact worked closely with the able John X, who supported Theophylact's overall objectives with regards to strengthening the imperial presence in Italy by supporting Berengar I of Italy. He fought alongside John X against the Saracens at the Battle of Garigliano in 915, and was the pope's principal political support until his death in either 924 or 925.

Theophylact had two daughters with Theodora: Marozia and Theodora. In the longer term, the heirs of Theophylact, the Tusculani, were the rivals of the Crescentii in controlling Rome, and placed several popes on the Chair of St Peter. Their eventual heirs were the Colonna family.

Theophylact's ally Alberic I married Marozia sometime near the Battle of Garigliano in 915. This marriage produced Alberic II of Spoleto, who ruled over Rome from 932 to 954. Liutprand of Cremona, an opponent of Theophylact's family, claimed that Marozia had an affair with Pope Sergius III and gave birth to Pope John XI, but modern historians, such as Pietro Fedele and Louis Duchesne, dismiss this claim as common gossip used in papal discussions.

== Reputation ==
It is now believed that Theodora's influence over Theophylact was overstated by contemporary chroniclers such as Liutprand of Cremona, who wished to exaggerate the corruption of the Roman and papal court, as a counterpoint to rulers such as Alberic I of Spoleto, and the future emperor Otto I, whom Liutprand later served. The charges of adultery against Theodora, the use of the term "harlot", and the presumption that she was using her "feminine wiles" to prostitute herself in order to influence her husband and appoint numerous lovers to important posts were used to tarnish the rule of Theophylact and his successors. Later historians, influenced by the moral tone of this critique, described the influence of Theodora and her descendants over the papacy as the "pornocracy" or the "Rule of the Harlots". Modern historians now instead use the term saeculum obscurum to describe the period when the papacy was under the direct control of the Roman nobility, in particular when it was under the domination of the family of Theophylact.

== Works cited ==
- Osborne, John (2025). Rome in the Tenth Century: A History in Art. Cambridge University Press. ISBN 9781009639705.
- Williams, George L. (25 August 2004). Papal Genealogy: The Families and Descendants of the Popes. Jefferson, North Carolina: McFarland & Company. ISBN 978-0-7864-2071-1.
- Gregorovius, Ferdinand (1895). History of the city of Rome in the middle ages. Vol. 3. Translated by Hamilton, Annie. London: George Bell & Sons.
- Brook, Lindsay (January 2003). "Popes and pornocrats: Rome in the early middle ages" (PDF). Foundations. 1 (1). Hereford, UK: Foundation for Medieval Genealogy: 5–21.
