= Antipope Benedict X =

Italian anti-pope (11th century)

- Elected: 5 April 1058
- Papacy began: 5 April 1058
- Papacy ended: 24 January 1059
- Predecessor: Roman claimant: Stephen IX; Antipapal claimant: Gregory VI
- Successor: Roman claimant: Nicholas II; Antipapal claimant: Honorius II
- Other posts: Bishop of Tusculum; Cardinal of the Roman Catholic Church; Bishop of Velletri

Personal details
- Died: between 1073 and 1080 Basilica of Sant'Agnese fuori le mura
- Buried: Basilica of Sant'Agnese

Benedict X (died 1073/1080), born Giovanni, was elected to succeed Pope Stephen IX on 5 April 1058, but was opposed by a rival faction that elected Nicholas II. He fled Rome on 24 January 1059 and is today generally regarded as an antipope.

He was a son of Guido, Lord of Poli, who was the youngest son of Alberic III, Count of Tusculum, a member of the dominant political dynasty in the region at that time. Giovanni was a nephew of the notorious Pope Benedict IX, who was deposed in 1048. Benedict X reportedly later was given the nickname of Mincius (thin) due to his ignorance. His mother was present at his trial in April 1060.

== Biography ==
Giovanni, Bishop of Velletri, was created a cardinal by Pope Leo IX in 1050. He was highly esteemed, however, by those who wanted to reform the Church, and was one of five men proposed by Cardinal Frederick of Lorraine when consulted during the summer of 1057 concerning a possible successor to Pope Victor II, whom Frederick himself succeeded as Pope Stephen IX. Pope Victor had died at Arezzo on 28 July 1057, where he had just held a synod, but his successor was elected in Rome, in the Basilica of S. Pietro in vincoli, on 2 August 1057 and consecrated the next day.

In less than a year, Stephen IX (Frederick of Lorraine) created thirteen new cardinals. Peter Damian was a native of Ravenna and had been educated in northern Italy. Ubderto Poggi was from Poggio (now Poggio Lucenzio), in the duchy of Lucca. Bruno, cardinal priest of S. Sabina, was from Germany. Ugobaldo degli Obizi came from Lucca. The Benedictine Alberic came from the neighborhood of Benevento. Of the more senior cardinals, Boniface of Albano was from Apulia, Hugo of Silva Candida was a Burgundian, and Stephen of S. Crisogono was a monk of Cluny.

In 1058, Pope Stephen was relieved, by force on the part of the Romans, of the treasure which he had brought to Rome from Constantinople, in the wake of his participation in the embassy which excommunicated the Patriarch Michael Cerularius and began the Great Schism. He transferred the remaining treasure to Montecassino, and then hastened into Tuscany, in order to consult with his elder brother Godfrey, whom he had enfeoffed as Duke of Spoleto in January 1058. It was even suggested that Stephen intended to make his brother emperor. He suddenly grew weak, and died in Florence on 29 March 1058. It is said that he was given poison on the journey by an agent of the Romans. The Romans also asserted that Godfrey had dispatched 500 troops and money to regain control of Rome, which motivated the Romans to act.

Pope Stephen, before he left Rome, issued a decree, in the presence of the bishops, clergy, and people of Rome, that no election was to be held until the return of Cardinal Hildebrand from a mission to Germany, under penalty of anathematization. Hildebrand (later Pope Gregory VII) had been sent to the court of Empress Agnes, who had questioned the validity of Stephen's own election. A somewhat different version of the story has it that Pope Stephen summoned the bishops, cardinals, and deacons, and informed them that he knew that some of them were planning to fill the papal seat with the help of lay persons, not in accordance with the decrees of the holy fathers. The assembled clergy then swore that they would never consent to someone becoming pope except in accordance with canon law.

=== Enthroned as pope ===
News of Pope Stephen's death was brought to Rome by two cardinal-bishops, Humbert of Silva Candida and Peter of Tusculum. A section of the Roman aristocracy, along with numerous members of the clergy who were opposed to the reforms being pushed by the German popes and Cardinal Hildebrand, engineered a coup. The leaders were Rome's traditional leaders for more than a century, Gregory, the son of Alberic of Tusculum and brother of Pope Benedict IX; Count Gerard of Galeria, the son of Rainerius; and members of the Monticelli branch of the Crescentius family from Tivoli. On the night of 4–5 April, they forced their way into Rome with large forces, and seized control, establishing a "tyranny", in the words of their enemies. Cardinal Giovanni, Bishop of Tusculum, was enthroned, unwillingly, as pope, on 5 April 1058. His election, it is stated, was arranged by his own family. Since he was already a bishop, he did not need to be consecrated, only enthroned. Cardinal Peter Damiani and his supporters in the reform party, objected loudly to the proceedings and began to cast anathemas. At length, he and his followers fled in terror. Cardinal Humbert and Cardinal Peter of Tusculum, who witnessed the disorders of April 5, fled to Benevento a few days later. As a result, a number of cardinals alleged that the election was irregular. These cardinals were soon moved to flee Rome.

When Hildebrand heard of Benedict's election during his return journey from the German court, he decided to oppose it. He went to Florence where he obtained the support of Godfrey, Duke of Lorraine, Duke of Spoleto, and Marquis of Tuscany for the election of Gerhard of Burgundy, Archbishop of Florence, as pope instead. Godfrey was the elder brother of the recently deceased Pope Stephen IX. Support for this was given by Empress Agnes. Those cardinals who had opposed Benedict's election met at Siena in December 1058, and elected Gerhard, who then took the name of Nicholas II.

=== Deposition ===
Nicholas then proceeded towards Rome, along the way holding a synod at Sutri, where he pronounced Benedict deposed and excommunicated. The supporters of Nicholas then gained control of Rome, and forced Benedict to flee to the castle of Count Gerard of Galeria. Having arrived in Rome, Nicholas was crowned as pope on 24 January 1059. He then proceeded to wage war against Benedict and his supporters, with the assistance of Norman forces based in southern Italy, after he agreed to recognize Count Richard of Aversa as ruler of Capua. An initial battle was fought in Campagna in early 1059, which was not wholly successful for Nicholas; but later that same year, his forces conquered Praeneste, Tusculum and Nomento, and then attacked Galéria, forcing Benedict to surrender and to renounce the papacy in the Fall of that year.

After he returned to Rome, Archdeacon Hildebrand interrogated the cardinals about their behavior in regard to the oath they had taken, not to elect a pope until he had returned from his embassy to the German court. Some did not defend themselves, saying that it was not done well, and that those who enthroned Benedict did not do so with their consent. Others defended themselves, saying, "Since he was good, wise, humble, chaste, kindly, and whatever else is found in a good person was found in him, what we did we believe that we did well." The disagreement between them and Hildebrand continued. One of those cardinals, Peter Damiani, testified independently to Benedict's character, stating that he was bene litteratus, with a lively personality, chaste and with no suspicion, and generous in giving charity.

Benedict was allowed to go free, departing from the Lateran Palace a few days before the consecration of Nicholas II (24 January 1059). He retired to one the castle of Passerani (a suburb of Rieti), which was held by Regetellus, the son of the Prefect Crescentius, and from there to Galeria (not far from Bracciano), which was held by Count Gerard, the son of Rainerius. In March 1060 he returned to Rome and took up residence in his own house near S. Maria Maggiore, where he remained for thirty days. Then the Archdeacon Hildebrand arrested him by force, and brought him along with himself to the Lateran, where the council was in session. Pope Nicholas deemed his submission inadequate and had him publicly tried in April 1060, with Hildebrand serving as his prosecutor. Hildebrand put a document into Benedict's hands, and demanded that he read it aloud and sign it. Benedict refused, unwilling to accuse himself and saying it had nothing to do with himself. With tears and lamentations, he was forced to read it. Despite Benedict's pleading that he had been forced to assume the papal crown, he was convicted, deposed, and stripped of all his titles and his ordination as priest and bishop. He was further sentenced to confinement in the guest house ('hospitium') attached to the Basilica of Sant'Agnese fuori le mura.

Suppus, the Archpriest of S. Anastasia, who was the spiritual advisor of Pope Nicholas II, requested that he show Benedict indulgence, and thereupon Benedict was restored to the post of Lector.

He died, still in confinement, sometime during the reign of Gregory VII, between 1073 and 1080. The Archpriest Seppus went to Pope Gregory to inform him of the death and the ceremonies with which they had buried him. Gregory burst out, saying they should have buried him with pontifical honors, and on the pope's orders, he was interred with those honors in the Basilica of Saint Agnes.

=== Aftermath ===
The most important consequence of these events was the adoption of new regulations for papal elections, laid out at a synod presided over by Pope Nicholas in the Lateran Palace at Easter 1059. It was attended by 113 bishops and other clergy. It limited the vote in a papal election to the cardinal Bishops, and the right of approval to the College of Cardinals. The imperial sanction, whether obtained before an election or after one, was eliminated. This was a major step in depriving the lower clergy, the nobility, and Roman citizenry from their role in the election of future popes. Additionally, the diocese which Benedict had held as Bishop of Velletri was given in administration to the Bishop of Ostia in the bull of Pope Alexander II "Si Extraneis", dated 11 June 1065. Ca. 1150, Pope Eugenius III permanently combined the two dioceses into one.

Benedict X was never considered a legitimate pope, having been condemned as an antipope in the Synod of Sutri in 1059. However, several lists of popes down until the time of Pope Honorius III in the thirteenth century listed his name. The Liber Pontificalis assigns him a reign of eight months and twenty days, which would be 5 April to 24 December 1058. Nicholas II was consecrated on 24 January 1059.

== See also ==
- Papal selection before 1059

== Bibliography ==
- Gregorovius, Ferdinand (1896). History of the City of Rome in the Middle Ages. Vol. IV, Part I. London: G. Bell & sons. pp. 110–119.
- Kelly, J. N. D. and Walsh, M. J. (2010). Oxford Dictionary of Popes. second ed. Oxford: Oxford University Press. P. 151.
- Mann, Horace Kinder (1910). The Lives of the Popes in the Early Middle Ages. Vol. VI: 1049—1073. London: Kegan Paul, Trench, Trübner. pp. 220–232.
- Watterich, I. M. (1862). Pontificum Romanorum qui fuerunt inde ab exeunte saeculo IX usque ad finem saeculi XIII vitae (in Latin). Vol. Tom. I. Leipzig: Engelmann. pp. 203–205.
