= Pope John XI =

Head of the Catholic Church from 931 to 935

- Bishop of Rome
- Church: Catholic Church
- Papacy began: March 931
- Papacy ended: December 935
- Predecessor: Stephen VII
- Successor: Leo VII

Orders
- Created cardinal: March 931 by Pope Stephen VII

Personal details
- Born: 910 Rome, Papal States
- Died: December 935 (aged 24–25) Rome, Papal States
- Parents: Alberic I of Spoleto or Sergius III; Marozia

Pope John XI (Latin: Ioannes XI; 910 – December 935) was the bishop of Rome and nominal ruler of the Papal States from March 931 to his death. The true ruler of Rome at the time was his mother, Marozia, followed by his brother Duke Alberic II of Spoleto. His pontificate occurred during the period known as Saeculum obscurum.

== Parentage ==
John was the son of Marozia, the most powerful woman in Rome and the wife of Duke Alberic I of Spoleto at the time of John's birth. According to hostile chronicler Liutprand of Cremona and the Liber Pontificalis, John's father was not Alberic but Marozia's lover Pope Sergius III. However, neither Auxilius of Naples nor Eugenius Vulgarius, both of whom were exact contemporaries of Sergius, and both of whom were hostile towards Sergius for his attacks on Formosus, mention this allegation at all. The highly reliable chronicler Flodoard also refers to John as the brother of Alberic II, and does not mention the allegation either.

Ferdinand Gregorovius, Ernst Dümmler, Thomas Greenwood, Philip Schaff, and Rudolf Baxmann accept Liutprand's account. Horace Kinder Mann considers this story "highly doubtful", highlighting Liutprand's bias. Reginald L. Poole, Peter Llewelyn, Karl Josef von Hefele, August Friedrich Gfrörer, Ludovico Antonio Muratori, and Francis Patrick Kenrick also maintain that Pope John XI was sired by Alberic I of Spoleto.

== Pontificate ==
Marozia was the de facto ruler of Rome at the time and she used her power and influence to ensure that John, who held the titulus of Santa Maria in Trastevere, was elected to the papacy in March 931. Following the overthrow of Marozia and her husband Hugh of Italy around late 932, John XI fell under the control of his brother Alberic II. After being initially imprisoned, he was confined to the Lateran Palace for the remainder of his pontificate. During this time only authority left to John was the exercise of his purely spiritual duties. All other jurisdiction was exercised through Alberic II. This was not only the case in secular, but also in ecclesiastical affairs.

Following the deposition of the Patriarch of Constantinople Tryphon in September 931, the Byzantine emperor Romanos I Lekapenos attempted to get his young son Theophylactus placed on the Patriarchal throne. Due to internal church resistance, Romanos approached John XI to seek the Pope's confirmation and to approve Theophylactus taking the pallium. This was eventually granted by John in February 933. This delay of over a year is seen by Horace Mann as evidence of the Pope's initial reluctance to agree to the emperor's request, and was only forced to do it at his brother Alberic II's insistence following the fall of Marozia. However, as negotiations also involved a suggested marriage between a sister of Alberic and John's and one of Romanos's sons, such a delay would not be unusual, and in fact it is possible that these marriage negotiations were actually begun by Marozia herself and this policy was continued jointly by her sons.

It was also at Alberic II's insistence that the pallium was also granted to Archbishop Artold of Reims in 933, setting up a conflict with the incumbent archbishop Hugh of Vermandois and his supporters. John was kept a virtual prisoner in the Lateran until his death.

John XI sat in the Chair of Peter during what some traditional Catholic sources consider its deepest humiliation, subjugated under the authority of the Prince of Rome, but it was also he who granted many privileges to the Congregation of Cluny, which was later a powerful agent of Church reform.

Catholic Church titles
Preceded by Stephen VII	Pope; 931–935	Succeeded by Leo VII
