= List of popes =

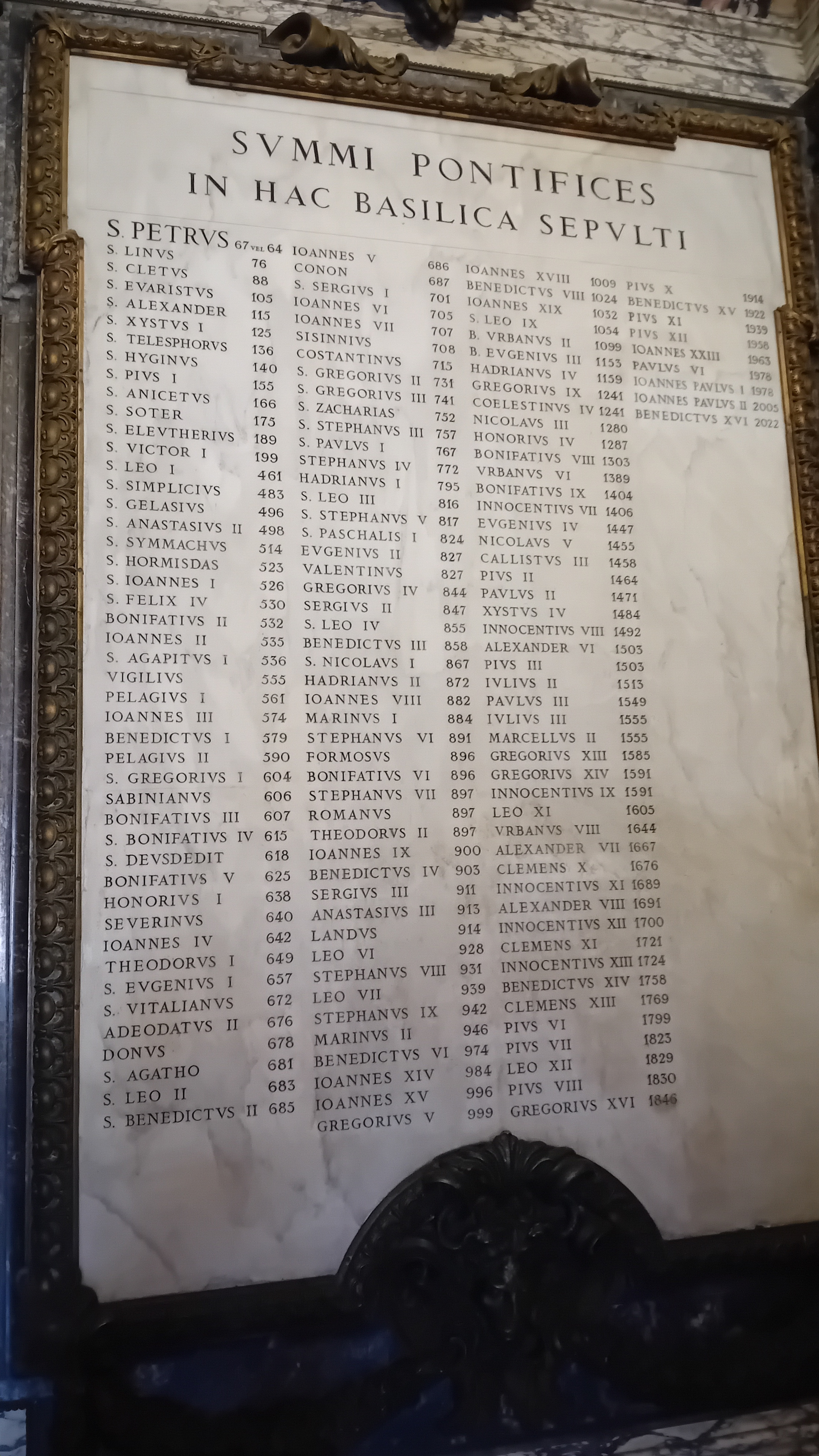
Plaque commemorating the popes buried in St. Peter's Basilica (their names in Latin and the year of their burial), 2024

This chronological list of the popes of the Catholic Church corresponds to that given in the Annuario Pontificio under the heading "I Sommi Pontefici Romani" (The Roman Supreme Pontiffs), excluding those that are explicitly indicated as antipopes. Published every year by the Roman Curia, the Annuario Pontificio no longer identifies popes by regnal number, stating that it is impossible to decide which pope represented the legitimate succession at various times. The 2001 edition of the Annuario Pontificio introduced "almost 200 corrections to its existing biographies of the popes, from St Peter to John Paul II". The corrections concerned dates, especially in the first two centuries, birthplaces and the family name of one pope.

The term pope (Latin: papa, lit. 'father') is used in several churches to denote their high spiritual leaders (for example Coptic pope). This title is usually used in English to refer to the head of the Catholic Church. The Catholic pope uses various titles by tradition, including Summus Pontifex, Pontifex Maximus, and Servus servorum Dei. Each title has been added by unique historical events, and unlike other papal prerogatives, may be modified.

Hermannus Contractus may have been the first historian to number the popes continuously. His list ends in 1049 with Leo IX as number 152. Several changes were made to the list during the 20th century. Christopher was considered a legitimate pope for a long time but was removed due to how he obtained the papacy. Pope-elect Stephen was listed as Stephen II until the 1961 edition, when his name was removed. The decisions of the Council of Pisa (1409) were reversed in 1963 in a reinterpretation of the Western Schism, extending Gregory XII's pontificate to 1415 and classifying rival claimants Alexander V and John XXIII as antipopes.

A significant number of these popes have been recognized as saints, including 48 out of the first 50 consecutive popes, and others are in the sainthood process. Of the first 31 popes, 28 died as martyrs.

== Chronological list of popes ==
=== 1st millennium ===
==== 1st century ====
The chronology of the early popes is heavily disputed. The first ancient lists of popes were not written until the late 2nd century, after the monarchical episcopate had already developed in Rome. These first lists combined contradictory traditions, and even the succession of the first popes is disputed. The first certain dates are AD 222 and 235, the elections of Urban I and Anterus. The years given for the first 30 popes follow the work of Richard Adelbert Lipsius, which often show a 3-year difference with the traditional dates given by Eusebius of Caesarea. These are also the dates used by the Catholic Encyclopedia.

Popes of the 1st century
| Pontiff number | Pontificate | Name: English · Latin | Date and place of birth | Age at start/ end | Notes |
|---|---|---|---|---|---|
| 1 | c. 30 – c. 64 (34 years) | St Peter; PETRVS | Bethsaida, Gaulanitis, Herodian tetrarchy (Note: No longer inhabited; These lands were annexed into Roman Syria by the Roman Empire during his pontificate.) | | Born Simon, son of Jonah. A Jewish peregrinus, free provincial subject of the Roman Empire who was not a Roman citizen. Feast day (Feast of Saints Peter and Paul) 29 June. Apostle of Jesus. According to Catholic tradition, he received the keys of the Kingdom of Heaven (Matthew 16:18–19). The Catholic Church recognizes him as the first bishop of Rome appointed by Jesus and therefore the first pope. Also revered as a saint in Eastern Christianity, with a feast day of 29 June. St. Peter's Basilica in Vatican City is named after him. |
| 2 | c. 64 – c. 76 (?) (12 years) | St Linus; LINVS | Volterrae, Italia, Roman Empire (Note: Now Volterra, Italy) | | First Roman pope. Roman citizen, born in Italia, the homeland of the ancient Romans. (Note: Roman citizenship was given to the rest of the Italians by the end of the Social War in 87 BC.) Feast day 23 September. Also revered as a saint in Eastern Christianity, with a feast day of 7 June. Possibly mentioned in the New Testament (Second Epistle to Timothy 4:21). |
| 3 | c. 76 – c. 88 (?) (12 years) | St Anacletus; ANACLETVS | Athenae, Achaea, Roman Empire (Note: Now Athens, Greece) | | First Greek pope. A peregrinus, free provincial subject of the Roman Empire who was not a Roman citizen. Feast day 26 April. Once erroneously split into Cletus and Anacletus. Also revered as a saint in Eastern Christianity, with the same feast day. |
| 4 | c. 88 – c. 97 (?) (9 years) | St Clement I CLEMENS | Roma, Italia, Roman Empire (Note: Now Rome, Italy) | | Roman citizen, born in the capital of the Roman Empire. Feast day 23 November. The earliest Apostolic Father; issued First Clement, which is said to be the basis of apostolic authority for the clergy. Also revered as a saint in Eastern Christianity, with a feast day of 25 November. Possibly mentioned in the New Testament (Epistle to the Philippians 4:3). He was martyred by being tied to an anchor and being thrown into the sea. |
| 5 | c. 97 – c. 105 (?) (8 years) | St Evaristus; EVARISTVS | Bethlehem, Judaea, Roman Empire (Note: Now Bethlehem, Palestine) | | A Hellenized Jew. A peregrinus, free provincial subject of the Roman Empire who was not a Roman citizen. Feast day of 26 October. Said to have divided Rome into parishes, assigning a priest to each. |

==== 2nd century ====
Popes of the 2nd century
| Pontiff number | Pontificate | Name: English · Latin | Date and place of birth | Age at start/ end | Notes |
|---|---|---|---|---|---|
| 6 | c. 105 – c. 115 (?) (10 years) | St Alexander I ALEXANDER | Roma, Italia, Roman Empire | | Roman citizen, born in the capital of the Roman Empire. Feast day 3 May. Inaugurated the custom of blessing houses with holy water. Also revered as a saint in Eastern Christianity, with a feast day of 18 March. |
| 7 | c. 115 – c. 125 (10 years) | St Sixtus I XYSTVS | c. 42 Roma, Italia, Roman Empire | | A Roman of Greek descent, born in Italia, the homeland of the ancient Romans. Uncertain if he was a peregrinus (a free subject of the Roman Empire) or a Roman citizen. Feast day 6 April. Also revered as a saint in Eastern Christianity, with a feast day of 10 August. |
| 8 | c. 125 – c. 136 (11 years) | St Telesphorus; TELESPHORVS | Terra Nova, Italia, Roman Empire (Note: Now Terranova da Sibari, Italy) | | A Roman of Greek descent, born in Italia, the homeland of the ancient Romans. Uncertain if he was a peregrinus (a free subject of the Roman Empire) or a Roman citizen. Feast day 5 January. Church Father St. Irenaeus called him a great martyr; the earliest attested martyrdom of pope after St. Peter. Also revered as a saint in Eastern Christianity, with a feast day of 22 February. |
| 9 | c. 136 – c. 140 (4 years) | St Hyginus; HYGINVS | Athenae, Achaea, Roman Empire | | Greek. A peregrinus, free provincial subject of the Roman Empire who was not a Roman citizen. Tradition holds he was martyred; feast day 11 January. |
| 10 | c. 140 – c. 155 (15 years) | St Pius I PIVS | Aquileia, Italia, Roman Empire (Note: Now Aquileia, Italy) | | Roman citizen, born in Italia, the homeland of the ancient Romans. Brother of the freedman Hermas. Martyred by sword; feast day 11 July. Decreed that Easter should only be celebrated on a Sunday. |
| 11 | c. 155 – 166/7 (11–12 years) | St Anicetus; ANICETVS | Emesa, Syria, Roman Empire (Note: Now Homs, Syria) | | Hellenized Syrian; first Syrian pope. A peregrinus, free provincial subject of the Roman Empire who was not a Roman citizen. Tradition holds he was martyred; feast day 20 April. Decreed that priests are not allowed to have long hair. Also revered as a saint in Eastern Christianity, with a feast day of 17 April. |
| 12 | 166/7 – 174/5 (8–9 years) | St Soter; SOTER | Fundi, Italia, Roman Empire (Note: Now Fondi, Italy) | | Roman citizen, born in Italia, the homeland of the ancient Romans. Tradition holds he was martyred; feast day 22 April. Declared that marriage was valid as a sacrament blessed by a priest; formally inaugurated Easter as an annual festival in Rome. |
| 13 | 174/5 – 189 (14–15 years) | St Eleutherius; ELEVTHERIVS | Nicopolis, Epirus, Roman Empire (Note: Now a Roman ruin near Preveza, Greece) | | Greek. A peregrinus, free provincial subject of the Roman Empire who was not a Roman citizen. Tradition holds he was martyred; feast day 6 May. |
| 14 | 189 – 198/9 (9–10 years) | St Victor I VICTOR | Africa, Roman Empire (Note: It is not clear when Pope Victor I was born, and where he was born, although some suggest he was born in Leptis Magna, now a part of Libya.) | | Roman Berber; first pope to have been born on the continent of Africa. Uncertain if he was a peregrinus (a free subject of the Roman Empire) or a Roman citizen. Feast day 28 July or 11 January. Known for excommunicating Theodotus of Byzantium. Quartodecimanism controversy. |
| 15 | 198/9 – 20 December 217 (18–19 years) | St Zephyrinus; ZEPHYRINVS | Roma, Italia, Roman Empire | | Roman citizen, born in the capital of the Roman Empire. Although not physically martyred (murdered), he is called a martyr for the suffering he endured; feast day 20 December. Combated against the adoptionist heresies of the followers of Theodotus of Byzantium, who were ruled by Theodotus and Asclepiodotus. |
| — | c. 198/9 – c. 199/200 (1 year) | Natalius; NATALIVS | Roma, Italia, Roman Empire | | Roman citizen, born in the capital of the Roman Empire. In opposition to Zephyrinus. Later reconciled. |

==== 3rd century ====
Popes of the 3rd century
| Pontiff number | Pontificate | Name: English · Latin | Date and place of birth | Age at start/ end | Notes |
|---|---|---|---|---|---|
| 16 | 218 – 14 October 222 (4 years) | St Callixtus I CALLISTVS | Roma, Italia, Roman Empire | | Roman citizen of Greek descent (Constitutio Antoniniana). Martyred; feast day 14 October. |
| — | 217 – 235 (18 years) | St Hippolytus; HIPPOLYTVS | c. 170 | 47 / 65 | Roman citizen of Greek descent (Constitutio Antoniniana). In opposition to Callixtus I, Urban I, and Pontian. Later reconciled with Pontian (see below). |
| 17 | 222 – 19 May 230 (7 years) | St Urban I VRBANVS | Roma, Italia, Roman Empire | | Roman citizen. Feast day 25 May. Also revered as a saint in Eastern Christianity, with the same feast day. |
| 18 | 21 July 230 – 28 September 235 (5 years, 69 days) | St Pontian; PONTIANVS | Roma, Italia, Roman Empire | | Roman citizen. Feast day 13 August. First to abdicate due to his exile to Sardinia by Emperor Maximinus Thrax. The Liberian Catalogue recorded his exile on 28 September 235, the earliest exact date in papal history. Also revered as a saint in Eastern Christianity, with the same feast day. |
| 19 | 21 November 235 – 3 January 236 (43 days) | St Anterus; ANTERVS | Petelia, Italia, Roman Empire (Note: Now Petilia Policastro, Italy) | | Roman citizen of Greek descent (Constitutio Antoniniana). Feast day 3 January. Also revered as a saint in Eastern Christianity, with a feast day of 5 August. |
| 20 | 10 January 236 – 20 January 250 (14 years, 10 days) | St Fabian; FABIANVS | Roma, Italia, Roman Empire | | Roman citizen. Feast day 20 January. Divided the communities of Rome into seven districts, each supervised by a deacon. Also revered as a saint in Eastern Christianity, with a feast day of 5 August. |
| 21 | March 251 – June 253 (2 years, 3 months) | St Cornelius; CORNELIVS | Roma, Italia, Roman Empire | | Roman citizen. Died as a martyr through extreme hardship; feast day 16 September. |
| — | March 251 – 258 (7 years) | Novatian; NOVATIANVS | c. 200–220 Roma, Italia, Roman Empire | 31–51 / 38–58 | Roman citizen. Founder of Novatianism. In opposition to Cornelius, Lucius I, Stephen I, and Sixtus II. |
| 22 | 25 June 253 – 5 March 254 (253 days) | St Lucius I LUCIVS | Roma, Italia, Roman Empire | | Roman citizen. Feast day 5 March. |
| 23 | 12 March 254 – 2 August 257 (3 years, 143 days) | St Stephen I STEPHANVS | Roma, Italia, Roman Empire | | Roman citizen of Greek descent (Constitutio Antoniniana). Martyred by beheading; feast day 2 August. Also revered as a saint in Eastern Christianity, with the same feast day. |
| 24 | 31 August 257 – 6 August 258 (340 days) | St Sixtus II; XYSTVS Secundus | Athenae, Achaea, Roman Empire | | Roman citizen of Greek descent (Constitutio Antoniniana). Martyred by beheading; feast day 6 August. Also revered as a saint in Eastern Christianity, with the same feast day. |
| 25 | 22 July 259 – 27 December 268 (9 years, 158 days) | St Dionysius; DIONYSIVS | Terra Nova, Italia, Roman Empire | | Roman citizen of Greek descent (Constitutio Antoniniana). Feast day 26 December. |
| 26 | 5 January 269 – 30 December 274 (5 years, 359 days) | St Felix I FELIX | Roma, Italia, Roman Empire | | Roman citizen. Feast day 30 December. |
| 27 | 4 January 275 – 7 December 283 (8 years, 337 days) | St Eutychian; EVTYCHIANVS | Luna, Italia, Roman Empire (Note: Now Luni, Italy) | | Roman citizen. Feast day 8 December. |
| 28 | 17 December 283 – 22 April 296 (12 years, 127 days) | St Caius; CAIVS | Salona, Dalmatia, Roman Empire (Note: Now a Roman ruin near Solin, Croatia) | | Roman citizen. Martyred by beheading (according to legend); feast day 22 April. Also revered as a saint in Eastern Christianity, with a feast day of 11 August. |
| 29 | 30 June 296 – 25 October 304 (8 years, 117 days) | St Marcellinus; MARCELLINVS | Roma, Italia, Roman Empire | | Roman citizen. Feast day 26 April. Also revered as a saint in Eastern Christianity, with a feast day of 7 June. |

==== 4th century ====
Popes of the 4th century
| Pontiff number | Pontificate | Name: English · Latin | Date and place of birth | Age at start/ end | Notes |
|---|---|---|---|---|---|
| 30 | 27 May 308 – 16 January 309 (234 days) | St Marcellus I MARCELLVS | Rome, Italy, Roman Empire | | Roman citizen. Banished from Rome by Emperor Maxentius (309) and died in exile; feast day 16 January. |
| 31 | 18 April 309 – 17 August 310 (1 year, 121 days) | St Eusebius; EVSEBIVS | Achaea, Roman Empire | | Roman citizen of Greek descent. Banished by Emperor Maxentius and died in exile; feast day 17 August. |
| 32 | 2 July 311 – 10 January 314 (2 years, 192 days) | St Miltiades (Melchiades); MILTIADES | Africa, Roman Empire | | Roman citizen of Berber descent. Feast day 10 January. First pope after the end of the persecution of Christians through the Edict of Milan (313), issued by Emperor Constantine I. Presided over the Lateran Council of 313. |
| 33 | 31 January 314 – 31 December 335 (21 years, 334 days) | St Sylvester I SILVESTER | Fanum Sancti Angeli de Scala, Apulia et Calabria, Roman Empire | | Roman citizen. Feast day 31 December. Also revered as a saint in Eastern Christianity, with a feast day of 2 January. Pope during the First Council of Nicaea (325), the first ecumenical council. Under him were built: the Archbasilica of Saint John Lateran, the Santa Croce in Gerusalemme, and the Old St. Peter's Basilica. Stated to be the recipient of the Donation of Constantine, which was later shown to be a forgery. |
| 34 | 18 January 336 – 7 October 336 (263 days) | St Mark; MARCVS | Rome, Italy, Roman Empire | | Roman citizen. Feast day 7 October. Compiled stories of martyrs and bishops before his time. May have founded two churches in the area of Rome: Church of San Marco and a church at the Catacomb of Balbina, a cemetery. |
| 35 | 6 February 337 – 12 April 352 (15 years, 66 days) | St Julius I IVLIVS | Rome, Italy, Roman Empire | | Roman citizen. Feast day 12 April. He was involved in the Arian controversy, supporting Athanasius of Alexandria. |
| 36 | 17 May 352 – 24 September 366 (14 years, 130 days) | Liberius; LIBERIVS | Rome, Italy, Roman Empire | | Roman citizen. Banished by the Arian-leaning Emperor Constantius II and later yielding to him. Earliest pope not canonized by the Latin Church. Revered as a saint in Eastern Christianity, with a feast day of 27 August. |
| — | 355 – 22 November 365 (10 years, 0 days) | Felix II; FELIX Secundus | c. 300 Rome, Italy, Roman Empire | 55 / 65 | Roman citizen. In opposition to Liberius. Installed by Arian-leaning Emperor Constantius II. |
| 37 | 1 October 366 – 11 December 384 (18 years, 71 days) | St Damasus I DAMASVS | c. 305 Egitania, Lusitania or Rome, Italy, Roman Empire | 60 / 78 | Roman citizen. First pope from modern-day Portugal. Feast day 11 December. Patron of Jerome, commissioned the Vulgate translation of the Bible. Pope during the First Council of Constantinople (381), the second ecumenical council, and the Council of Rome (382). First pope to be the official head of the church after Emperor Gratian abdicated the title of Pontifex Maximus. |
| — | 1 October 366 – 16 November 367 (1 year, 46 days) | Ursinus; VRSINVS | Rome, Italy, Roman Empire | | Roman citizen. In opposition to Damasus I. Banished to Gallia by Emperor Valentinian II after a war between two sects and died after 384. |
| 38 | 17 December 384 – 26 November 399 (14 years, 344 days) | St Siricius; SIRICIVS | c. 334 Rome, Italy, Roman Empire | 50 / 65 | Roman citizen. Feast day 26 November. His famous letters—the earliest surviving texts of papal decretals—were focused particularly on religious discipline and include decisions on baptism, consecration, ordination, penance, and continence. Siricius's important decretal of 386 (written to Bishop Himerius of Tarragona), commanding celibacy for priests, was the first decree on this subject. |
| 39 | 27 November 399 – 19 December 401 (2 years, 22 days) | St Anastasius I ANASTASIVS | Rome, Italy, Roman Empire | | Roman citizen. Feast day 19 December. Instructed priests to stand and bow their heads as they read from the Gospels. |

==== 5th century ====
Popes of the 5th century
| Pontiff number | Pontificate | Name: English · Latin | Date and place of birth | Age at start/ end | Notes |
|---|---|---|---|---|---|
| 40 | 21 December 401 – 12 March 417 (15 years, 81 days) | St Innocent I INNOCENTIVS | Albanum, Latium et Campania, Roman Empire | | Roman citizen. Feast day 12 March. Rome was sacked by the Visigoths under King Alaric I (410). |
| 41 | 18 March 417 – 26 December 418 (1 year, 283 days) | St Zosimus; ZOSIMVS | Messurga, Lucania et Bruttii, Roman Empire | | Roman citizen of Greek descent. Feast day 27 December. |
| — | 27 December 418 – 3 April 419 (97 days) | Eulalius; EVLALIVS | Rome, Italy, Roman Empire | | Roman citizen. In opposition to Boniface I. Elected on the eve of the election of Boniface, first benefited from the support of Emperor Honorius but lost it quickly. Exiled to Campania and died in 423. |
| 42 | 28 December 418 – 4 September 422 (3 years, 250 days) | St Boniface I BONIFACIVS | Rome, Italy, Roman Empire | | Roman citizen. Feast day 25 October. |
| 43 | 10 September 422 – 27 July 432 (9 years, 321 days) | St Celestine I COELESTINVS | Campania, Roman Empire | | Roman citizen. Feast day 27 July. Also revered as a saint in Eastern Christianity, with a feast day of 8 April. Pope during the Council of Ephesus (431), the third ecumenical council recognized by the Catholic, Eastern Orthodox, and Oriental Orthodox churches. |
| 44 | 31 July 432 – 18 August 440 (8 years, 18 days) | St Sixtus III; XYSTVS Tertius | Rome, Italy, Roman Empire | | Roman citizen. Feast day 28 March. |
| 45 | 29 September 440 – 10 November 461 (21 years, 42 days) | St Leo I "the Great"; LEO MAGNVS | Etruria, Italy, Roman Empire | | Roman citizen. Feast day 10 November. Convinced Attila the Hun to turn back his invasion of Italy. Convinced the Vandals to spare the lives of the citizenry of Rome during their sack of the city. Wrote the Tome, which was instrumental in the Council of Chalcedon (451) and in defining the hypostatic union. Also revered as a saint in Eastern Christianity, with a feast day of 18 February. |
| 46 | 19 November 461 – 29 February 468 (6 years, 102 days) | St Hilarius; HILARIVS | Sardinia, Italy, Western Roman Empire | | Roman citizen. Feast day 28 February. |
| 47 | 3 March 468 – 10 March 483 (15 years, 7 days) | St Simplicius; SIMPLICIVS | Tibur, Italy, Western Roman Empire, Kingdom of Odoacer | | Roman citizen, later a subject of the Kingdom of Italy. Feast day 10 March. Pope during the collapse of the Western Roman Empire in 476 and subsequent overtaking of Rome and Italy in general by King Odoacer. |
| 48 | 13 March 483 – 1 March 492 (8 years, 354 days) | St Felix III; FELIX Tertius | Rome, Italy, Kingdom of Odoacer | | Roman citizen, later a subject of the Kingdom of Italy. Feast day 1 March. Sometimes called Felix II. Great-great-grandfather of Gregory I. |
| 49 | 1 March 492 – 21 November 496 (4 years, 265 days) | St Gelasius I GELASIVS | Mons Ferratus, Africa, Kingdom of Odoacer, Ostrogothic Kingdom of Italy | | Roman citizen of Berber descent, later a subject of the (Ostrogothic) Kingdom of Italy; last pope to have been born on the continent of Africa. Feast day 21 November. First pope called the Vicarius Christi (Vicar of Christ). |
| 50 | 24 November 496 – 19 November 498 (1 year, 360 days) | Anastasius II; ANASTASIVS Secundus | Rome, Italy, Ostrogothic Kingdom of Italy | | Roman citizen of Greek descent, later a subject of the (Ostrogothic) Kingdom of Italy. Tried to end the Acacian schism, but it resulted in the Laurentian schism. Earliest pope not canonized by either the Latin Church or the Eastern Church. |
| 51 | 22 November 498 – 19 July 514 (15 years, 239 days) | St Symmachus; SYMMACHVS | Sardinia, Italy, Ostrogothic Kingdom of Italy | | Roman citizen, later a subject of the (Ostrogothic) Kingdom of Italy. Feast day 19 July. |
| — | 22 November 498 – Aug 506/8 (7 years, 252 days) | Laurentius; LAVRENTIVS | Rome, Italy, Ostrogothic Kingdom of Italy | | Roman citizen, later a subject of the (Ostrogothic) Kingdom of Italy. In opposition to Symmachus. Elected on the same day as Symachus, King Theodoric settled in favour of his adversary. Took control of Rome in 501 and remained pope in fact until he died in 506/08. |

==== 6th century ====
Popes of the 6th century
| Pontiff number | Pontificate | Portrait | Name: English · Latin | Personal name | Date and place of birth | Age at start/ end of papacy | Notes |
|---|---|---|---|---|---|---|---|
| 52 | 20 July 514 – 6 August 523 (9 years, 17 days) | | St Hormisdas; HORMISDAS | Hormisdas | c. 450 Frusino, Italy, Ostrogothic Kingdom of Italy | 64 / 73 | Roman citizen, later a subject of the (Ostrogothic) Kingdom of Italy. Feast day 6 August. Father of Silverius. Acacian schism. |
| 53 | 13 August 523 – 18 May 526 (2 years, 278 days) | | St John I IOANNES | Ioannes | Sena Iulia, Italy, Ostrogothic Kingdom of Italy | | Roman citizen, later a subject of the (Ostrogothic) Kingdom of Italy. Feast day 18 May. Theoderic had John arrested on the suspicion of having conspired with Emperor Justin. John was imprisoned at Ravenna, where he died of neglect and ill treatment. |
| 54 | 12 July 526 – 22 September 530 (4 years, 72 days) | | St Felix IV; FELIX Quartus | Felix | c. 490 Samnium, Ostrogothic Kingdom of Italy | 36 / 40 | Subject of the (Ostrogothic) Kingdom of Italy of Roman descent. Feast day 30 January. Sometimes called Felix III. Built Santi Cosma e Damiano. |
| 55 | 22 September 530 – 17 October 532 (2 years, 25 days) | | Boniface II; BONIFACIVS Secundus | Bonifacius | Ostrogothic Kingdom of Italy | | Ostrogoth; first Germanic pope. Subject of the (Ostrogothic) Kingdom of Italy. Changed the method of numbering the years in the Julian calendar from Anno Martyrum to Anno Domini. |
| — | 22 September 530 – 14 October 530 (22 days) | | Dioscorus; DIOSCORVS | Dioscorus | Alexandria, Aegyptus, Eastern Roman Empire | | (Eastern) Roman citizen of Greek descent. In opposition to Boniface II. Candidate of the Byzantine party, elected by the majority of the cardinals and recognized by Constantinople, died less than a month after his election. |
| 56 | 2 January 533 – 8 May 535 (2 years, 126 days) | | John II; IOANNES Secundus | Mercurius | c. 475 Rome, Western Roman Empire | 58 / 60 | Roman citizen, later a subject of the (Ostrogothic) Kingdom of Italy. First pope not to use his personal name (Mercurius), as it was associated with the Roman god Mercury. |
| 57 | 13 May 535 – 22 April 536 (356 days) | | St Agapetus I AGAPITVS | Agapetus | c. 490 Rome, Ostrogothic Kingdom of Italy | 45 / 46 | Subject of the (Ostrogothic) Kingdom of Italy of Roman descent. Feast days 22 April and 20 September. Also revered as a saint in Eastern Christianity, with a feast day of 17 April. |
| 58 | 8 June 536 – 11 March 537 (276 days) | | St Silverius; SILVERIVS | Silverius | Cicanum,Ostrogothic Kingdom of Italy]] | | Subject of the (Ostrogothic) Kingdom of Italy of Roman descent. Exiled; feast day 20 June. Son of Hormisdas. |
| 59 | 29 March 537 – 7 June 555 (18 years, 70 days) | | Vigilius; VIGILIVS | Vigilius | c. 497 Rome, Ostrogothic Kingdom of Italy | 40 / 58 | Subject of the (Ostrogothic) Kingdom of Italy, later a (Eastern) Roman citizen. Was of Roman ethnicity. Pope during the Second Council of Constantinople (553), the fifth ecumenical council recognized by the Catholic and Eastern Orthodox churches. |
| 60 | 16 April 556 – 4 March 561 (4 years, 322 days) | | Pelagius I PELAGIVS | Pelagius | c. 500 Rome, Ostrogothic Kingdom of Italy | 56 / 61 | Subject of the (Ostrogothic) Kingdom of Italy, later a (Eastern) Roman citizen. Was of Roman ethnicity. Credited with the construction of the basilica of Santi Apostoli. |
| 61 | 17 July 561 – 13 July 574 (12 years, 361 days) | | John III; IOANNES Tertius | Catelinus | Rome, Ostrogothic Kingdom of Italy | | Subject of the (Ostrogothic) Kingdom of Italy, later a (Eastern) Roman citizen. Was of Roman ethnicity. Second pope not to use his personal name (Catelinus). |
| 62 | 2 June 575 – 30 July 579 (4 years, 58 days) | | Benedict I BENEDICTVS | Benedictus | Rome, Ostrogothic Kingdom of Italy | | Subject of the (Ostrogothic) Kingdom of Italy, later a (Eastern) Roman citizen. Was of Roman ethnicity. |
| 63 | 26 November 579 – 7 February 590 (10 years, 73 days) | | Pelagius II; PELAGIVS Secundus | Pelagius | Rome, Ostrogothic Kingdom of Italy | | Romanized Ostrogoth. Subject of the (Ostrogothic) Kingdom of Italy, later a (Eastern) Roman citizen. Ordered the construction of the Basilica di San Lorenzo fuori le Mura. |
| 64 | 3 September 590 – 12 March 604 (13 years, 191 days) | | St Gregory I "the Great"; GREGORIVS MAGNVS | Gregorius | c. 540 Rome, Eastern Roman Empire | 50 / 64 | Subject of the (Ostrogothic) Kingdom of Italy, later a (Eastern) Roman citizen. Was of Roman ethnicity. Feast day 3 September. Great-great-grandson of Felix III. First pope to employ the titles Pontifex Maximus and Servus servorum Dei formally. Established the Gregorian chant. Also revered as a saint in Eastern Christianity, with a feast day of 12 March. Known as "the Father of Christian Worship". Known as "St. Gregory the Dialogist" in Eastern Orthodoxy. |

==== 7th century ====
Popes of the 7th century
| Pontiff number | Pontificate | Portrait | Name: English · Latin | Personal name | Date and place of birth | Age at start/ end of papacy | Notes |
|---|---|---|---|---|---|---|---|
| 65 | 13 September 604 – 22 February 606 (1 year, 162 days) | | Sabinian; SABINIANVS | Sabinianus | c. 530 Blera, Eastern Roman Empire | 74 / 76 | Subject of the (Ostrogothic) Kingdom of Italy, later a (Eastern) Roman citizen. Was of Roman ethnicity. For the next two centuries, the Roman popes were all controlled by the (Eastern) Roman Empire. |
| 66 | 19 February 607 – 12 November 607 (266 days) | | Boniface III; BONIFACIVS Tertius | Bonifacius | Rome, Eastern Roman Empire | | Subject of the (Ostrogothic) Kingdom of Italy, later a (Eastern) Roman citizen. Was of Greek descent. |
| 67 | 15 September 608 – 8 May 615 (6 years, 235 days) | | St Boniface IV; BONIFACIVS Quartus | Bonifacius, O.S.B. | c. 550 Marsica, Eastern Roman Empire | 58 / 65 | Subject of the (Ostrogothic) Kingdom of Italy, later a (Eastern) Roman citizen. Was of Roman ethnicity. Feast day 8 May. Member of the Order of Saint Benedict. First pope to bear the same name as his immediate predecessor. |
| 68 | 13 November 615 – 8 November 618 (2 years, 360 days) | | St Adeodatus I ADEODATVS | Adeodatus (or Deusdedit) | Rome, Eastern Roman Empire | | (Eastern) Roman citizen. Was of Roman ethnicity. Feast day 8 November. Sometimes called Deusdedit. First pope to use lead seals on papal documents, which in time came to be called papal bulls. |
| 69 | 23 December 619 – 25 October 625 (5 years, 306 days) | | Boniface V BONIFACIVS Quintus | Bonifacius | Neapolis, Eastern Roman Empire | | (Eastern) Roman citizen. Was of Roman ethnicity. |
| 70 | 27 October 625 – 12 October 638 (12 years, 350 days) | | Honorius I HONORIVS | Honorius | Ceperanum, Campania, Eastern Roman Empire | | (Eastern) Roman citizen. Was of Roman ethnicity. Named a heretic and anathematized by the Third Council of Constantinople (680). |
| 71 | 28 May 640 – 2 August 640 (66 days) | | Severinus; SEVERINVS | Severinus | c. 585 Rome, Eastern Roman Empire | 55 / 55 | (Eastern) Roman citizen. Was of Roman ethnicity. |
| 72 | 24 December 640 – 12 October 642 (1 year, 292 days) | | John IV; IOANNES Quartus | Ioannes | c. 585 Iadera, Dalmatia, Eastern Roman Empire | 53 / 55 | (Eastern) Roman citizen. Was of Roman ethnicity. |
| 73 | 24 November 642 – 14 May 649 (6 years, 171 days) | | Theodore I THEODORVS | Theodorus | Hierosolyma, Eastern Roman Empire | | (Eastern) Roman citizen. Was of Greek ethnicity. Last pope from Palestine. Planned the Lateran Council of 649 but died before it could open. |
| 74 | 5 July 649 – 10 August 654 (5 years, 36 days) | | St Martin I MARTINVS | Martinus | c. 598 Near Tuder, Umbria, Eastern Roman Empire | 51 / 57 | (Eastern) Roman citizen. Was of Roman ethnicity. Last pope recognized as a martyr; feast day 12 November. Also revered as a saint in Eastern Christianity, with a feast day of 14 April. |
| 75 | 10 August 654 – 2 June 657 (2 years, 296 days) | | St Eugene I EVGENIVS | Eugenius | c. 615 Rome, Exarchate of Ravenna, Eastern Roman Empire | 39 / 42 | (Eastern) Roman citizen. Was of Roman ethnicity. Feast day 2 June. |
| 76 | 30 July 657 – 27 January 672 (14 years, 181 days) | | St Vitalian; VITALIANVS | Vitalianus | c. 600 Signia, Exarchate of Ravenna, Eastern Roman Empire | 56 / 71 | (Eastern) Roman citizen. Was of Roman ethnicity. Feast day 27 January. |
| 77 | 11 April 672 – 17 June 676 (4 years, 67 days) | | Adeodatus II; ADEODATVS Secundus | Adeodatus, O.S.B. | c. 621 Rome, Exarchate of Ravenna, Eastern Roman Empire | 51 / 55 | (Eastern) Roman citizen. Was of Roman ethnicity. Member of the Order of Saint Benedict. Sometimes called Adeodatus, without a number, in reference to Adeodatus I sometimes being called Deusdedit. |
| 78 | 2 November 676 – 11 April 678 (1 year, 160 days) | | Donus; DONVS | Donus | Rome, Exarchate of Ravenna, Eastern Roman Empire | | (Eastern) Roman citizen. Was of Roman ethnicity. |
| 79 | 27 June 678 – 10 January 681 (2 years, 197 days) | | St Agatho; AGATHO | Agatho | c. 577 Panormus, Sicily, Eastern Roman Empire | 101 / 104 | (Eastern) Roman citizen. Was of Greek ethnicity. Feast day 10 January. Also revered as a saint in Eastern Christianity, with a feast day of 20 February. Pope during the Third Council of Constantinople (680), the sixth ecumenical council accepted by the Catholic and Eastern Orthodox churches. |
| 80 | 17 August 682 – 3 July 683 (320 days) | | St Leo II; LEO Secundus | Leo | c. 611 Aydonum, Sicily, Eastern Roman Empire | 71 / 72 | (Eastern) Roman citizen. Was of Greek ethnicity. Feast day 3 July. |
| 81 | 26 June 684 – 8 May 685 (316 days) | | St Benedict II; BENEDICTVS Secundus | Benedictus | c. 635 Rome, Exarchate of Ravenna, Eastern Roman Empire | 49 / 50 | (Eastern) Roman citizen. Was of Roman ethnicity. Feast day 7 May. |
| 82 | 23 July 685 – 2 August 686 (1 year, 10 days) | | John V IOANNES Quintus | Ioannes | c. 635 Antiochia, Syria, Eastern Roman Empire | 50 / 51 | (Eastern) Roman citizen. Was of Greek ethnicity. |
| 83 | 21 October 686 – 21 September 687 (335 days) | | Conon; CONON | Conon | c. 630 Thracia, Eastern Roman Empire | 56 / 57 | (Eastern) Roman citizen. Was of Greek ethnicity. |
| 84 | 15 December 687 – 8 September 701 (13 years, 267 days) | | St Sergius I SERGIVS | Sergius | c. 650 Palermo, Sicily, Eastern Roman Empire | 37 / 51 | (Eastern) Roman citizen. Was a Hellenized Syrian. Introduced the singing of the Lamb of God at Mass. |

==== 8th century ====
Popes of the 8th century
| Pontiff number | Pontificate | Portrait | Name: English · Latin | Personal name | Date and place of birth | Age at start/ end of papacy | Notes |
|---|---|---|---|---|---|---|---|
| 85 | 30 October 701 – 11 January 705 (3 years, 73 days) | | John VI; IOANNES Sextus | Ioannes | c. 655 Ephesus, Eastern Roman Empire | 46 / 50 | (Eastern) Roman citizen. Was of Greek ethnicity. The only pope who came from Asia Minor. |
| 86 | 1 March 705 – 18 October 707 (2 years, 231 days) | | John VII; IOANNES Septimus | Ioannes | c. 650 Rossanum, Calabria, Eastern Roman Empire | 55 / 57 | (Eastern) Roman citizen. Was of Greek ethnicity. Second pope to bear the same name as his immediate predecessor. |
| 87 | 15 January 708 – 4 February 708 (20 days) | | Sisinnius; SISINNIVS | Sisinnius | Syria, Rashidun Caliphate | | Subject of the Rashidun Caliphate. Was of Syrian ethnicity. First pope to come from a Muslim country. |
| 88 | 25 March 708 – 9 April 715 (7 years, 15 days) | | Constantine; CONSTANTINVS | Constantinus | c. 664 Tyre, Jund al-Urdunn, Syria, Umayyad Caliphate | 44 / 51 | Subject of the Umayyad Caliphate. Was of Syrian ethnicity. Second pope to come from a Muslim country. Last pope to visit Greece while in office until John Paul II in 2001. |
| 89 | 19 May 715 – 11 February 731 (15 years, 268 days) | | St Gregory II; GREGORIVS Secundus | Gregorius | c. 669 Rome, Exarchate of Ravenna, Eastern Roman Empire | 46 / 62 | (Eastern) Roman citizen. Was of Roman ethnicity. Feast day 11 February. Held the Synod of Rome (721). |
| 90 | 18 March 731 – 28 November 741 (10 years, 255 days) | 178-7866 IMG – Gregorius III AV | St Gregory III; GREGORIVS Tertius | Gregorius | Syria, Umayyad Caliphate | | Subject of the Umayyad Caliphate; last pope from Syria. Third (and last) pope to come from a Muslim country. Last pope to have been born outside Europe until the election of Francis in 2013. Third pope to bear the same name as his immediate predecessor. |
| 91 | 3 December 741 – 15 March 752 (10 years, 103 days) | | St Zachary; ZACHARIAS | Zacharias | c. 679 Sancta Severina, Calabria, Eastern Roman Empire | 62 / 73 | (Eastern) Roman citizen. Was of Greek ethnicity. Feast day 15 March. Built the church of Santa Maria sopra Minerva. |
| — | 23 March 752 – 26 March 752 (3 days) (Never took office as pope) | | Stephen (II); STEPHANVS (Secundus) | Stephanus | Rome, Exarchate of Ravenna, Eastern Roman Empire | | (Eastern) Roman citizen. Was of Roman ethnicity. Previously known as Stephen II. Died three days after his election, having never received episcopal consecration. Some lists still include him. The Vatican sanctioned his addition in the 16th century; removed in 1961. He is no longer considered a pope by the Catholic Church. |
| 92 | 26 March 752 – 26 April 757 (5 years, 31 days) | | Stephen II; STEPHANVS Secundus | Stephanus | c. 714 Rome, Exarchate of Ravenna, Eastern Roman Empire | 38 / 43 | (Eastern) Roman citizen, later the sovereign of the independent Papal States. Was of Roman ethnicity. Sometimes called Stephen III. The Donation of Pepin. Brother of Paul I. |
| 93 | 29 May 757 – 28 June 767 (10 years, 30 days) | | St Paul I PAVLVS | Paulus | c. 700 Rome, Exarchate of Ravenna, Eastern Roman Empire | 57 / 67 | (Eastern) Roman citizen, later the sovereign of the independent Papal States. Was of Roman ethnicity. Brother of Stephen II. |
| 94 | 7 August 768 – 24 January 772 (3 years, 170 days) | | Stephen III; STEPHANVS Tertius | Stephanus | c. 720 Syracuse, Sicily, Eastern Roman Empire | 48 / 52 | (Eastern) Roman citizen, later the sovereign of the independent Papal States. Was of Greek ethnicity. Sometimes called Stephen IV. He summoned the Lateran Council of 769. |
| 95 | 1 February 772 – 26 December 795 (23 years, 328 days) | | Adrian I HADRIANVS | Hadrianus | c. 700 Rome, Exarchate of Ravenna, Eastern Roman Empire | 72 / 95 | (Eastern) Roman citizen, later the sovereign of the independent Papal States. Was of Roman ethnicity. Pope during the Second Council of Nicaea (787), the seventh ecumenical council accepted by the Catholic and Eastern Orthodox churches. |
| 96 | 26 December 795 – 12 June 816 (20 years, 169 days) | | St Leo III; LEO Tertius | Leo | Rome, Exarchate of Ravenna, Eastern Roman Empire | | (Eastern) Roman citizen, later the sovereign of the independent Papal States. Was of Roman ethnicity. Crowned Emperor Charlemagne on Christmas Day in 800, thereby initiating what would become the Holy Roman Empire, requiring the imprimatur of the pope for its rulers' legitimacy. |

==== 9th century ====
Popes of the 9th century
| Pontiff number | Pontificate | Portrait | Name: English · Latin | Personal name | Date and place of birth | Age at start/ end of papacy | Notes |
|---|---|---|---|---|---|---|---|
| 97 | 22 June 816 – 24 January 817 (216 days) | | Stephen IV; STEPHANVS Quartus | Stephanus | Rome, Papal States | | First pope born in Rome after breaking away from the (Eastern) Roman Empire. Sometimes called Stephen V. |
| 98 | 25 January 817 – 11 February 824 (7 years, 17 days) | | St Paschal I PASCHALIS | Paschalis | Rome, Papal States | | Subject and later the sovereign of the Papal States. Son of Bonosus and Theodora. Credited with finding the body of Saint Cecilia in the Catacomb of Callixtus and building the basilica of Santa Cecilia in Trastevere and the church of Santa Maria in Domnica. |
| 99 | 6 June 824 – 27 August 827 (3 years, 111 days) | | Eugene II; EVGENIVS Secundus | Eugenius | Rome, Papal States | | Subject and later the sovereign of the Papal States. |
| 100 | 31 August 827 – 10 October 827 (40 days) | | Valentine; VALENTINVS | Valentinus | Rome, Papal States | | Subject and later the sovereign of the Papal States. |
| 101 | 20 December 827 – 25 January 844 (16 years, 36 days) | | Gregory IV; GREGORIVS Quartus | Gregorius | Rome, Papal States | | Subject and later the sovereign of the Papal States. Rebuilt the atrium of St. Peter's Basilica and in the newly decorated chapel. Transferred the body of Gregory I. |
| 102 | 25 January 844 – 27 January 847 (3 years, 2 days) | | Sergius II; SERGIVS Secundus | Sergius | Rome, Papal States | | Subject and later the sovereign of the Papal States. |
| 103 | 10 April 847 – 17 July 855 (8 years, 98 days) | | St Leo IV; LEO Quartus | Leo, O.S.B. | Rome, Papal States | | Subject and later the sovereign of the Papal States. Was of Lombard ethnicity. Member of the Order of Saint Benedict. |
| 104 | 29 September 855 – 17 April 858 (2 years, 200 days) | | Benedict III; BENEDICTVS Tertius | Benedictus | Rome, Papal States | | Subject and later the sovereign of the Papal States. |
| 105 | 24 April 858 – 13 November 867 (9 years, 203 days) | | St Nicholas I "the Great"; NICOLAVS MAGNVS | Nicolaus | c. 800 Rome, Papal States | 58 / 67 | Subject and later the sovereign of the Papal States. Feast day 13 November. Encouraged missionary activity. |
| 106 | 14 December 867 – 14 December 872 (5 years, 0 days) | | Adrian II; HADRIANVS Secundus | Hadrianus | c. 792 Rome, Papal States | 75 / 80 | Subject and later the sovereign of the Papal States. Pope during the Fourth Council of Constantinople (869–870), the eighth ecumenical council of the Catholic Church. |
| 107 | 14 December 872 – 16 December 882 (10 years, 2 days) | | John VIII; IOANNES Octavus | Ioannes | Rome, Papal States | | Subject and later the sovereign of the Papal States. First pope to be assassinated. |
| 108 | 16 December 882 – 15 May 884 (1 year, 151 days) | | Marinus I MARINVS | Marinus | c. 830 Gallese, Papal States | 52 / 54 | Subject and later the sovereign of the Papal States. Erroneously also known as Martin II. |
| 109 | 17 May 884 – 8 July 885 (1 year, 121 days) | | St Adrian III; HADRIANVS Tertius | Hadrianus | Rome, Papal States | | Subject and later the sovereign of the Papal States. Feast day 8 July. Adrian I was possibly his ancestor. |
| 110 | September 885 – 14 September 891 (5 years, 355 days) | | Stephen V STEPHANVS Quintus | Stephanus | Rome, Papal States | | Subject and later the sovereign of the Papal States. Sometimes called Stephen VI. |
| 111 | 6 October 891 – 4 April 896 (4 years, 181 days) | | Formosus; FORMOSVS | Formosus | c. 816 Ostia, Papal States | 75 / 80 | Subject and later the sovereign of the Papal States. Posthumously tried and executed by Stephen VI in January 897 at the Cadaver Synod. His body was reburied with full Christian honours in the late 897. |
| 112 | 11 April 896 – 26 April 896 (15 days) | | Boniface VI; BONIFATIVS Sextus | Bonifatius | Rome, Papal States | | Subject and later the sovereign of the Papal States. |
| 113 | 22 May 896 – 14 August 897 (1 year, 84 days) | | Stephen VI; STEPHANVS | Stephanus | Rome, Papal States | | Subject and later the sovereign of the Papal States. Sometimes called Stephen VII. Held the infamous Cadaver Synod. |
| 114 | 14 August 897 – November 897 (92 days) | | Romanus; ROMANVS | Romanus | Gallese, Papal States | | Subject and later the sovereign of the Papal States. |
| 115 | December 897 – 20 December 897 (19 days) | | Theodore II; THEODORVS Secundus | Theodorus | c. 840 Rome, Papal States | 57 / 57 | Subject and later the sovereign of the Papal States. Was of Greek ethnicity. |
| 116 | 18 January 898 – 5 January 900 (1 year, 352 days) | | John IX; IOANNES Nonus | Ioannes, O.S.B. | c. 825 Tivoli, Papal States | 73 / 75 | Subject and later the sovereign of the Papal States. Was of Lombard ethnicity. Member of the Order of Saint Benedict. |
| 117 | 1 February 900 – 30 July 903 (3 years, 179 days) | | Benedict IV; BENEDICTVS Quartus | Benedictus | c. 840 Rome, Papal States | 60 / 63 | Subject and later the sovereign of the Papal States. |

==== 10th century ====
Popes of the 10th century
| Pontiff number | Pontificate | Portrait | Name: English · Latin | Personal name | Date and place of birth | Age at start/ end of papacy | Notes |
|---|---|---|---|---|---|---|---|
| 118 | 30 July 903 – December 903 (124 days) | | Leo V LEO Quintus | Leo | Ardea, Papal States | | Subject and later the sovereign of the Papal States. Deposed and murdered. |
| — | October 903 – January 904 (92 days) | | Christopher; CHRISTOFORVS | Christoforus | Rome, Papal States | | Subject and later the claimant of the throne of the Papal States. In opposition to Leo V. |
| 119 | 29 January 904 – 14 April 911 (7 years, 75 days) | | Sergius III; SERGIVS Tertius | Sergius | c. 860 Rome, Papal States | 44 / 51 | Subject and later the sovereign of the Papal States. Saeculum obscurum began. First pope to be depicted with the papal tiara. |
| 120 | 14 April 911 – June 913 (2 years, 48 days) | | Anastasius III; ANASTASIVS Tertius | Anastasius | c. 865 Rome, Papal States | 46 / 48 | Subject and later the sovereign of the Papal States. |
| 121 | 7 July 913 – 5 February 914 (213 days) | | Lando; LANDVS | Lando | Sabina, Papal States | | Subject and later the sovereign of the Papal States. Last to use a new and non-composed regnal name until Francis (2013–2025). |
| 122 | March 914 – 28 May 928 (14 years, 88 days) | | John X IOANNES Decimus | Ioannes | Tossignano, Papal States | | Subject and later the sovereign of the Papal States. |
| 123 | 28 May 928 – February 929 (249 days) | | Leo VI; LEO Sextus | Leo | c. 880 Rome, Papal States | 48 / 48 | Subject and later the sovereign of the Papal States. |
| 124 | 3 February 929 – 13 February 931 (2 years, 10 days) | | Stephen VII; STEPHANVS Septimus | Stephanus de Gabrielli | Rome, Papal States | | Subject and later the sovereign of the Papal States. Sometimes called Stephen VIII. |
| 125 | 15 March 931 – December 935 (4 years, 261 days) | | John XI; IOANNES Undecimus | Ioannes | c. 910 Rome, Papal States | 21 / 25 | Subject and later the sovereign of the Papal States. Probably, according to the Liber Pontificalis and Liutprand of Cremona, the son of Sergius III, who was Marozia's husband, and not of Alberic I of Spoleto. |
| 126 | 3 January 936 – 13 July 939 (3 years, 191 days) | | Leo VII; LEO Septimus | Leo, O.S.B. | Rome, Papal States | | Subject and later the sovereign of the Papal States. Member of the Order of Saint Benedict. |
| 127 | 14 July 939 – 30 October 942 (3 years, 108 days) | | Stephen VIII; STEPHANVS Octavus | Stephanus | Rome, Papal States | | Subject and later the sovereign of the Papal States. Sometimes called Stephen IX. |
| 128 | 30 October 942 – 1 May 946 (3 years, 183 days) | | Marinus II; MARINVS Secundus | Marinus | Rome, Papal States | | Subject and later the sovereign of the Papal States. Erroneously also known as Martin III. |
| 129 | 10 May 946 – 8 November 955 (9 years, 182 days) | | Agapetus II; AGAPITVS Secundus | Agapetus | c. 911 Rome, Papal States | 35 / 44 | Subject and later the sovereign of the Papal States. |
| 130 | 16 December 955 – 6 December 963 (7 years, 355 days) | | John XII; IOANNES Duodecimus | Ottaviano | c. 930–37 Rome, Papal States | 18–25 / 26–33 (†27–34) | Subject and later the sovereign of the Papal States. Third pope not to use his personal name (Ottaviano). Crowned Emperor Otto I in 962. Deposed in 963 by Emperor Otto I invalidly. |
| — | 6 December 963 – 26 February 964 (82 days) | | Leo VIII; LEO Octavus | Leo | c. 915 Rome, Papal States | 48 / 49 (†50) | Subject and later the claimant of the throne of the Papal States. Appointed antipope by Emperor Otto I in 963 in opposition to John XII and Benedict V. His pontificate from 963 to 964 is considered illegitimate by today's Catholic Church. |
| 130 | 26 February 964 – 14 May 964 (78 days) | | John XII; IOANNES Duodecimus | Ottaviano | c. 930–37 Rome, Papal States | 27–34 / 27–34 | Subject and later the sovereign of the Papal States. Possibly murdered in 964. End of the Saeculum obscurum. |
| 131 | 22 May 964 – 23 June 964 (32 days) | | Benedict V BENEDICTVS Quintus | Benedetto | Rome, Papal States | | Subject and later the sovereign of the Papal States. Elected by the people of Rome in opposition to Leo VIII, who was appointed by Emperor Otto I. Accepted his deposition in favour of Leo VIII in 964. |
| 132 | 23 June 964 – 1 March 965 (251 days) | | Leo VIII; LEO Octavus | Leo | c. 915 Rome, Papal States | 49 / 50 | Subject and later the sovereign of the Papal States. His pontificate after the deposition of Benedict V is considered legitimate by today's Catholic Church. |
| 133 | 1 October 965 – 6 September 972 (6 years, 341 days) | | John XIII; IOANNES Tertius Decimus | Giovanni | Rome, Papal States | | Subject and later the sovereign of the Papal States. Chronicled after his death as "the Good". |
| 134 | 19 January 973 – 8 June 974 (1 year, 140 days) | | Benedict VI; BENEDICTVS Sextus | Benedetto | Rome, Papal States | | Subject and later the sovereign of the Papal States. Was of Lombard ethnicity. Deposed and murdered. |
| — | July 974 – July 974 (30 days) | | Boniface VII; BONIFATIVS Septimus | Francone Ferucci | Rome, Papal States | | Subject and later the claimant of the throne of the Papal States, born Francone Ferucci. In opposition to Benedict VI and Benedict VII. |
| 135 | October 974 – 10 July 983 (8 years, 282 days) | | Benedict VII; BENEDICTVS Septimus | Benedetto | Rome, Papal States | | Subject and later the sovereign of the Papal States. |
| 136 | December 983 – 20 August 984 (263 days) | | John XIV; IOANNES Quartus Decimus | Pietro Canepanova | Pavia, Kingdom of Italy | | Subject of the Kingdom of Italy. Fourth pope not to use his personal name (Pietro Canepanova). |
| — | 20 August 984 – 20 July 985 (334 days) | | Boniface VII; BONIFATIVS Septimus | Francone Ferucci | Rome, Papal States | | Subject and later the claimant of the throne of the Papal States. In opposition to John XIV and John XV. |
| 137 | 20 August 985 – 1 April 996 (10 years, 225 days) | | John XV; IOANNES Quintus Decimus | Giovanni di Gallina Alba | Rome, Papal States | | Subject and later the sovereign of the Papal States. First pope to formally canonize a saint. |
| 138 | 3 May 996 – 18 February 999 (2 years, 291 days) | | Gregory V GREGORIVS Quintus | Bruno von Kärnten | c. 972 Stainach, Duchy of Carinthia | 24 / 27 | Subject of the Duchy of Carinthia. First official German pope. Fifth pope not to use his personal name (Bruno). Henceforth, this decision became tradition among the future popes. |
| — | April 997 – February 998 (306 days) | | John XVI; IOANNES Sextus Decimus | Iōánnēs Philágathos, O.S.B. | c. 945 Rossanum, Calabria, Italy, Eastern Roman Empire | 52 / 53 (†56) | (Eastern) Roman citizen. In opposition to Gregory V. |
| 139 | 2 April 999 – 12 May 1003 (4 years, 40 days) | | Sylvester II; SILVESTER Secundus | Gerbert d'Aurillac, O.S.B. | c. 945 Belliac, Kingdom of the West Franks | 53 / 57 | Subject of the Kingdom of the West Franks (later renamed Kingdom of France). First French (Occitan) pope. Member of the Order of Saint Benedict. |

=== 2nd millennium ===
==== 11th century ====
Popes of the 11th century
| Pontiff number | Pontificate | Portrait | Name: English · Latin | Personal name | Date and place of birth | Age at start/ end of papacy | Notes |
|---|---|---|---|---|---|---|---|
| 140 | 16 May 1003 – 6 November 1003 (174 days) | | John XVII; IOANNES Septimus Decimus | Giovanni Sicco | c. 955 Rome, Papal States | 48 / 48 | Subject and later the sovereign of the Papal States. |
| 141 | 25 December 1003 – 18 July 1009 (5 years, 205 days) | | John XVIII; IOANNES Duodevicesimus | Giovanni Fasano | c. 965 Rapagnano, Papal States | 43 / 49 | Subject and later the sovereign of the Papal States. First pope born after the Papal States became a state of the Holy Roman Empire in 962. |
| 142 | 31 July 1009 – 12 May 1012 (2 years, 286 days) | | Sergius IV; SERGIVS Quartus | Pietro Martino Boccadiporco, O.S.B. | c. 970 Rome, Papal States | 39 / 42 | Subject and later the sovereign of the Papal States. Member of the Order of Saint Benedict. |
| — | 12 June 1012 – 31 December 1012 (202 days) | | Gregory VI; GREGORIVS Sextus | Gregorio | Rome, Papal States | | Subject and later the claimant of the throne of the Papal States. In opposition to Benedict VIII. Expelled from Rome and deposed. |
| 143 | 18 May 1012 – 9 April 1024 (11 years, 327 days) | | Benedict VIII; BENEDICTVS Octavus | Teofilatto di Tuscolo | c. 980 Rome, Papal States | 32 / 44 | Subject and later the sovereign of the Papal States. Brother of John XIX. |
| 144 | 14 May 1024 – 6 October 1032 (8 years, 145 days) | | John XIX; IOANNES Undevicesimus | Romano di Tuscolo | c. 975 Rome, Papal States | 49 / 57 | Subject and later the sovereign of the Papal States. Brother of Benedict VIII. |
| 145 | 21 October 1032 – 31 December 1044 (12 years, 71 days) | | Benedict IX; BENEDICTVS Nonus | Teofilatto di Tuscolo | c. 1012 Rome, Papal States | 20 / 32 (†43) | Subject and later the sovereign of the Papal States. First term; youngest person to have been pope. |
| 146 | 13 January 1045 – 10 March 1045 (56 days) | | Sylvester III; SILVESTER Tertius | Giovanni dei Crescenzi-Ottaviani | c. 1000 Rome, Papal States | 45 / 45 (†63) | Subject and later the sovereign of the Papal States. Validity of his election questioned; deposed at the Council of Sutri. |
| 147 | 10 March 1045 – 1 May 1045 (52 days) | | Benedict IX; BENEDICTVS Nonus | Teofilatto di Tuscolo | c. 1012 Rome, Papal States | 33 / 33 (†43) | Subject and later the sovereign of the Papal States. Second term; deposed at the Council of Sutri. |
| 148 | 1 May 1045 – 20 December 1046 (1 year, 233 days) | | Gregory VI; GREGORIVS Sextus | Giovanni Graziano Pierleoni | c. 1000 Rome, Papal States | 45 / 46 (†48) | Subject and later the sovereign of the Papal States. Deposed at the Council of Sutri. |
| 149 | 24 December 1046 – 9 October 1047 (289 days) | | Clement II; CLEMENS Secundus | Suidger von Morsleben-Hornburg | c. 967 Hornburg, Duchy of Saxony | 79 / 80 | Subject of the Duchy of Saxony. Appointed by King Henry III at the Council of Sutri; crowned Emperor Henry III in 1046. |
| 150 | 8 November 1047 – 17 July 1048 (252 days) | | Benedict IX; BENEDICTVS Nonus | Teofilatto di Tuscolo | c. 1012 Rome, Papal States | 35 / 36 (†43) | Subject and later the sovereign of the Papal States. Third term; deposed and excommunicated. |
| 151 | 17 July 1048 – 9 August 1048 (23 days) | | Damasus II; DAMASVS Secundus | Poppo von Brixen | c. 1000 Pildenau, Duchy of Bavaria | 48 / 48 | Subject of the Duchy of Bavaria. |
| 152 | 12 February 1049 – 19 April 1054 (5 years, 66 days) | | St Leo IX; LEO Nonus | Bruno von Egisheim-Dagsburg | 21 July 1002 Eguisheim, Duchy of Swabia | 47 / 51 | Subject of the Duchy of Swabia. In 1054, the mutual excommunications of Leo IX's legate, cardinal Humbert of Silva Candida, and Patriarch Michael I Cerularius of Constantinople started the East–West Schism. The mutual anathematizations were rescinded by Paul VI and Patriarch Athenagoras I in 1964. |
| 153 | 13 April 1055 – 28 July 1057 (2 years, 106 days) | | Victor II; VICTOR Secundus | Gebhard von Dollnstein-Hirschberg | c. 1018 Duchy of Swabia | 37 / 39 | Subject of the Duchy of Swabia. |
| 154 | 2 August 1057 – 29 March 1058 (239 days) | | Stephen IX; STEPHANVS Nonus | Friedrich Gozzelon von Lothringen, O.S.B. | c. 1020 Duchy of Lorraine | 37 / 38 | Subject of the Duchy of Lorraine. Last German pope until Benedict XVI (2005–2013). Sometimes called Stephen X. Member of the Order of Saint Benedict. |
| — | 4 April 1058 – 24 January 1059 (295 days) | | Benedict X BENEDICTVS Decimus | Giovanni Mincio di Tuscolo | Rome, Papal States | | Subject and later the claimant of the throne of the Papal States. In opposition to Nicholas II. Captured and deposed. |
| 155 | 6 December 1058 – 27 July 1061 (2 years, 233 days) | | Nicholas II; NICOLAVS Secundus | Gerald de Bourgogne | c. 980 Château de Chevron, County of Savoy | 78 / 81 | Subject of the County of Savoy. Was of French ethnicity. Designated the College of Cardinals as the sole body of pope electors in the bull In nomine Domini (1059). |
| — | 30 September 1061 – 1072 (10 years, 185 days) | | Honorius II; HONORIVS Secundus | Pietro Cadalo | 1010 Verona, March of Verona | 61 / 72 | Subject of the March of Verona. In opposition to Alexander II. |
| 156 | 30 September 1061 – 21 April 1073 (11 years, 203 days) | | Alexander II; ALEXANDER Secundus | Anselmo da Baggio | c. 1018 Baggio, Free Commune of Milan | 46 / 58 | Citizen of the Free Commune of Milan. Authorized the Norman conquest of England. |
| 157 | 22 April 1073 – 25 May 1085 (12 years, 33 days) | | St Gregory VII; GREGORIVS Septimus | Ildebrando di Soana, O.S.B. | c. 1015 Sovana, March of Tuscany | 48 / 60 | Subject of the March of Tuscany. Was of Lombard ethnicity. Initiated the Gregorian Reforms. Restricted the use of the papal title to the bishop of Rome. Member of the Order of Saint Benedict. Political struggle with Emperor Henry IV, who had to go to Canossa (1077). |
| — | 25 June 1080 – 8 September 1100 (20 years, 75 days) | | Clement III; CLEMENS Tertius | Guibert of Ravenna | 1029 Ravenna, Papal States | 51 / 71 | Subject and later the claimant of the throne of the Papal States. In opposition to Gregory VII, Victor III, Urban II, and Paschal II. |
| 158 | 24 May 1086 – 16 September 1087 (1 year, 115 days) | | Bl. Victor III; VICTOR Tertius | Desiderio da Montecassino, O.S.B. | c. 1026 Benevento, Duchy of Benevento | 60 / 61 | Subject of the Duchy of Benevento. Was of Lombard ethnicity. Member of the Order of Saint Benedict. Called the Synod of Benevento (1087), condemning lay investiture. |
| 159 | 12 March 1088 – 29 July 1099 (11 years, 139 days) | | Bl. Urban II; VRBANVS Secundus | Odon de Lagery, O.S.B. | c. 1042 Châtillon-sur-Marne, County of Champagne, Kingdom of France | 46 / 57 | Subject of the Kingdom of France. Preached and started the First Crusade. Member of the Order of Saint Benedict. |
| 160 | 13 August 1099 – 21 January 1118 (18 years, 161 days) | | Paschal II; PASCHALIS Secundus | Raniero di Bleda, O.S.B. | c. 1050 Bleda, March of Tuscany | 49 / 68 | Subject of the March of Tuscany. Was of Lombard ethnicity. Member of the Order of Saint Benedict. Ordered the building of the basilica of Santi Quattro Coronati. |
| — | 8 September 1100 – January 1101 (115 days) | | Theodoric; THEODORICVS | Teodorico | c. 1030 Rome, Papal States | 70 / 71 | Subject and later the claimant of the throne of the Papal States. Was of Lombard ethnicity. In opposition to Paschal II. Captured and sent to a monastery. |

==== 12th century ====
Popes of the 12th century
| Pontiff number | Pontificate | Portrait | Name: English · Latin | Personal name | Date and place of birth | Age at start/ end of papacy | Notes |
|---|---|---|---|---|---|---|---|
| — | January 1101 – February 1102 (1 year, 31 days) | | Adalbert; ADALBERTVS | Adalberto, O.S.B. | Rome, Papal States | | Subject and later the claimant of the throne of the Papal States. Was of Lombard ethnicity. In opposition to Paschal II. Captured and imprisoned. |
| — | 8 November 1105 – 11 April 1111 (5 years, 154 days) | | Sylvester IV; SILVESTER Quartus | Maguinulf | 1050 Rome, Papal States | 49 / 55 (†56) | Subject and later the claimant of the throne of the Papal States. Was of German ethnicity. In opposition to Paschal II. Forced to abdicate. |
| 161 | 24 January 1118 – 29 January 1119 (1 year, 5 days) | | Gelasius II; GELASIVS Secundus | Giovanni Caetani, O.S.B. | c. 1061 Gaeta, Duchy of Gaeta | 57 / 58 | Subject of the Duchy of Gaeta. Member of the Order of Saint Benedict. |
| — | 10 March 1118 – 20 April 1121 (3 years, 41 days) | | Gregory VIII; GREGORIVS Octavus | Maurice Baurdain | c. 1060 Limousin, Occitania, Kingdom of France | 58 / 61 (†77) | Subject of the Kingdom of France. Was of Occitan ethnicity. In opposition to Gelasius II and Callixtus II. Captured and imprisoned. |
| 162 | 2 February 1119 – 13 December 1124 (5 years, 315 days) | | Callixtus II; CALLISTVS Secundus | Gui de Bourgogne | c. 1060 Quingey, County of Burgundy | 59 / 64 | Subject of the County of Burgundy. Was of French ethnicity. Convened the First Council of the Lateran (1123). |
| — | 16 December 1124 – 17 December 1124 (1 day) | | Celestine II; COELESTINVS Secundus | Teobaldo Boccapeci | 1050 Rome, Papal States | 74 / 74 (†76) | Subject and later the claimant of the throne of the Papal States. In opposition to Honorius II. Abdicated one day after his election. |
| 163 | 21 December 1124 – 13 February 1130 (5 years, 54 days) | | Honorius II; HONORIVS Secundus | Lamberto Scannabecchi da Fiagnano, Can.Reg. | 9 February 1060 Fiagnano, Papal States | 64 / 70 | Subject and later the sovereign of the Papal States. Canon Regular of the Lateran. Approved the Knights Templar as a military order (1128). |
| 164 | 14 February 1130 – 24 September 1143 (13 years, 222 days) | | Innocent II; INNOCENTIVS Secundus | Gregorio Papareschi, Can.Reg. | c. 1082 Rome, Papal States | 48 / 61 | Subject and later the sovereign of the Papal States. Canon Regular of the Lateran. Convened the Second Council of the Lateran (1139). |
| — | 14 February 1130 – 25 January 1138 (7 years, 345 days) | | Anacletus II; ANACLETVS Secundus | Pietro Pierleoni, O.S.B. | 1090 Rome, Papal States | 40 / 48 | Subject and later the claimant of the throne of the Papal States. In opposition to Innocent II. |
| — | 15 March 1138 – 29 May 1138 (75 days) | | Victor IV; VICTOR Quartus | Gregorio Conti | Rome, Papal States | | Subject and later the claimant of the throne of the Papal States. In opposition to Innocent II. |
| 165 | 26 September 1143 – 8 March 1144 (164 days) | | Celestine II; COELESTINVS Secundus | Guido Guelfuccio di Castello | c. 1085 Città di Castello, Papal States | 58 / 59 | Subject and later the sovereign of the Papal States. |
| 166 | 12 March 1144 – 15 February 1145 (340 days) | | Lucius II; LUCIVS Secundus | Gherardo Caccianemici dall'Orso, Can.Reg. | c. 1079 Bologna, Papal States | 65 / 66 | Subject and later the sovereign of the Papal States. Canon Regular of San Frediano. |
| 167 | 15 February 1145 – 8 July 1153 (8 years, 143 days) | | Bl. Eugene III; EVGENIVS Tertius | Bernardo Pignatelli, O.Cist. | c. 1080 Pisa, Republic of Pisa | 65 / 73 | Citizen of the Republic of Pisa. Member of the Order of Cistercians. Announced the Second Crusade. |
| 168 | 12 July 1153 – 3 December 1154 (1 year, 144 days) | | Anastasius IV; ANASTASIVS Quartus | Corrado Demetri della Suburra | c. 1073 Rome, Papal States | 80 / 81 | Subject and later the sovereign of the Papal States. |
| 169 | 4 December 1154 – 1 September 1159 (4 years, 271 days) | | Adrian IV; HADRIANVS Quartus | Nicholas Breakspear, Can.Reg. | c. 1100 Abbots Langley, Hertfordshire, Kingdom of England | 54 / 59 | Subject of the Kingdom of England. The only English (Anglo-Saxon) pope; purportedly granted Ireland to King Henry II of England. Canon Regular of Saint-Ruf monastery. |
| 170 | 7 September 1159 – 30 August 1181 (21 years, 357 days) | | Alexander III; ALEXANDER Tertius | Rolando Bandinelli | c. 1100 Siena, March of Tuscany | 59 / 81 | Subject of the March of Tuscany. Convened the Third Council of the Lateran (1179). |
| — | 7 September 1159 – 20 April 1164 (4 years, 226 days) | | Victor IV; VICTOR Quartus | Ottaviano dei Crescenzi Ottaviani di Monticelli | 1095 Rome, Papal States | 64 / 69 | Subject and later the claimant of the throne of the Papal States. In opposition to Alexander III. |
| — | 28 April 1164 – 22 September 1168 (4 years, 147 days) | | Paschal III; PASCHALIS Tertius | Guido di Crema | 1110 Rome, Papal States | 54 / 58 | Subject and later the claimant of the throne of the Papal States. In opposition to Alexander III. |
| — | 30 September 1168 – 29 August 1178 (9 years, 333 days) | | Callixtus III; CALLIXTVS Tertius | Giovanni di Struma, O.S.B. | 1090 Rome, Papal States | 78 / 88 | Subject and later the claimant of the throne of the Papal States. In opposition to Alexander III. |
| — | 29 September 1179 – January 1180 (124 days) | | Innocent III; INNOCENTIVS Tertius | Lando (or Lanzo) di Sezze | 1120 Sezze, Papal States | 59 / 60 (†63) | Subject and later the claimant of the throne of the Papal States. In opposition to Alexander III. Captured and imprisoned in 1180. |
| 171 | 1 September 1181 – 25 November 1185 (4 years, 85 days) | | Lucius III; LUCIVS Tertius | Ubaldo Allucignoli | c. 1100 Lucca, March of Tuscany | 81 / 85 | Subject of the March of Tuscany. |
| 172 | 25 November 1185 – 20 October 1187 (1 year, 329 days) | | Urban III; VRBANVS Tertius | Uberto Crivelli | c. 1120 Cuggiono, small town closer to the Free Commune of Milan | 65 / 67 | Was of Italian ethnicity. In the 21st century, Cuggiono is a small Italian town and comune in the Metropolitan City of Milan. |
| 173 | 21 October 1187 – 17 December 1187 (57 days) | | Gregory VIII; GREGORIVS Octavus | Alberto di Morra, O.Praem. | c. 1100 Benevento, Papal States | 87 / 87 | Subject and later the sovereign of the Papal States. Canon Regular Premonstratense. Proposed the Third Crusade. |
| 174 | 19 December 1187 – 20 March 1191 (3 years, 91 days) | | Clement III; CLEMENS Tertius | Paolo Scolari | c. 1130 Rome, Papal States | 57 / 61 | Subject and later the sovereign of the Papal States. |
| 175 | 30 March 1191 – 8 January 1198 (6 years, 284 days) | | Celestine III; COELESTINVS Tertius | Giacinto Bobone Orsini | c. 1105 Rome, Papal States | 86 / 93 | Motto: Perfice gressus meos in semitis Tuis ("Going in Thy path") Subject and later the sovereign of the Papal States. Confirmed the statutes of the Teutonic Knights as a military order. |
| 176 | 8 January 1198 – 16 July 1216 (18 years, 190 days) | | Innocent III; INNOCENTIVS Tertius | Lotario dei Conti di Segni | c. 1161 Gavignano, Papal States | 37 / 55 | Subject and later the sovereign of the Papal States. Convened the Fourth Council of the Lateran (1215). Initiated the Fourth Crusade but later distanced himself from it and threatened its participants with excommunication when its leadership abandoned their focus on conquest of the Holy Land and instead decided to sack Christian cities. Endorsed the Franciscan Order. |

==== 13th century ====
Popes of the 13th century
| Pontiff number | Pontificate | Portrait | Name: English · Latin | Personal name | Date and place of birth | Age at start/ end of papacy | Notes |
|---|---|---|---|---|---|---|---|
| 177 | 18 July 1216 – 18 March 1227 (10 years, 243 days) | | Honorius III; HONORIVS Tertius | Cencio Savelli | c. 1150 Rome, Papal States | 66 / 77 | Subject and later the sovereign of the Papal States. Initiated the Fifth Crusade. Approved several religious and tertiary orders. |
| 178 | 19 March 1227 – 22 August 1241 (14 years, 156 days) | | Gregory IX; GREGORIVS Nonus | Ugolino dei Conti di Segni | c. 1145 Anagni, Papal States | 82 / 96 | Subject and later the sovereign of the Papal States. Initiated the inquisition in France and endorsed the Northern Crusades. |
| 179 | 25 October 1241 – 10 November 1241 (16 days) | | Celestine IV; COELESTINVS Quartus | Goffredo Castiglioni | c. 1180; Free Commune of Milan (city-state) | 61 / 61 | Citizen of the Free Commune of Milan. Died before coronation. |
| 180 | 25 June 1243 – 7 December 1254 (11 years, 165 days) | | Innocent IV; INNOCENTIVS Quartus | Sinibaldo Fieschi | c. 1195 Genoa, Republic of Genoa | 48 / 60 | Citizen of the Republic of Genoa. Convened the First Council of Lyon (1245). Issued the bull Ad extirpanda (1252), permitting the torture of heretics. |
| 181 | 12 December 1254 – 25 May 1261 (6 years, 164 days) | | Alexander IV; ALEXANDER Quartus | Rinaldo dei Conti di Segni | c. 1185–1199 Jenne, Papal States | 55–69 / 62–76 | Subject and later the sovereign of the Papal States. Restored the papal inquisition in France. |
| 182 | 29 August 1261 – 2 October 1264 (3 years, 34 days) | | Urban IV; VRBANVS Quartus | Jacques Pantaléon | c. 1195 Troyes, County of Champagne, Kingdom of France | 66 / 69 | Subject of the Kingdom of France. Instituted the feast of Corpus Christi (1264). |
| 183 | 5 February 1265 – 29 November 1268 (3 years, 298 days) | | Clement IV; CLEMENS Quartus | Gui Foucois | 23 November 1190 Saint-Gilles, Languedoc, Kingdom of France | 62 / 66 | Subject of the Kingdom of France. |
| — | 29 November 1268 – 1 September 1271 (2 years, 276 days) | | Interregnum | | | | Almost three-year period without a valid pope elected. This was due to a deadlock among cardinals voting for the pope. |
| 184 | 1 September 1271 – 10 January 1276 (4 years, 131 days) | | Bl. Gregory X GREGORIVS Decimus | Teobaldo Visconti | c. 1210; Free Commune of Piacenza (city-state) | 61 / 66 | Citizen of the Free Commune of Piacenza. Convened the Second Council of Lyon and issued the bull Ubi periculum (1274), regulating conclaves until the 20th century. |
| 185 | 21 January 1276 – 22 June 1276 (153 days) | | Bl. Innocent V INNOCENTIVS Quintus | Pierre de Tarentaise, O.P. | c. 1225 County of Savoy | 52 / 52 | Subject of the County of Savoy. Was of French ethnicity. Member of the Dominican Order. First pope elected in a conclave. |
| 186 | 11 July 1276 – 18 August 1276 (38 days) | | Adrian V HADRIANVS Quintus | Ottobuono Fieschi | c. 1216 Genoa, Republic of Genoa | 60 / 60 | Citizen of the Republic of Genoa. Annulled Gregory X's Ubi periculum regarding the regulations of conclaves. |
| 187 | 8 September 1276 – 20 May 1277 (254 days) | | John XXI; IOANNES Vicesimus Primus | Pedro Julião | c. 1215 Lisbon, Kingdom of Portugal | 61 / 62 | Subject of the Kingdom of Portugal. Due to a confusion over the numbering of popes named John in the 13th century, the ordinal XX was skipped. |
| 188 | 25 November 1277 – 22 August 1280 (2 years, 271 days) | | Nicholas III; NICOLAVS Tertius | Giovanni Gaetano Orsini | c. 1216 Rome, Papal States | 61 / 64 | Subject and later the sovereign of the Papal States. |
| 189 | 22 February 1281 – 28 March 1285 (4 years, 34 days) | | Martin IV; MARTINVS Quartus | Simon de Brion | c. 1210 Meinpicien, Touraine, Kingdom of France | 71 / 75 | Subject of the Kingdom of France. Sicilian Vespers; ordered the Aragonese Crusade. |
| 190 | 2 April 1285 – 3 April 1287 (2 years, 1 day) | | Honorius IV; HONORIVS Quartus | Giacomo Savelli | c. 1210 Rome, Papal States | 75 / 77 | Subject and later the sovereign of the Papal States. |
| 191 | 22 February 1288 – 4 April 1292 (4 years, 42 days) | | Nicholas IV; NICOLAVS Quartus | Girolamo Masci, O.F.M. | 30 September 1227 Lisciano, Papal States | 60 / 64 | Subject and later the sovereign of the Papal States. Member of the Franciscan Order. |
| — | 4 April 1292 – 5 July 1294 (2 years, 92 days) | | Interregnum | | | | Two-year period without a valid pope elected. This was due to a deadlock among cardinals voting for the pope. |
| 192 | 5 July 1294 – 13 December 1294 (161 days) | | St Celestine V COELESTINVS Quintus | Pietro Angelerio da Morrone, O.S.B. | c. 1215 Sant'Angelo Limosano, Kingdom of Sicily | 79 / 79 (†81) | Subject of the Kingdom of Sicily. Member of the Order of Saint Benedict. Founded the Celestines. Reinstituted the rules of Ubi periculum. Last pope to abdicate on his own initiative until Benedict XVI (2013). Imprisoned and rumoured to have been murdered by order of Boniface VIII to prevent his potential election and installation as antipope. |
| 193 | 24 December 1294 – 11 October 1303 (8 years, 291 days) | | Boniface VIII; BONIFATIVS Octavus | Benedetto Caetani | c. 1230 Anagni, Papal States | 64 / 73 | Subject and later the sovereign of the Papal States. Incorporated Ubi periculum into the canon law (1298). Formalized the jubilee (1300). Issued the bull Unam sanctam (1302), proclaiming papal supremacy and pushing it to its highest historical extreme. |

==== 14th century ====
Popes of the 14th century
| Pontiff number | Pontificate | Portrait | Name: English · Latin | Personal name | Date and place of birth | Age at start/ end of papacy | Notes |
|---|---|---|---|---|---|---|---|
| 194 | 22 October 1303 – 7 July 1304 (259 days) | | Bl. Benedict XI; BENEDICTVS Undecimus | Niccolò Boccasini, O.P. | c. 1240 Treviso, Papal States | 63 / 64 | Motto: Illustra faciem Tuam super servum Tuum ("Let Your face shine upon Your servant") Subject and later the sovereign of the Papal States. Member of the Dominican Order. Reverted Boniface VIII's Unam sanctam. |
| 195 | 5 June 1305 – 20 April 1314 (8 years, 319 days) | | Clement V CLEMENS Quintus | Raymond Bertrand de Got (or Goth) | c. 1264 Villandraut, Gascony, Kingdom of France | 41 / 50 | Subject of the Kingdom of France. Moved the papacy to Avignon (1309). Convened the Council of Vienne (1311–1312). Initiated the persecution of the Knights Templar with the bull Pastoralis Praeeminentiae under pressure from King Philip IV of France. |
| — | 20 April 1314 – 7 August 1316 (2 years, 79 days) | | Interregnum | | | | Two-year period without a valid pope elected. This was due to a deadlock among cardinals voting for the pope. |
| 196 | 7 August 1316 – 4 December 1334 (18 years, 119 days) | | John XXII; IOANNES Vicesimus Secundus | Jacques Duèze (or d'Euse) | c. 1244 Cahors, Quercy, Kingdom of France | 72 / 90 | Subject of the Kingdom of France. Pope at Avignon. Controversial for his views on the beatific vision. Opposed the Franciscan understanding of the poverty of Christ and his apostles, famously leading William of Ockham to write against unlimited papal power. |
| — | 12 May 1328 – 25 July 1330 (2 years, 74 days) | | Nicholas V NICOLAVS Quintus | Pietro Rainalducci, O.F.M. | 1260 Corvaro, Papal States | 68 / 70 (†73) | Subject and later the claimant of the throne of the Papal States. In opposition to John XXII. Excommunicated and submitted to John XXII. |
| 197 | 20 December 1334 – 25 April 1342 (7 years, 126 days) | | Benedict XII; BENEDICTVS Duodecimus | Jacques Fournier, O.Cist. | 1285 Saverdun, County of Foix, Kingdom of France | 49 / 57 | Subject of the Kingdom of France. Pope at Avignon. Member of the Order of Cistercians. Known for issuing the apostolic constitution Benedictus Deus (1336). A careful pope who reformed monastic orders and opposed nepotism. |
| 198 | 7 May 1342 – 6 December 1352 (10 years, 213 days) | | Clement VI; CLEMENS Sextus | Pierre Roger, O.S.B. | c. 1291 Maumont, Limousin, Kingdom of France | 51 / 61 | Subject of the Kingdom of France. Pope at Avignon. Reigned during the Black Death and absolved those who died from it of their sins. |
| 199 | 18 December 1352 – 12 September 1362 (9 years, 268 days) | | Innocent VI; INNOCENTIVS Sextus | Étienne Aubert | c. 1282 Les Monts, Limousin, Kingdom of France | 70 / 80 | Subject of the Kingdom of France. Pope at Avignon. Through his exertions, the Treaty of Brétigny was signed and ratified. |
| 200 | 28 September 1362 – 19 December 1370 (8 years, 82 days) | | Bl. Urban V VRBANVS Quintus | Guillaume de Grimoard, O.S.B. | 1310 Grizac, Languedoc, Kingdom of France | 52 / 60 | Subject of the Kingdom of France. Pope at Avignon. Member of the Order of Saint Benedict. Reformed areas of education and sent missionary movements across Europe and Asia. His pontificate witnessed the Alexandrian and Savoyard crusades. |
| 201 | 30 December 1370 – 27 March 1378 (7 years, 87 days) | | Gregory XI; GREGORIVS Undecimus | Pierre Roger de Beaufort | c. 1329 Maumont, Limousin, Kingdom of France | 41 / 49 | Subject of the Kingdom of France. Pope at Avignon; returned the seat of the papacy to Rome (1377). Last French pope. |
| 202 | 8 April 1378 – 15 October 1389 (11 years, 190 days) | | Urban VI; VRBANVS Sextus | Bartolomeo Prignano | c. 1318 Naples, Kingdom of Naples | 60 / 71 | Subject of the Kingdom of Naples. Last pope to be elected outside the College of Cardinals. Reigned during the Western Schism. |
| — | 20 September 1378 – 16 September 1394 (15 years, 353 days) | | Clement VII; CLEMENS Septimus | Robert de Genève | 1342 Chateau d'Annecy, County of Savoy | 36 / 52 | Subject of the County of Savoy. Western Schism. In opposition to Urban VI and Boniface IX. |
| 203 | 2 November 1389 – 1 October 1404 (14 years, 334 days) | | Boniface IX; BONIFATIVS Nonus | Pietro Cybo Tomacelli | c. 1350 Naples, Kingdom of Naples | 39 / 54 | Subject of the Kingdom of Naples. Reigned during the Western Schism. |
| — | 28 September 1394 – 23 May 1423 (28 years, 237 days) | | Benedict XIII; BENEDICTVS Tertius Decimus | Pedro Martínez de Luna y Pérez de Gotor | 25 November 1328 Illueca, Kingdom of Aragon | 66 / 94 | Subject of the Kingdom of Aragon. Western Schism. In opposition to Boniface IX, Innocent VII, Gregory XII, Martin V, and the Pisan Antipopes Alexander V and John XXIII. Excommunicated on 27 July 1417. |

==== 15th century ====
Popes of the 15th century
| Pontiff number | Pontificate | Portrait | Name: English · Latin | Personal name | Date and place of birth | Age at start/ end of papacy | Notes |
|---|---|---|---|---|---|---|---|
| 204 | 17 October 1404 – 6 November 1406 (2 years, 20 days) | | Innocent VII; INNOCENTIVS Septimus | Cosimo Gentile Migliorati | 1339 Sulmona, Kingdom of Naples | 65 / 67 | Subject of the Kingdom of Naples. Reigned during the Western Schism. |
| 205 | 30 November 1406 – 4 July 1415 (8 years, 216 days) | | Gregory XII; GREGORIVS Duodecimus | Angelo Correr | c. 1326 Venice, Republic of Venice | 80 / 89 (†91) | Citizen of the Republic of Venice. Reigned during the Western Schism. Confirmed the Council of Constance (1415); convinced to abdicate to end the Western Schism. Last pope to abdicate until Benedict XVI (2013). |
| — | 30 June 1409 – 3 May 1410 (307 days) | | Alexander V ALEXANDER Quintus | Pétros Philárgēs, O.F.M. | 1339 Neapoli, Candia, Republic of Venice | 70 / 71 | Citizen of the Republic of Venice. Was of Greek ethnicity. Western Schism. In opposition to Gregory XII. Considered a legitimate pope until 1963 and is still numbered as such to this day. |
| — | 25 May 1410 – 29 May 1415 (5 years, 4 days) | | John XXIII; IOANNES Vicesimus Tertius | Baldassarre Cossa | 1365 Procida, Kingdom of Naples | 45 / 50 (†54) | Subject of the Kingdom of Naples. Western Schism. In opposition to Gregory XII. Convened the Council of Constance (1414). Deposed. Became the dean of the College of Cardinals in 1417. Was considered a legitimate pope until 1958. |
| — | 4 July 1415 – 11 November 1417 (2 years, 136 days) | | Interregnum | | | | Two-year period without a valid pope elected. The Council of Constance (1414–1418) called on all three papal claimants to abdicate, but only Gregory XII (Roman) did. Benedict XIII (Avignon) was excommunicated, John XXIII (Pisan) was deposed, and a new pope (Martin V) was elected. |
| 206 | 11 November 1417 – 20 February 1431 (13 years, 101 days) | | Martin V MARTINVS Quintus | Oddone Colonna | January–February 1368 Genazzano, Papal States | 49 / 63 | Subject and later the sovereign of the Papal States. His election effectively ended the Western Schism. Convened the Council of Basel (1431); initiated the Hussite Wars. |
| — | 10 June 1423 – 26 July 1429 (6 years, 36 days) | | Clement VIII; CLEMENS Octavus | Gil Sánchez Muñoz y Carbón | 1369 Teruel, Kingdom of Aragon | 54 / 60 (†77) | Subject of the Kingdom of Aragon. Western Schism. In opposition to Martin V. Later submitted to Martin V. |
| — | 1424 – 1429 (5 years) | | Benedict XIV; BENEDICTVS Quartus Decimus | Bernard Garnier | Kingdom of France | | Subject of the Kingdom of France. Two antipope claimants. |
| — | 1430 – 1437 (7 years) | | Benedict XIV; BENEDICTVS Quartus Decimus | Jean Carrier | Kingdom of France | | Subject of the Kingdom of France. Two antipope claimants. |
| 207 | 3 March 1431 – 23 February 1447 (15 years, 357 days) | | Eugene IV; EVGENIVS Quartus | Gabriele Condulmer, Can.Reg. | 1383 Venice, Republic of Venice | 48 / 64 | Citizen of the Republic of Venice. Nephew of Gregory XII. Canon Regular of San Giorgio in Alga. Crowned Emperor Sigismund at Rome in 1433. Issued the papal bull Creator Omnium (1434), rescinding any recognition of Portugal's right to conquer the still-pagan Canary Islands and excommunicating anyone who enslaved the newly-converted Christians, the penalty to stand until the captives were restored to their freedom and possessions. Transferred the Council of Basel to Ferrara (1438); it was eventually transferred again to Florence (1439–1445) to avoid the bubonic plague. |
| — | 5 November 1439 – 7 April 1449 (9 years, 153 days) | | Felix V FELIX Quintus | Amédée de Savoie | 4 September 1383 Chambéry, County of Savoy | 56 / 65 (†67) | Subject of the County of Savoy. In opposition to Eugene IV and Nicholas V. Later submitted to Nicholas V. Also ruled as count and then duke of Savoy. |
| 208 | 6 March 1447 – 24 March 1455 (8 years, 18 days) | | Nicholas V NICOLAVS Quintus | Tommaso Parentucelli | 13 November 1397 Sarzana, Republic of Genoa | 49 / 57 | Citizen of the Republic of Genoa. Held the 1450 jubilee. Crowned Emperor Frederick III at Rome in 1452. Issued the bull Dum Diversas (1452), recognizing Portugal's right to conquer and subjugate the Saracens and pagans. Created a library in the Vatican, which would eventually become the Bibliotheca Apostolica Vaticana. |
| 209 | 8 April 1455 – 6 August 1458 (3 years, 120 days) | | Callixtus III; CALLISTVS Tertius | Alfons de Borja | 31 December 1378 Xàtiva, Kingdom of Valencia | 76 / 79 | Subject of the Kingdom of Valencia (and therefore subject of the Crown of Aragon). First Valencian pope. Instituted the Feast of the Transfiguration to be celebrated on 6 August. Ordered the retrial of Joan of Arc, leading to her vindication. Elevated his nephews to cardinals, one of whom later became Pope Alexander VI. |
| 210 | 19 August 1458 – 15 August 1464 (5 years, 362 days) | | Pius II; PIVS Secundus | Enea Silvio Bartolomeo Piccolomini | 18 October 1405 Corsignano, Republic of Siena | 52 / 58 | Citizen of the Republic of Siena. Displayed a great interest in urban planning. Founded Pienza near Siena as the ideal city in 1462. Known for his work on the Commentaries. |
| 211 | 30 August 1464 – 26 July 1471 (6 years, 330 days) | | Paul II; PAVLVS Secundus | Pietro Barbo | 23 February 1417 Venice, Republic of Venice | 47 / 54 | Citizen of the Republic of Venice. Nephew of Eugene IV. Built the Palazzo San Marco (now Palazzo Venezia). Approved the introduction of printing in the Papal States. |
| 212 | 9 August 1471 – 12 August 1484 (13 years, 3 days) | | Sixtus IV; XYSTVS Quartus | Francesco della Rovere, O.F.M. | 21 July 1414 Celle Ligure, Republic of Genoa | 57 / 70 | Citizen of the Republic of Genoa. Member of the Franciscan Order. Commissioned the Sistine Chapel and created the Vatican Archives. Authorized the Spanish Inquisition at the request of the Catholic Monarchs of Spain, targeting converted Jewish Christians in Spain. A patron of the arts; he brought together the group of artists who ushered the Early Renaissance into Rome with the first masterpieces of the city's new artistic age. Known for his nepotism and involvement in the Pazzi conspiracy. |
| 213 | 29 August 1484 – 25 July 1492 (7 years, 331 days) | | Innocent VIII; INNOCENTIVS Octavus | Giovanni Battista Cybo | 1432 Genoa, Republic of Genoa | 52 / 60 | Citizen of the Republic of Genoa. Appointed Tomás de Torquemada as the inquisitor general of the Spanish Inquisition. Endorsed the prosecution of witchcraft in the bull Summis desiderantes affectibus (1484). |
| 214 | 11 August 1492 – 18 August 1503 (11 years, 7 days) | | Alexander VI; ALEXANDER Sextus | Roderic Llançol i de Borja | 1 January 1431 Xàtiva, Kingdom of Valencia | 61 / 72 | Subject of the Kingdom of Valencia (and therefore subject of the Crown of Aragon). Nephew of Callixtus III; father to both Cesare Borgia and Lucrezia Borgia. Divided the extra-European world between Spain and Portugal in the papal bull Inter caetera (1493). Considered as one of the most controversial of the Renaissance popes, partly because he acknowledged fathering several children by his mistresses. As a result, his Italianized Valencian surname, Borgia, became a byword for libertinism and nepotism, traditionally considered as characterizing his pontificate. |

==== 16th century ====
Popes of the 16th century
| Pontiff number | Pontificate | Portrait | Name: English · Latin | Personal name | Date and place of birth | Age at start/ end of papacy | Notes |
|---|---|---|---|---|---|---|---|
| 215 | 22 September 1503 – 18 October 1503 (26 days) | | Pius III; PIVS Tertius | Francesco Todeschini-Piccolomini | 29 May 1439 Siena, Republic of Siena | 64 / 64 | Citizen of the Republic of Siena. Nephew of Pius II. Founded the Piccolomini Library in the Siena Cathedral. |
| 216 | 31 October 1503 – 21 February 1513 (9 years, 113 days) | | Julius II; IVLIVS Secundus | Giuliano della Rovere, O.F.M. | 5 December 1443 Albisola, Republic of Genoa | 59 / 69 | Citizen of the Republic of Genoa. Nephew of Sixtus IV. Member of the Franciscan Order. Nicknamed the "Warrior Pope" or the "Fearsome Pope". Became pope in the context of the Italian Wars, a period in which the major powers of Europe fought for primacy in the Italian peninsula. Took control of all the Papal States for the first time. Established the Vatican Museums and initiated the rebuilding of St. Peter's Basilica. The same year, he organized the famous Swiss Guard for his personal protection and commanded a successful campaign in Romagna against the local lords. The interests of Julius II also lay in the New World, as he ratified the Treaty of Tordesillas (1506), establishing the first bishoprics in the Americas and starting the catholicization of Latin America. Commissioned the four Raphael Rooms and Michelangelo's paintings in the Sistine Chapel (1508). Convened the Fifth Council of the Lateran (1512). Julius II was described by Machiavelli in his works as the ideal prince. Julius II allowed people seeking indulgences to donate money to the Church, which would be used for the construction of St. Peter's Basilica. |
| 217 | 9 March 1513 – 1 December 1521 (8 years, 267 days) | | Leo X LEO Decimus | Giovanni di Lorenzo de' Medici | 11 December 1475 Florence, Republic of Florence | 37 / 45 | Citizen of the Republic of Florence. Son of Lorenzo the Magnificent. Closed the Fifth Council of the Lateran (1517). Remembered for granting indulgences to those who donated to rebuild St. Peter's Basilica and for excommunicating Martin Luther (1521). Extended the Spanish Inquisition into Portugal. Borrowed and spent money without circumspection and was a significant patron of the arts. Under his reign, progress was made on the rebuilding of St. Peter's Basilica, and artists such as Raphael decorated the Vatican rooms. Leo X also reorganized the Roman University and promoted the study of literature, poetry, and antiquities. Last pope to not have been in the priestly orders at the time of his election to the papacy. |
| 218 | 9 January 1522 – 14 September 1523 (1 year, 248 days) | | Adrian VI; HADRIANVS Sextus | Adriaan Floriszoon Boeyens | 2 March 1459 Utrecht, Bishopric of Utrecht | 62 / 64 | Motto: Patere et sustine ("Respect and wait") Subject of the Bishopric of Utrecht. The only Dutch pope; last non-Italian to be elected pope until John Paul II in 1978. Tutor of Emperor Charles V. Came to the papacy in the midst of one of its greatest crises, threatened not only by Lutheranism to the north, but also by the advance of the Ottoman Turks to the east. He refused to compromise with Lutheranism theologically, demanding Martin Luther's condemnation as a heretic. However, he is noted for his attempt to reform the Catholic Church administratively in response to the Protestant Reformation. Adrian VI's remarkable admission that the turmoil of the Church was the fault of the Roman Curia itself was read at the 1522–1523 Diet of Nuremberg. His efforts at reform, however, proved fruitless, as they were resisted by most of his Renaissance ecclesiastical contemporaries, and he did not live long enough to see his efforts through to their conclusion. |
| 219 | 26 November 1523 – 25 September 1534 (10 years, 303 days) | | Clement VII; CLEMENS Septimus | Giulio di Giuliano de' Medici | 26 May 1478 Florence, Republic of Florence | 45 / 56 | Motto: Candor illaesus ("Unharmed candor") Citizen of the Republic of Florence. Cousin of Leo X. Rome was sacked by imperial troops (1527). Forbade the divorce of King Henry VIII of England. Crowned Emperor Charles V at Bologna in 1530. Commissioned Michelangelo's painting of The Last Judgment in the Sistine Chapel (1533). Approved Copernicus's heliocentric model of the universe (1533). The niece of the pope was married to the future Henry II of France (1533). Recognized the Order of Friars Minor Capuchin (Capuchins). |
| 220 | 13 October 1534 – 10 November 1549 (15 years, 28 days) | | Paul III; PAVLVS Tertius | Alessandro Farnese | 29 February 1468 Canino, Papal States | 66 / 81 | Subject and later the sovereign of the Papal States. Recognized the Jesuits (1540). Opened the Council of Trent (1545). His illegitimate son became the first duke of Parma. Decreed the second and final excommunication of King Henry VIII of England. Appointed Michelangelo to supervise construction of St. Peter's Basilica (1546). |
| 221 | 7 February 1550 – 29 March 1555 (5 years, 50 days) | | Julius III; IVLIVS Tertius | Giovanni Maria Ciocchi del Monte | 10 September 1487 Rome, Papal States | 62 / 67 | Subject and later the sovereign of the Papal States. Reopened the Council of Trent (1551). Established the Collegium Germanicum (1552). The Innocenzo Scandal. |
| 222 | 9 April 1555 – 1 May 1555 (22 days) | | Marcellus II; MARCELLVS Secundus | Marcello Cervini degli Spannochi | 6 May 1501 Montefano, Papal States | 53 / 53 | Subject and later the sovereign of the Papal States. Last to use his birth name as his papal name. Instituted immediate economies in the expenditure of the Holy See. The Missa Papae Marcelli was composed in his honour. |
| 223 | 23 May 1555 – 18 August 1559 (4 years, 87 days) | | Paul IV; PAVLVS Quartus | Gian Pietro Carafa, C.R. | 28 June 1476 Capriglia Irpina, Kingdom of Naples | 78 / 83 | Motto: Dominus mihi adjutor ("The Lord is my helper") Subject of the Kingdom of Naples. Founder and member of the Theatines. Established the Roman Ghetto in the bull Cum nimis absurdum (1555) and published the Index of Forbidden Books (1559). Ordered Michelangelo to repaint the nude figures in The Last Judgment modestly. |
| 224 | 26 December 1559 – 9 December 1565 (5 years, 348 days) | | Pius IV; PIVS Quartus | Giovanni Angelo Medici | 31 March 1499 Milan, Duchy of Milan | 60 / 66 | Subject of the Duchy of Milan. Reopened and closed the Council of Trent (1563). Ordered public construction to improve the water supply of Rome. Instituted the Tridentine Creed. |
| 225 | 7 January 1566 – 1 May 1572 (6 years, 115 days) | | St Pius V PIVS Quintus | Antonio Ghislieri, O.P. | 17 January 1504 Bosco, Duchy of Milan | 61 / 68 | Motto: Utinam dirigantur viae meae ad custodiendas ("O that my ways may be steadfast in keeping Thy statutes") Subject of the Duchy of Milan. Member of the Dominican Order, with the religious name Michele. Excommunicated Queen Elizabeth I of England. Issued the 1570 Roman Missal. Battle of Lepanto (1571); instituted the feast of Our Lady of Victory. |
| 226 | 13 May 1572 – 10 April 1585 (12 years, 322 days) | | Gregory XIII; GREGORIVS Tertius Decimus | Ugo Boncompagni | 7 January 1502 Bologna, Papal States | 70 / 83 | Motto: Aperuit et clausit ("Opened and closed") Subject and later the sovereign of the Papal States. Built the Gregorian Chapel in the Vatican. First pope to bestow the Immaculate Conception as the patron saint of the Philippine Islands through the bull Ilius Fulti Praesido (1579). Strengthened diplomatic ties with Asian nations. Reformed the calendar (1582). |
| 227 | 24 April 1585 – 27 August 1590 (5 years, 125 days) | | Sixtus V XYSTVS Quintus | Felice Piergentile, O.F.M. Conv. | 13 December 1521 Grottammare, Papal States | 63 / 68 | Motto: Aqua et panis, vita canis ("Water and bread are a dog's life") Subject and later the sovereign of the Papal States. Member of the Conventual Franciscan Order. Fixed and completed building works to major basilicas in Rome. Limited the College of Cardinals to 70 in number; doubled the number of Curial congregations (1588). |
| 228 | 15 September 1590 – 27 September 1590 (12 days) | | Urban VII; VRBANVS Septimus | Giovanni Battista Castagna | 4 August 1521 Rome, Papal States | 69 / 69 | Subject and later the sovereign of the Papal States. Supported by Spain. Shortest-reigning pope; died before coronation. Set the first known worldwide smoking ban, banning smoking in and near all churches. |
| 229 | 5 December 1590 – 16 October 1591 (315 days) | | Gregory XIV; GREGORIVS Quartus Decimus | Niccolò Sfondrati | 11 February 1535 Somma Lombardo, Duchy of Milan | 55 / 56 | Subject of the Duchy of Milan. Modified the constitution Effraenatam of Sixtus V so that the penalty for abortion did not apply until the foetus became animated. Made gambling on papal elections punishable by excommunication through the bull Cogit nos (1591) to maintain the sanctity and seriousness of the election process. |
| 230 | 29 October 1591 – 30 December 1591 (62 days) | | Innocent IX; INNOCENTIVS Nonus | Giovanni Antonio Facchinetti | 20 July 1519 Bologna, Papal States | 72 / 72 | Subject and later the sovereign of the Papal States. Supported the cause of King Philip II of Spain and the Catholic League against King Henry IV of France in the French Wars of Religion. Prohibited alienation of church property. |
| 231 | 30 January 1592 – 3 March 1605 (13 years, 32 days) | | Clement VIII; CLEMENS Octavus | Ippolito Aldobrandini | 24 February 1536 Fano, Papal States | 55 / 69 | Subject and later the sovereign of the Papal States. Initiated an alliance of European Christian powers to partake in the war with the Ottoman Empire known as the Long War (1595). Convened the Congregatio de Auxiliis, addressing the doctrinal disputes between the Dominicans and Jesuits regarding free will and divine grace. |

==== 17th century ====
Popes of the 17th century
| Pontiff number | Pontificate | Portrait | Name: English · Latin | Personal name | Date and place of birth | Age at start/ end of papacy | Notes |
|---|---|---|---|---|---|---|---|
| 232 | 1 April 1605 – 27 April 1605 (26 days) | | Leo XI; LEO Undecimus | Alessandro Ottaviano de' Medici | 2 June 1535 Florence, Duchy of Florence | 69 / 69 | Subject of the Duchy of Florence. Great-nephew of Leo X. Called the "Lightning Pope" (Papa Lampo) due to his brief pontificate. |
| 233 | 16 May 1605 – 28 January 1621 (15 years, 257 days) | | Paul V PAVLVS Quintus | Camillo Borghese | 17 September 1550/1552 Rome, Papal States | | Motto: Absit nisi in Te gloriari ("May it be absent, except to glory in You") Subject and later the sovereign of the Papal States. Known for financing many building projects, including the facade of St. Peter's Basilica. Established the Bank of the Holy Spirit (1605). Restored the Aqua Traiana. |
| 234 | 9 February 1621 – 8 July 1623 (2 years, 149 days) | | Gregory XV; GREGORIVS Quintus Decimus | Alessandro Ludovisi | 9 January 1554 Bologna, Papal States | 67 / 69 | Subject and later the sovereign of the Papal States. Issued the bull Aeterni Patris Filius (1621), which imposed conclaves to be by secret ballot. Established the Congregation for the Propagation of the Faith (1622). Issued the apostolic constitution Omnipotentis Dei (1623) against magicians and witches. |
| 235 | 6 August 1623 – 29 July 1644 (20 years, 358 days) | | Urban VIII; VRBANVS Octavus | Maffeo Vincenzo Barberini | 5 April 1568 Florence, Grand Duchy of Tuscany | 55 / 76 | Subject of the Grand Duchy of Tuscany. Issued a bill that made the use of tobacco in holy places punishable by excommunication (1624). Trial against Galileo Galilei. Last pope to expand the papal territory by force of arms. |
| 236 | 15 September 1644 – 7 January 1655 (10 years, 114 days) | | Innocent X INNOCENTIVS Decimus | Giovanni Battista Pamphili | 6 May 1574 Rome, Papal States | 70 / 80 | Motto: Alleviatae sunt aquae super terram ("The waters are lifted above the earth") Subject and later the sovereign of the Papal States. Great-great-great-grandson of Alexander VI. Erected the Fontana dei Quattro Fiumi in Piazza Navona. Opposed the Peace of Westphalia. Issued the apostolic constitution Cum occasione (1653), condemning the five doctrines of Jansenism. |
| 237 | 7 April 1655 – 22 May 1667 (12 years, 45 days) | | Alexander VII; ALEXANDER Septimus | Fabio Chigi | 13 February 1599 Siena, Grand Duchy of Tuscany | 56 / 68 | Subject of the Grand Duchy of Tuscany. Great-nephew of Paul V. Commissioned St. Peter's Square. Issued the apostolic constitution Sollicitudo Omnium Ecclesiarum that set the doctrine of Immaculate Conception (1661), almost identical to that of Pius IX nearly two centuries later. |
| 238 | 20 June 1667 – 9 December 1669 (2 years, 172 days) | | Clement IX; CLEMENS Nonus | Giulio Rospigliosi | 28 January 1600 Pistoia, Grand Duchy of Tuscany | 67 / 69 | Motto: Aliis non sibi clemens ("Clement to others, not to himself") Subject of the Grand Duchy of Tuscany. Mediated in the Peace of Aachen (1668). |
| 239 | 29 April 1670 – 22 July 1676 (6 years, 84 days) | | Clement X CLEMENS Decimus | Emilio Bonaventura Altieri | 13 July 1590 Rome, Papal States | 79 / 86 | Motto: Bonum auget malum minuit ("He increases good and diminishes evil") Subject and later the sovereign of the Papal States. Canonized the first saint from the Americas: St Rose of Lima (1671). Decorated the bridge of Sant' Angelo with the ten statues of angels and commissioned one of the two fountains adorning the piazza of St. Peter's Square. Regulated the removal of relics of saints from sacred cemeteries. |
| 240 | 21 September 1676 – 12 August 1689 (12 years, 325 days) | | Bl. Innocent XI; INNOCENTIVS Undecimus | Benedetto Odescalchi | 16 May 1611 Como, Duchy of Milan | 65 / 78 | Motto: Avarus non implebitur ("The covetous man is not satisfied") Subject of the Duchy of Milan. Condemned the doctrine of mental reservation (1679) and initiated the Holy League. Extended the Holy Name of Mary as a universal feast (1684). Admired for positive contributions to catechesis. |
| 241 | 6 October 1689 – 1 February 1691 (1 year, 118 days) | | Alexander VIII; ALEXANDER Octavus | Pietro Vito Ottoboni | 22 April 1610 Venice, Republic of Venice | 79 / 80 | Citizen of the Republic of Venice. Condemned the so-called philosophical sin (1690). |
| 242 | 12 July 1691 – 27 September 1700 (9 years, 77 days) | | Innocent XII; INNOCENTIVS Duodecimus | Antonio Pignatelli | 13 March 1615 Spinazzola, Kingdom of Naples | 76 / 85 | Subject of the Kingdom of Naples. Issued the bull Romanum decet Pontificem (1692) to stop nepotism. Erected various charitable and educational institutions. |
| 243 | 23 November 1700 – 19 March 1721 (20 years, 116 days) | | Clement XI; CLEMENS Undecimus | Giovanni Francesco Albani | 23 July 1649 Urbino, Papal States | 51 / 71 | Subject and later the sovereign of the Papal States. The Chinese Rites controversy. Patronized the first archaeological excavations in the Roman catacombs and made the feast of Immaculate Conception universal. The Inquisition's ban on the reprinting of Galileo's works was lifted in 1718, when permission was granted to publish an edition of his scientific works (excluding the condemned Dialogue) in Florence. |

==== 18th century ====
Popes of the 18th century
| Pontiff number | Pontificate | Portrait | Name: English · Latin | Personal name | Date and place of birth | Age at start/ end of papacy | Notes |
|---|---|---|---|---|---|---|---|
| 244 | 8 May 1721 – 7 March 1724 (2 years, 304 days) | | Innocent XIII; INNOCENTIVS Tertius Decimus | Michelangelo dei Conti | 13 May 1655 Poli, Papal States | 65 / 68 | Subject and later the sovereign of the Papal States. Prohibited the Jesuits from prosecuting their mission in China, ordering that no new members should be received into the order. Issued the papal bull Apostolici Ministerii (1724), reviving ecclesiastical discipline in Spain and its colonies. |
| 245 | 29 May 1724 – 21 February 1730 (5 years, 268 days) | | Servant of God Benedict XIII; BENEDICTVS Tertius Decimus | Pierfrancesco Orsini, O.P. | 2 February 1649 Gravina in Puglia, Kingdom of Naples | 75 / 81 | Subject of the Kingdom of Naples. Member of the Dominican Order, with the religious name Vincenzo. Third and last member of the Orsini family to become pope. Originally called Benedict XIV due to the antipope but reverted to XIII. Repealed the worldwide tobacco smoking ban set by Urban VII and Urban VIII. During his pontificate, James Bradley discovered the stellar aberration, proving the relative motion of the Earth in its orbit around the Sun. |
| 246 | 12 July 1730 – 6 February 1740 (9 years, 209 days) | | Clement XII; CLEMENS Duodecimus | Lorenzo Corsini | 7 April 1652 Florence, Grand Duchy of Tuscany | 78 / 87 | Motto: Dabis discernere inter malum et bonum ("You shall deign to distinguish between good and evil") Subject of the Grand Duchy of Tuscany. Commissioned the Trevi Fountain in Rome (1732). Completed the new façade of the Archbasilica of Saint John Lateran (1735). Condemned Freemasonry in In eminenti apostolatus (1738). |
| 247 | 17 August 1740 – 3 May 1758 (17 years, 259 days) | | Benedict XIV; BENEDICTVS Quartus Decimus | Prospero Lorenzo Lambertini | 31 March 1675 Bologna, Papal States | 65 / 83 | Motto: Curabuntur omnes ("All will be healed") Subject and later the sovereign of the Papal States. Reformed the education of priests and the calendar of feasts. Completed the Trevi Fountain and affirmed the teachings of Thomas Aquinas. Founded academies of art, liturgy, religion, and science. Authorized the publication of an edition of Galileo's complete scientific works, including a mildly censored version of Galileo's Dialogue. |
| 248 | 6 July 1758 – 2 February 1769 (10 years, 211 days) | | Clement XIII; CLEMENS Tertius Decimus | Carlo della Torre di Rezzonico | 7 March 1693 Venice, Republic of Venice | 65 / 75 | Citizen of the Republic of Venice. Provided the famous fig leaves on nude male statues in the Vatican. Defended the Jesuits in the bull Apostolicum pascendi (1765). During his pontificate (or at the end of his predecessor's pontificate), the general prohibition against works advocating heliocentrism was removed from the Index of Forbidden Books, although the specific ban on uncensored versions of Galileo's Dialogue and Copernicus's De Revolutionibus remained. |
| 249 | 19 May 1769 – 22 September 1774 (5 years, 126 days) | | Clement XIV; CLEMENS Quartus Decimus | Giovanni Vincenzo Antonio Ganganelli, O.F.M. Conv. | 31 October 1705 Sant'; Arcangelo di Romagna, Papal States | 63 / 68 | Subject and later the sovereign of the Papal States. Member of the Conventual Franciscan Order, with the religious name Lorenzo. Suppressed the Jesuits through the brief Dominus ac Redemptor (1773). |
| 250 | 15 February 1775 – 29 August 1799 (24 years, 195 days) | | Pius VI; PIVS Sextus | Angelo Onofrio Melchiorre Natale Giovanni Antonio Braschi | 25 December 1717 Cesena, Papal States | 57 / 81 | Motto: Floret in Domo Domini ("It blossoms in the House of God") Subject and later the sovereign of the Papal States. Condemned the French Revolution; expelled from the Papal States by the French from 1798 until his death. Last pope to be a patron of Renaissance art. |
| — | 29 August 1799 – 14 March 1800 (197 days) | | Interregnum | | | | Six-month period without a valid pope elected. This was due to unique logistical problems (the former pope died a prisoner and the conclave was in Venice) and a deadlock among cardinals voting. |
| 251 | 14 March 1800 – 20 August 1823 (23 years, 159 days) | | Servant of God Pius VII; PIVS Septimus | Barnaba Niccolò Maria Luigi Chiaramonti, O.S.B. | 14 August 1742 Cesena, Papal States | 57 / 81 | Subject and later the sovereign of the Papal States. Member of the Order of Saint Benedict, with the religious name Gregorio. Present at Napoleon's coronation as emperor of the French. Expelled from the Papal States by the French between 1809 and 1814. Revived the Jesuits in the bull Sollicitudo omnium ecclesiarum (1814). Organized the Papal Carabinieri Corps (1816). |

==== 19th century ====
Popes of the 19th century
| Pontiff number | Pontificate | Portrait | Name: English · Latin | Personal name | Date and place of birth | Age at start/ end of papacy | Notes |
|---|---|---|---|---|---|---|---|
| 252 | 28 September 1823 – 10 February 1829 (5 years, 135 days) | | Leo XII; LEO Duodecimus | Annibale Francesco Clemente Melchiorre Girolamo Nicola della Genga | 22 August 1760 Genga, Papal States | 63 / 68 | Subject and later the sovereign of the Papal States. Placed the Catholic educational system under the control of the Jesuits through the bull Quod divina sapientia (1824). Condemned Freemasonry and the Bible societies. |
| 253 | 31 March 1829 – 30 November 1830 (1 year, 244 days) | | Pius VIII; PIVS Octavus | Francesco Saverio Maria Felice Castiglioni | 20 November 1761 Cingoli, Papal States | 67 / 69 | Subject and later the sovereign of the Papal States. Accepted Louis Philippe I as king of the French. Condemned the masonic secret societies and modernist translations of the Bible through the brief Litteris altero (1830). |
| 254 | 2 February 1831 – 1 June 1846 (15 years, 119 days) | | Gregory XVI; GREGORIVS Sextus Decimus | Bartolomeo Alberto Cappellari, O.S.B. Cam. | 18 September 1765 Belluno, Republic of Venice | 65 / 80 | Citizen of the Republic of Venice. Member of the Camaldolese, with the religious name Mauro. Last non-bishop to be elected to the papacy. Politically opposed to democratic and modernising reforms of the Papal States. Regarding scientific thinking, all traces of opposition to heliocentrism by the church disappeared in 1835, when the uncensored versions of Dialogue and De Revolutionibus were finally removed from the Index. |
| 255 | 16 June 1846 – 7 February 1878 (31 years, 236 days) | | Bl. Pius IX; PIVS Nonus | Giovanni Maria Battista Pietro Pellegrino Isidoro Mastai-Ferretti | 13 May 1792 Senigallia, Papal States | 54 / 85 | Subject and later the last sovereign of the Papal States, finally becoming an Italian citizen. Defined the dogmas of Immaculate Conception and papal infallibility. Issued the controversial Syllabus of Errors (1864). Opened the First Vatican Council (1869). Lost the Papal States to Italy (1870). Longest-reigning pope since Peter (c. 30–64); longest verified reign. First pope to be photographed. During his pontificate, Augustinian friar Gregor Mendel published the "Experiments on Plant Hybridization" and Charles Darwin published On the Origin of Species. At that time, no high-level Catholic Church pronouncement attacked head-on the theory of evolution as applied to non-human species. |
| 256 | 20 February 1878 – 20 July 1903 (25 years, 150 days) | | Leo XIII; LEO Tertius Decimus | Gioacchino Vincenzo Raffaele Luigi Pecci | 2 March 1810 Carpineto Romano, French Empire | 67 / 93 | Subject of the First French Empire, later becoming a subject of the Papal States and finally an Italian citizen. Issued the encyclical Rerum novarum (1891), supporting Christian democracy against Communism. Fourth-longest reigning pope after Peter, Pius IX, and John Paul II. Promoted the rosary and scapular. Approved two new Marian scapulars; first pope to fully embrace the concept of Mary as mediatrix. First pope to be filmed using a motion picture camera (1898) and first pope with voice recorded. Longest-living verifiable pope in office. |

==== 20th century ====
Popes of the 20th century
| Pontiff number | Pontificate | Portrait | Name: English · Latin | Personal name | Date and place of birth | Age at start/ end of papacy | Notes |
|---|---|---|---|---|---|---|---|
| 257 | 4 August 1903 – 20 August 1914 (11 years, 16 days) | | St Pius X PIVS Decimus | Giuseppe Melchiorre Sarto | 2 June 1835 Riese, Kingdom of Lombardy–Venetia, Austrian Empire | 68 / 79 | Motto: Instaurare omnia in Christo ("To restore all things in Christ") Subject of the Kingdom of Lombardy–Venetia, later becoming an Italian citizen. Placed a renewed emphasis on the Eucharist, expanding its reception. Combatted Modernism, issuing an oath against it (1910). Advocated the use of Gregorian Chant and reformed the Roman Breviary (1911). |
| 258 | 3 September 1914 – 22 January 1922 (7 years, 141 days) | | Benedict XV; BENEDICTVS Quintus Decimus | Giacomo Paolo Giovanni Battista della Chiesa | 21 November 1854 Pegli, Kingdom of Sardinia | 59 / 67 | Motto: In Te, Domine, speravi; non confundar in aeternum ("In Thee, o Lord, have I trusted; let me not be confounded for evermore") Subject of the Kingdom of Sardinia, later becoming an Italian citizen. Credited for intervening for peace during World War I. Issued the 1917 Code of Canon Law; supported the missionaries in Maximum illud. Remembered by Benedict XVI as a "prophet of peace". Reversed the betting ban on the outcome of papal elections imposed by Gregory XIV. |
| 259 | 6 February 1922 – 10 February 1939 (17 years, 4 days) | | Pius XI; PIVS Undecimus | Ambrogio Damiano Achille Ratti | 31 May 1857 Desio, Kingdom of Lombardy–Venetia, Austrian Empire | 64 / 81 | Motto: Pax Christi in Regno Christi ("The Peace of Christ in the Kingdom of Christ") Subject of the Kingdom of Lombardy–Venetia, later becoming an Italian citizen. Signed the Lateran Treaty with Italy (1929), establishing Vatican City as a sovereign state. Inaugurated the Vatican Radio (1931). Refounded the Pontifical Academy of Sciences (1936). Instituted the feast of Christ the King. Opposed Nazism and Communism. During his pontificate, Catholic priest and physicist Georges Lemaître proposed what he called the "hypothesis of the primeval atom", now regarded as the first formulation of the Big Bang theory of the origin of the universe. |
| 260 | 2 March 1939 – 9 October 1958 (19 years, 221 days) | | Ven. Pius XII; PIVS Duodecimus | Eugenio Maria Giuseppe Giovanni Pacelli | 2 March 1876 Rome, Kingdom of Italy | 63 / 82 | Motto: Opus justitiae pax ("The work of justice [shall be] peace") Italian citizen; first pope born after the unification of Italy. Credited with intervening for peace during World War II; controversial for his reactions to the Holocaust. Invoked papal infallibility in the apostolic constitution Munificentissimus Deus, defining the dogma of the Assumption. Published the Humani generis (1950), the first encyclical to specifically refer to evolution and take a neutral position in regard to human evolution. |
| 261 | 28 October 1958 – 3 June 1963 (4 years, 218 days) | | St John XXIII; IOANNES Vicesimus Tertius | Angelo Giuseppe Roncalli | 25 November 1881 Sotto il Monte, Kingdom of Italy | 76 / 81 | Motto: Obedientia et pax ("Obedience and peace") Italian citizen. Opened the Second Vatican Council (1962). Intervened for peace during the Cuban Missile Crisis (1962); issued the encyclical Pacem in terris (1963) on peace and nuclear disarmament. Called the "Good Pope John". |
| 262 | 21 June 1963 – 6 August 1978 (15 years, 46 days) | | St Paul VI; PAVLVS Sextus | Giovanni Battista Enrico Antonio Maria Montini | 26 September 1897 Concesio, Kingdom of Italy | 65 / 80 | Motto: Cum Ipso in monte ("With Him on the [holy] mountain"); In nomine Domini ("In the name of the Lord"); Italian citizen. Last pope to be crowned. First pope since 1809 to travel outside Italy. Closed the Second Vatican Council (1965). First pope since the 9th century to visit the East, labelling the Eastern Churches as sister churches; visited the Eastern Orthodox Patriarchs of Jerusalem and Constantinople in 1964 and 1967. Rescinded the mutual excommunications which led to the Great Schism of 1054 in his meeting with Patriarch Athenagoras I in 1964. Issued the encyclical Humanae vitae (1968), reaffirming the condemnation of artificial contraception. Revised the Roman Missal (1969). |
| 263 | 26 August 1978 – 28 September 1978 (33 days) | | Bl. John Paul I IOANNES PAVLVS Primus | Albino Luciani | 17 October 1912 Forno di Canale, Kingdom of Italy | 65 / 65 | Motto: Humilitas ("Humility") Italian citizen; most recent Italian pope. First pope to be born in the twentieth century. Abolished the papal coronation and opted for the papal inauguration. First pope to use "the First" in his papal name; first with two names for his two immediate predecessors. Last to use the sedia gestatoria. Died 33 days after his election. |
| 264 | 16 October 1978 – 2 April 2005 (26 years, 168 days) | | St John Paul II; IOANNES PAVLVS Secundus | Karol Józef Wojtyła | 18 May 1920 Wadowice, Republic of Poland | 58 / 84 | Motto: Totus tuus ("Totally yours") Polish citizen; first pope from Poland and first of Slavic origin. First non-Italian pope since Adrian VI (1522–1523). Youngest individual to begin his papacy since Pius IX (1846). Third-longest reigning pope after Peter and Pius IX. Travelled extensively, visiting 129 countries during his pontificate. Issued the encyclical Redemptor hominis (1979), exploring contemporary human problems. Promoted the culture of life. Established the World Youth Day (1984) and the Pontifical Academy of Social Sciences (1994). Canonized 483 saints, more than any of his predecessors. Signed the Joint Declaration on the Doctrine of Justification (1999) between the Catholic Church and the Lutheran World Federation. First to use the popemobile, replacing the sedia gestatoria. |

=== 3rd millennium ===
==== 21st century ====
Popes of the 21st century
| Pontiff number | Pontificate | Portrait | Name: English · Latin | Personal name | Date and place of birth | Age at start/ end of papacy | Notes |
|---|---|---|---|---|---|---|---|
| 265 | 19 April 2005 – 28 February 2013 (7 years, 315 days) | | Benedict XVI; BENEDICTVS Sextus Decimus | Joseph Alois Ratzinger | 16 April 1927 Marktl, Bavaria, German Reich | 78 / 85 (†95) | Motto: Cooperatores veritatis ("Cooperators of the truth") German citizen; first German pope since Stephen IX (1057–1058). Removed the papal tiara from the coat of arms. Promoted the use of Latin and reintroduced several papal garments that had fallen into disuse. Elevated the Tridentine Mass to a more prominent position (2007). Authorized the formation of the Anglican ordinariates (2009). Issued the encyclical Caritas in veritate (2009), calling for a rethinking of global economy. First pope to renounce the papacy since Gregory XII (1415); the first to do so on his own initiative since Celestine V (1294), becoming pope emeritus. Died on 31 December 2022, aged 95; longest-lived verifiable pope on record. |
| 266 | 13 March 2013 – 21 April 2025 (12 years, 39 days) | | Francis; FRANCISCVS | Jorge Mario Bergoglio, S.J. | 17 December 1936 Buenos Aires, Argentina | 76 / 88 | Motto: Miserando atque eligendo ("By having mercy and by choosing") Argentine citizen of Italian descent. First pope born outside Europe since Gregory III (731–741) and the first from the Americas; first pope from Argentina, first from South America and the first from the Southern Hemisphere. First pope from a religious institute since Gregory XVI (1831–1846); first Jesuit pope. First pope to use a new and non-composed papal name since Lando (913–914). Issued the encyclical Laudato si' (2015), condemning global warming and irresponsible economic development. Facilitated the Cuban thaw (2015–2017). Nominations to the College of Cardinals resulted in a non-European majority. First pope to visit and celebrate Mass on the Arabian Peninsula. Restricted the Tridentine Mass (2021). Convoked the Synod on Synodality (2022). Second-longest lived verifiable pope in office after Leo XIII. |
| 267 | 8 May 2025 – present (1 year, 189 days) | | Leo XIV; LEO Quartus Decimus | Robert Francis Prevost, O.S.A. | 14 September 1955 Chicago, Illinois, United States of America | 69 | Motto: In illo Uno unum ("In the One, we are one") Dual American and Peruvian citizen of French, Italian, Spanish and Louisiana Creole descent; first pope born in the United States, first from North America, and the second from the Americas. Second pope from an English-speaking country; the first since Adrian IV (1154–1159). First pope to be born after World War II and during the Cold War. First Augustinian pope. Issued the encyclical Magnifica humanitas, on preserving the human person in the era of artificial intelligence. Excommunicated the Society of Saint Pius X following their unauthorised consecrations (2026). First pope to vote in secular elections. |

== Religious orders ==
Fifty-one popes and six antipopes (in italics) have been members of religious orders, including 12 members of third orders. They are listed by order as follows:

| Type | # | Family | # | Order | # | Popes |
|---|---|---|---|---|---|---|
| Canons Regular | 6 | Augustinian; Canons (C.R.S.A.) | 5 | Canons of the Lateran (C.R.L.) | 2 | Honorius II, Innocent II |
| Canons Regular | 6 | Augustinian; Canons (C.R.S.A.) | 5 | Canons of San Frediano | 1 | Lucius II |
| Canons Regular | 6 | Augustinian; Canons (C.R.S.A.) | 5 | Canons of Saint-Ruf | 1 | Adrian IV |
| Canons Regular | 6 | Augustinian; Canons (C.R.S.A.) | 5 | Canons of San Giorgio in Alga | 1 | Eugene IV |
| Canons Regular | 6 | Premonstratensians (O.Praem.) | | | 1 | Gregory VIII |
| Monastic Orders | 25 | Benedictine Orders | 23 | Benedictines (O.S.B.) | 22 | Gregory I, Boniface IV, Adeodatus II, Leo IV, John IX, Leo VII, John XVI, Sylvester II, Sergius IV, Stephen IX, Gregory VII, Victor III, Urban II, Paschal II, Adalbert, Gelasius II, Anacletus II, Callixtus III, Celestine V, Clement VI, Urban V, Pius VII |
| Monastic Orders | 25 | Benedictine Orders | 23 | Benedictine Camaldolese (O.S.B.Cam.) | 1 | Gregory XVI |
| Monastic Orders | 25 | Cistercians (O.Cist.) | | | 2 | Eugene III, Benedict XII |
| Mendicant Orders | 24 | Augustinians (O.S.A.) | | | 1 | Leo XIV |
| Mendicant Orders | 24 | Dominican Orders | 5 | Dominicans (O.P.) | 4 | Innocent V, Benedict XI, Pius V, Benedict XIII |
| Mendicant Orders | 24 | Dominican Orders | 5 | Dominican Tertiary (T.O.P.) | 1 | Benedict XV |
| Mendicant Orders | 24 | Franciscan Orders | 18 | Friars Minor (O.F.M.) | 5 | Nicholas IV, Nicholas V, Alexander V, Sixtus IV, Julius II |
| Mendicant Orders | 24 | Franciscan Orders | 18 | Conventual Franciscans (O.F.M.Conv.) | 2 | Sixtus V, Clement XIV |
| Mendicant Orders | 24 | Franciscan Orders | 18 | Secular Franciscans (O.F.S.) | 11 | Gregory IX, Gregory X, Martin V, Innocent XII, Clement XII, Pius IX, Leo XIII, Pius X, Pius XI, Pius XII, John XXIII |
| Clerics Regular | 2 | Jesuits (S.J.) | | | 1 | Francis |
| Clerics Regular | 2 | Theatines (C.R.) | | | 1 | Paul IV |
| Total | 57 | N/A | | | 57 | N/A |

== Numbering of popes ==
Regnal numbers follow the usual convention for European monarchs. Antipopes are treated as pretenders, and their numbers are reused by those considered to be legitimate popes. However, there are anomalies in the numbering of the popes. Several numbers were mistakenly increased in the Middle Ages because the records were misunderstood. Several antipopes were also kept in the sequence, either by mistake or because they were previously considered to be true popes. The first pope who chooses a unique name is identified by the ordinal I, as John Paul I did in 1978. Francis is an exception to this, having personally explicitly decided not to use a number. All earlier popes who do not share their name with any later pope reigned before regnal numbers became a common practice and therefore cannot be seen as precedents, especially since they are all sometimes referred to as "the first".

- Alexander: Antipope Alexander V (1409–1410) was listed in the Annuario Pontificio as a legitimate pope until the 20th century, when the Pisan popes were reclassified as antipopes. There had already been three more Alexanders by then, so there is now a gap in the numbering sequence.
- Benedict: Antipope Benedict X (1058–1059) was kept in the numbering sequence.
- Boniface: Antipope Boniface VII (974 and 984–985) was kept in the numbering sequence.
- Donus: The name has only been used by one pope. The apocryphal Pope Donus II resulted from confusion between the Latin word dominus (lord) and the name Donus.
- Felix: Antipope Felix II (356–357) was kept in the numbering sequence.
- John: The numbering of the Popes John is particularly confused. In the modern sequence, they are identified by the numbers they used during their reigns.
  - Antipope John XVI (997–998) was kept in the numbering sequence.
  - Pope John XXI (1276–1277) chose to skip the number XX, believing that there had been another Pope John between XIV and XV. In reality, John XIV had been counted twice.
  - By the 16th century, the numbering error had been conflated with legends about a female Pope Joan, whom some authors called John VIII. She was never listed in the Annuario Pontificio.
  - Antipope John XXIII (1410–1415) was listed in the Annuario Pontificio as a legitimate pope until the 20th century. After the Pisan popes were classified as antipopes, Pope John XXIII (1958–1963) chose to reuse the number, citing "twenty-two [sic] Johns of indisputable legitimacy".
- Martin: Pope Martin I (649–653/4) is followed by Martin IV (1281–1285). Due to the similarity between the Latin names Marinus and Martinus, Marinus I and Marinus II were mistakenly considered to be Martin II and III.
- Stephen: Pope-elect Stephen (752) died before being consecrated. He was previously known as Stephen II, but the Vatican removed him from the official list of popes in 1961. The remaining Stephens are now numbered Pope Stephen II (752–757) to Pope Stephen IX (1057–1058).

== See also ==
- Annuario Pontificio
- History of the papacy
- Index of Vatican City-related articles
- Legends surrounding the papacy
- Liber Pontificalis
- Papal conclave
- Papal name
- Pope John numbering
- Prophecy of the Popes

=== Lists ===
- List of canonized popes
- List of popes (graphical)
- List of popes by country
- List of popes from the Borgia family
- List of popes from the Conti family
- List of popes from the Medici family
- List of popes of the Coptic Orthodox Church
- List of popes who died violently
- List of sexually active popes
