= Mastai family =

Italian noble family

Coat of arms of Pope Pius IX

The Mastai family was a noble Italian family known as one of the oldest and most powerful ones, which counts among its members multiple clergymen as well as a pope.

== From Crema to Senigallia ==
The history of the Mastais, who were originally entrepreneurs and merchants, began in Lombardia, probably to Crema or Brescia, where its founder Francesco Mastai was born in 1520. Then Federico, who moved from Crema to Venice, married the young lady Santa, with whom he had two kids, Pompeo e Giovanni Mastai, giving birth to the dynasty. Then the family moved to Senigallia, where the Fiera Franca began to attract every kind of merchants.

== Giovanni Maria I ==
Here Giovanni Maria Mastai married Caterina di Claudio Garimboldi, who brought in dowry some land and the fourteenth-century palace where they established in 1579, since then known as Mastai Palace. The wellness came with the ability of Mastai brothers in affairs making the family one of the most important Italian families and Giovanni even became a senator. Only nobles could accede to that charge. Unfortunately, Pompeo's branch soon came to an end. Between Giovanni and Caterina's eleven kids just six survived: Leonilde and Agnese, that entered in the convent, Porzia and Camilla, that married Beliardi and Fagnani, Andrea who became archpriest of the chapter and apostolic prothonotary, while Francesco continued the lineage. He married Benedetta Bruni and had three children: Giovanni Battista, who entered the clergy, Agnese, that married Alessandro Mariotti from Fano and Giovanni Maria, who became a merchant.

== Giovanni Maria Mastai II ==
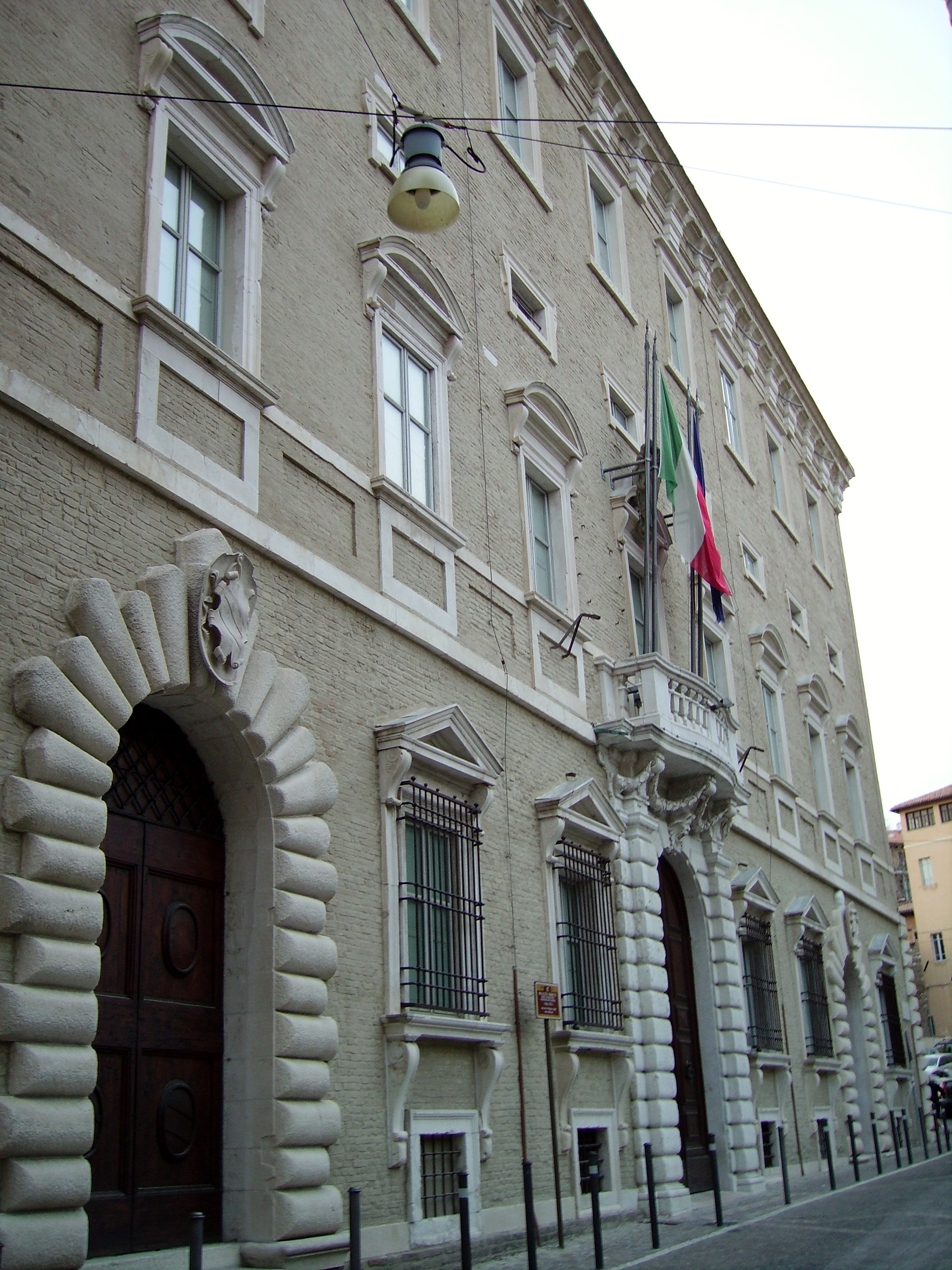
Palace Ferretti, 16th century family of the Ferretis from Ancona, since 1958 it has been the headquarters of the National Archaeological Museum of the Marche

Giovanni Maria Mastai II (1625-1688) entered, as well as his ancestors, in Senigallia municipal council, which at the time returned under the Papal State, and was gonfalonier several times. after the death of his wife, Eleonora Benedetti, he married on 9 September 1653 the countess Margherita Minerva Ferretti from Ancona in second marriage, marry into a line of high lineage. Six years later Margaret, after her brother's death on 12 December 1659, inherited the palace in Ancona, some property in Castelferretti and the title of count for her children. Since then, according to the testament, their descendants call themselves ‘Mastai Ferretti counts’. Of their children the firstborn Francesco Filippo (1647-1688) entered the clergy, becoming advisor of the Holy Office, while the fortunes of the family were managed by the other two sons: Antonio Maria Andrea (1656-1732) and Gerolamo (1659-1713). The first one who was commonly known as “Abbot Andrew”, remained unmarried, he became the head of the family and started living with his brother in Avito palace that he decorated to make it more suited to the increased wellness of the family. To do that he asked Giovanni Anastasi from Senigallia, a paint at the end of 1600 biblical scenes, to paint walls and woodworks. Gerolamo has been gonfalonier several times and married Felicita Maria de Rossi from Montaboldo, with whom he had nineteen kids. Among the survivors, five became monks and the others, except for the firstborn Giovanni Maria, who continued the line, entered the clergy.

== Giovanni Maria Mastai III ==
Giovanni Maria III, born in 1687 as Antonio Maria was sent by his father and uncle to Francesco Farnese Duke of Parma's court, where he was page for six years, obtaining the degree of count and the title of lord of the chamber. Giovanni married Maria Isabella daughter of Ercole Maria Ercolani, marquis of Fornovo and Rocca Lanzona, with whom he had six children and who died in 1738. After the death of his wife, Giovanni became a cleric and dedicated himself to the passing of the local history by copying manuscripts and by writing some himself. Among his children Margherita became a nun, Maria Benedetta married Guido Consalvi from Macerata, Anna Maria Tommasa married Francesco Boni who was, like her, noble origin Ercole had nine children woman Caterina Guglielmini Balleani, a noble from Jesi, continuing the lineage. Of Ercole's children Andrea became the bishop of Pesaro in 1806, Gabriele was canon in Senigallia and Paolino in Rome. The firstborn Gerolamo married Caterina Solazzi in 1780 and been gonfalonier multiple times and a member of the R. Cesareo Magistrato. His son Giovanni Maria will become Pope Pius IX.

== Habemus papam: Giovanni Maria Mastai IV ==
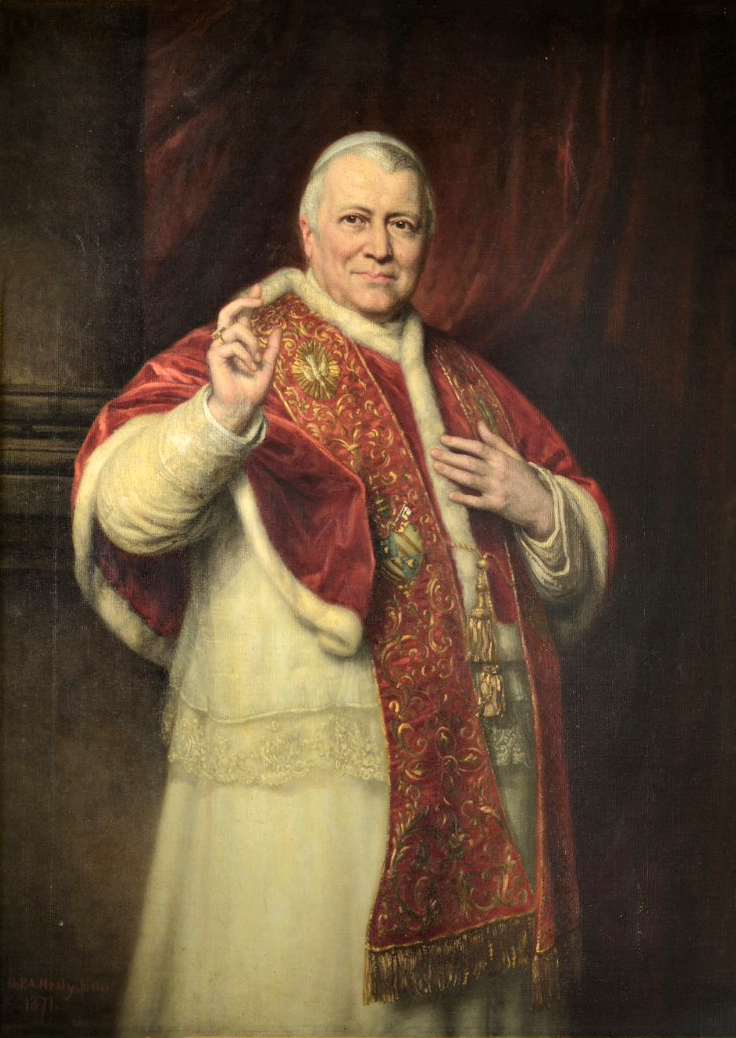
Portrait of Pius IX by George Peter Alexander Healy (1871)

In 1792, the year of birth of the fourth Giovanni Maria, the Mastai family was judged "quite noble and wealthy for those countries". This is how the Democrat Ferdinando Petruccelli della Gattina summarized its history in 1861:

The Mastai family was aggressive and always active in civil discord; ready for espionage if there were opportunities. The Mastai family began to have great importance in the city. The marriage of Giovanni Maria Mastai with a girl from the Ferretti family from Ancona was added to this, having a great heritage. So the Mastai-Ferretti family rose in the province.

The social ascent had not stopped, since the peak of fame came for the Mastai-Ferretti thanks to the cadet branch that distinguished itself in the ecclesiastical sphere.

Even in this sector, many Mastai had already obtained titles and awards, much so that the fourth Giovanni Maria could count 3 uncles "Monsignors", including the bishop of Pesaro. Appointed priest in 1819, in 1827 he became archbishop of Spoleto, to which he added, after 5 years, the title of bishop of Imola and in 1840 the purple cardinal. The conclave of 1846 acclaimed him pope with the name of Pius IX and his pontificate was among the longest in the history of the Catholic Church.

The mentioned "progressive" tendencies were not lacking in the family of the Counts Mastai-Ferretti even in the nineteenth century. Pius IX himself, despite his controversial judgment on his figure, was often referred to as a "liberal" pope.

On 3 September 2000, Giovanni Maria Mastai-Ferretti was proclaimed blessed by Pope John Paul II. Senigallia preserves its memory with the Spirituality Culture Center in Palazzo Mastai Ferretti (where there is also a library of over thirty thousand volumes and the Pius IX Museum) and with the Opera Pia Mastai Ferretti, which houses about 200 elderly people.

== Genealogical tree ==
1. Francesco Mastai (Crema 1520), wife (ca. 1540) the Venetian saint from whom he has:
  1. Pompeo Mastai
  2. Giovanni Maria Mastai (Venice 1557 - Senigallia 1624), bride (1579 ca.) Caterina Gariboldi from whom she has
    1. Leonilde Mastai
    2. Agnese Mastai
    3. Porzia Mastai, married Beliardi
    4. Camilla Mastai, married Fagnani
    5. Andrea Mastai, archpriest
    6. Francesco Mastai (Senigallia 1588), wife Benedetta Bruni from whom she has:
      1. Giovanni Battista Mastai, ecclesiastic
      2. Agnese Mastai, married to Alessandro Mariotti
      3. Giovanni Maria Mastai (Senigallia 1625-1688), married Eleonora Benedetti for the first time and in second marriage (9 September 1653) Countess Margherita Minerva Ferretti (20 July 1626 -), from whom she has:
        1. Francesco Filippo Mastai (Senigallia 1647-1688), ecclesiastical
        2. Benedetta Mastai, married Forestieri
        3. Antonio Maria Andrea Mastai-Ferretti (Senigallia 1656-1732), known as Abbot Andrea
        4. Count Gerolamo Mastai-Ferretti (Senigallia 1659-1713), married Felicita Maria Rossi of Moltalboddo from whom she had:
          1. Count (Antonio) Giovanni Maria Mastai-Ferretti (Senigallia 1687-1760), marries the Marquise Maria Isabella Ercolani from whom she has:
            1. Margherita Mastai-Ferretti
            2. Maria Benedetta Mastai-Ferretti, married with Guido Consalvi
            3. Anna Maria Tommasa Mastai-Ferretti, married with Francesco Boni
            4. Count Ercole Mastai-Ferretti (Senigallia 1727-1818), married Caterina Guglielmi Ballerani from whom she had:
              1. Count Gerolamo Mastai-Ferretti (Senigallia 1750-1833), wife (1780) Caterina Solazzi from whom she has:
              2. Count Gabriele Mastai-Ferretti, marries the Countess Virginia Augusti, from whom he has:
                1. Count Luigi Mastai-Ferretti, from whom he has:
                  1. Cristina Mastai-Ferretti, married to the Bellegarde de Saint Lary
                  2. Gaetano Mastai-Ferretti
                  3. Giuseppe Mastai-Ferretti
                  4. Mastai-Ferretti, married to Giraldi Della Rovere
                  5. Giovanni Maria Mastai-Ferretti (Senigallia May 13, 1792 - Rome February 7, 1878), Pope Pius IX
                  6. Andrea Mastai-Ferretti (Senigallia 17 .. - Pesaro 1822), bishop of Pesaro from 1806
                  7. Angelo Gabriele Mastai-Ferretti, canon
                  8. Paolino Mastai-Ferretti, canon in Santa Maria Maggiore in Rome
