= Breakspeare =

Breakspeare (alternatively Breakspear) is a surname. It may refer to:

== Breakspeare ==
- Boso Breakspeare (died 1178), Italian Cardinal
- Cindy Breakspeare (born 1954), Jamaican jazz musician and former model
- William Breakspeare (1855–1914), English artist

== Breakspear ==
- Breakspear, pen name of William Lysander Adams (1821–1906), American writer and newspaper editor in Oregon, later a doctor
- Nicholas Breakspear, birth name of Pope Adrian IV (c. 1100–1159), the only English Pope

== See also ==
- Nicholas Breakspear School, English secondary school with academy status situated near St Albans
