= List of popes from the Conti family =

The list of popes from the Conti family includes five names.

== History ==
The Conti di Segni (de Comitibus Signie, also known as Conti or De Comitibus for short) were an important noble family of medieval and early modern Italy originating in Segni, Lazio. Many members of the family acted as military commanders or ecclesiastical dignitaries, including many cardinals and four popes.

During the Middle Ages, the Conti were notable, including four who became popes:

- Pope Innocent III (1160 or 1161 – 16 July 1216), born Lotario de' Conti, was the head of the Catholic Church from 8 January 1198 to his death in 1216.
- Pope Gregory IX (1227–1241), born Ugolino di Conti
- Pope Alexander IV (1254–1261), born Rinaldo di Conti
- Pope Innocent XIII (1721–1724), born Michelangelo di Conti

See also:

- Antipope Victor IV (1138), born Gregorio di Conti

== Related pages ==
- Papal name
