= 1046 =

1046 in various calendars
- Gregorian calendar: 1046; MXLVI
- Ab urbe condita: 1799
- Armenian calendar: 495; ԹՎ ՆՂԵ
- Assyrian calendar: 5796
- Balinese saka calendar: 967–968
- Bengali calendar: 452–453
- Berber calendar: 1996
- English Regnal year: N/A
- Buddhist calendar: 1590
- Burmese calendar: 408
- Byzantine calendar: 6554–6555
- Chinese calendar: 乙酉年 (Wood Rooster); 3743 or 3536 — to — 丙戌年 (Fire Dog); 3744 or 3537
- Coptic calendar: 762–763
- Discordian calendar: 2212
- Ethiopian calendar: 1038–1039
- Hebrew calendar: 4806–4807
- Hindu calendars
- Vikram Samvat: 1102–1103
- Shaka Samvat: 967–968
- Kali Yuga: 4146–4147
- Holocene calendar: 11046
- Igbo calendar: 46–47
- Iranian calendar: 424–425
- Islamic calendar: 437–438
- Japanese calendar: Kantoku 3 / Eishō 1 (永承元年)
- Javanese calendar: 949–950
- Julian calendar: 1046; MXLVI
- Korean calendar: 3379
- Minguo calendar: 866 before ROC 民前866年
- Nanakshahi calendar: −422
- Seleucid era: 1357/1358 AG
- Thai solar calendar: 1588–1589
- Tibetan calendar: ཤིང་མོ་བྱ་ལོ་ (female Wood-Bird); 1172 or 791 or 19 — to — མེ་ཕོ་ཁྱི་ལོ་ (male Fire-Dog); 1173 or 792 or 20

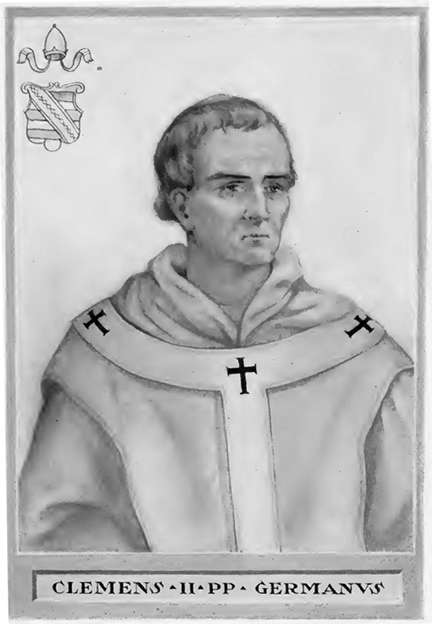
Pope Clement II (r. 1046–1047)

Year 1046 (MXLVI) was a common year starting on Wednesday of the Julian calendar.

== Events ==
=== By place ===
==== Europe ====
- Autumn – King Henry III ("the Black") travels to Italy to secure the imposition of Guido da Velate, archbishop of Milan, and other similarly loyal candidates in other sees (like Ravenna, Verona and Modena).
- Vata pagan uprising in the Kingdom of Hungary: Peter, King of Hungary ("the Venetian"), is overthrown after a 2-year reign and perhaps executed. Bishops Gerard of Csanád and Bystrík (or Bestricus) are stoned to death in Budapest.

==== Britain ====
- Ealdred, bishop of Worcester, leads troops from England on an unsuccessful punitive raid against the Welsh leaders Gruffydd ap Rhydderch, Rhys ap Rhydderch and Gruffydd ap Llywelyn.

==== Asia ====
- Bao Zheng (Lord Bao), a Chinese government officer during the reign of Emperor Renzong of Song, writes a memorial to the throne. He warns about governmental corruption – and a foreseeable bankruptcy of the Chinese iron industry – if increasingly poorer families continued to be listed on the register for iron-smelting households (while rich households avoid being listed for fear of financial calamity). Apparently the government heeds the warning, and produces more iron products by the year 1078 than China ever had before.
- Munjong is crowned the 11th king of Goryeo (Korea).

=== By topic ===
==== Exploration ====
- March 5 – Nasir Khusraw begins his 7-year Middle Eastern (19,000-kilometre) journey, which he later describes in the book Safarnāmé.

==== Religion ====
- Summer – Ex-Pope Benedict IX gives up a renewed attempt to reclaim the papal throne in Rome; Sylvester III reasserts his claim.
- December 20 – Pope Gregory VI is accused of simony at the Council of Sutri, and abdicates as pope of the Catholic Church.
- December 25 – Pope Clement II succeeds Gregory VI as the 149th pope, and crowns Henry III as Holy Roman Emperor.
- Hildesheim Cathedral (Germany) is largely destroyed by fire.

== Births ==
- May 8 – Constance of Burgundy, queen consort of Castile and León (d. 1093)
- Afridun I ("the Martyr"), ruler (shah) of Shirvan (d. 1120)
- Bernard of Thiron, founder of the Tironensian Order (d. 1117)
- Ingegerd, queen of Denmark and Sweden (approximate date)
- Leo of Ostia ("Marsicanus"), Italian cardinal (d. 1115)
- Masud Sa'd Salman, Persian poet and writer (d. 1121)
- Matilda, margravine of Tuscany (d. 1115) (approximate date)

== Deaths ==
- January 24 – Eckard II, Margrave of Meissen (or Ekkehard), German nobleman (b. 985)
- February 26 – Fujiwara no Sanesuke, Japanese nobleman (b. 957)
- March – Lyfing of Winchester, English abbot and bishop
- June 24 – Jeongjong II, king of Goryeo (b. 1018)
- July 18 – Elijah, bishop of Beth Nuhadra (b. 975)
- September 24 – Gerard of Csanád, Hungarian missionary bishop, killed
- September 27 – Bystrík (or Bestricus), Hungarian bishop, killed
- Art Uallach Ua Ruairc, Irish king of Connacht
- Eido II (or Egidius), bishop of Meissen (or 1045)
- Geoffrey II, count of Gâtinais (approximate date)
- Gothelo II, duke of Lower Lorraine (b. 1008)
- Oliba, Spanish count, abbot and bishop
- Richard of Verdun, French abbot (b. 970)
- William Iron Arm, Norman nobleman
