= Tusculan Papacy =

Period of papal history from 1012 to 1048

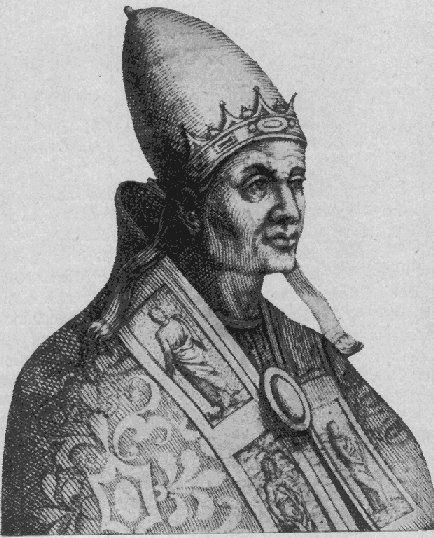
Pope Benedict VIII (1012-1024)

The Tusculan Papacy was a period of papal history from 1012 to 1048 where three successive relatives of the counts of Tusculum were installed as pope.

== Background ==
Count Theophylact I of Tusculum, his wife Theodora, and daughter Marozia held great sway over the appointment of popes from 904 to 964. The lovers of Theodora and Marozia, as well as the son and grandson of Marozia, rose to the papacy during this period. However, a Count of Tusculum had not yet attempted to appoint himself as pope until 1012. Their rivals, the Crescentii had taken over the papacy from 974 to 1012.

According to Cushing, "in many ways, increasing respect for papal authority from the mid-tenth century to mid-eleventh centuries can be best viewed through the spectrum of two Roman families: the Crescentians and the Tusculans, whose control of the papacy would have important ramifications for both the control and direction of reform." Both the Crescentii and the Counts of Tusculum were descended from Theophylact I, the former papal vestararius. The Crescentii had cooperated with German empress Theophanu and Otto III, Holy Roman Emperor, who resided in Rome from 999 to 1001.

The Tusculans did not expropriate church property to increase the already substantial holdings of their family; in fact, they appear to have expended their own resources to increase the power of the papacy. According to Luscombe and Riley-Smith, "in contrast to the Crescentians, who had largely relied on the entrenchment of their own dynasty and their supporters in the duchy of Rome as secular magnates and landowners – often at the expense of the temporal power of the Roman church – the Tusculans used their secular power and successes to shore up the standing of the papacy among the Roman nobility. The position of Patrician, so important to Crescentian rule, remained vacant."

Abbot Odilo of Cluny flourished during this period, receiving support from Benedict VII and John XIX for monastic immunity. The power of the Tusculan popes derived both from their assertions of papal supremacy and from their ability to balance power between the competing families of Rome.

The Counts of Tusculum were centered at Tuscolo, above Frascati, protected by an ancient fortress in Borghetto; their principal monasteries were Grottaferrata and Subiaco; they also controlled many churches and religious houses in and around Rome.

== History ==
=== Benedict VIII ===
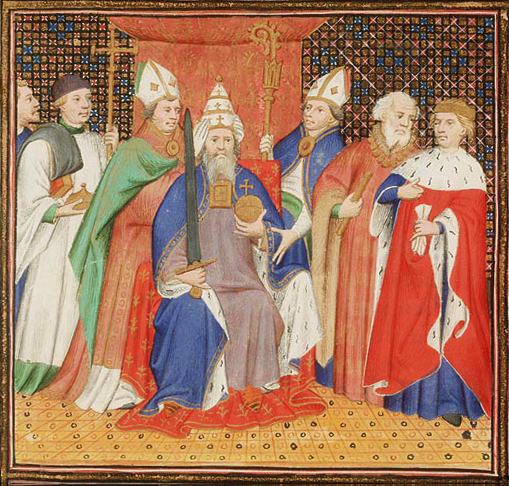
Benedict VIII crowns Emperor Henry II, as imagined in the 15th century

In 1012, Rome saw a violent political upheaval which ended Crescentii domination and elevated Theophylact, the son of Count Gregory I of Tusculum, as Pope Benedict VIII (1012–1024). Benedict VIII was a layman until his election. However, during his papacy he was a strong proponent of papal supremacy and frequently interfered in ecclesiastical matters on the Italian peninsula outside Rome. Benedict VIII's brother, Romanus, was the city prefect ("Senator of all the Romans"). His other brother, Alberic, was a Consul and Senator ("consul et dux"). Alberic was responsible for overseeing courts of justice in the Imperial Palatinate, near Santa Sabina.

Gregory I had been a figure in the court of Emperor Otto III as the "naval prefect" and Alberic had been the "master of the imperial palace". Other Roman families still held important offices: the Stefaniani family held the prefecture of Rome and the Ottaviani retained the rectorate of Sabina.

Among Benedict VIII's first acts as pope was a military campaign against the strongholds of the Crescentii around Rome. The Crescenzi fortresses in Sabina were demolished. The Crescentii faction set up a rival to Benedict VIII: Antipope Gregory VI (1012). John II Crescentius still remained the Prefect of Rome, but was soon dispossessed of much of his property.

Benedict VIII was an ally of Emperor Henry II; he called upon the emperor to visit Rome, which he did in late 1013 (spending Christmas in Pavia). A synod convoked by the emperor deposed the archbishop of Ravenna, who was replaced with Arnulf, a half-brother. Benedict VIII and the emperor met in Ravenna, and then proceeded to Rome (with the emperor arriving later).

Benedict VIII confirmed his privileges at Bamberg and crowned him on February 14, 1014 as emperor, in a ceremony in Old Saint Peter's Basilica. These twelve people calling themselves the Senate of Rome had doubtlessly consented to the coronation before it occurred. Benedict VIII visited Henry II in Bamberg in 1020 (where he celebrated Easter), and the emperor came to Italy the following year. In Bamberg, Henry issued the Henricianum, which repeated the Diploma Ottonianum, which itself had repeated donations of land which date back to the Frankish Papacy. The Henricianum, as much as the forged "Donation of Constantine", played a central role in papal territorial and sovereignty claims in the coming centuries.

Just as Henry II was promising the pope this territory, the pope was being deprived of nearly all of his temporal power by the armies of John Patricius, and competing hereditary counts had "sprung up on both sides of the Tiber". While the Tusculans remained strong in the Latin mountains, the Counts of Segni controlled Campagna, the Crescentii held Sabina, the Counts of Galeria controlled Tuscany, and Thrasmundus, Berardus, and Oderisius retained the Marsian territory as far as Subiaco. According to Gregorovius, "of the dominions founded for them by the Carolingians the popes possessed little beyond the yellowed deeds of gift in their archives".

In 1016, a Pisan and Genoese fleet defeated the Arabs, in a victory which Benedict VIII may have something to do with; he also possibly schemed with the Normans against the Byzantines in southern Italy. Benedict VIII himself led an allied force against Mussetus, who escaped after the battle of Luni. However, in 1018, Melo, the leader of the rebellion against the Greeks was defeated. The Germans honored the Henricianum in 1022 by sending their own army to southern Italy.

In 1022, Benedict VIII held with Henry II a council in Ravenna which issued stringent prohibitions against clerical concubinage.

=== John XIX ===
Benedict VIII's brother Romanus succeeded him as Pope John XIX (1024–1032). John XIX did not resign his secular titles ("senatorial dignity") upon his election as pope; documents would refer to him not as "Senator" but as "Count Palatine and Consul". According to Cushing, John XIX was "somewhat less adept" than his brother in cooperating with Henry II's successor, Conrad II, Holy Roman Emperor but was "by no means a puppet".

John XIX was open to rapprochement with Byzantine emperor Basil II and was willing to declare the patriarch of Constantinople an ecumenical bishop; the Italian bishops and congregation of Cluny, however, opposed such moves.

=== Benedict IX ===
Pope Benedict IX (1032–1044, 1045, 1047–1048) was the nephew of Benedict VIII and John XIX. Norwood Young calls Benedict IX the "Nero of the Tusculan Papacy. Absolute power appears to paralyse the brain if applied at an early age." According to Cushing, "the report of [his] crimes and deviance became ever more squalid as the latter reformers grew in power" but was for the first 12 years of his papacy "adequate and credible, if not perhaps immensely pious". Another interpretation of his first twelve years is provided by successor Victor III:

Leading a life so shameful, so foul, so execrable that he shuddered to describe it. He ruled like a captain of banditti, rather than a prelate. Adulteries, homicides perpetrated by his own hand, passed unnoticed, unrevenged; for the patrician of the city, Gregory, was the brother of the Pope; and another brother, Peter, an active partisan ... The oppressed people at length grew weary of his robberies, murders, and abominations. They rose and drove him from the city, and proceeded to the election of John Bishop of Sabina, who took the name Silvester III.

By Autumn 1044, the position of Benedict IX was "seriously threatened" by the creation of Pope Sylvester III (1045). In May 1045, Benedict IX resigned the papacy in favor of John Gratian, who became Pope Gregory VI (1045–1046). Henry III, Holy Roman Emperor met Gregory VI in 1046 and received him favorably. By December, however, Henry III had changed his mind and ordered Benedict IX, Sylvester III, and Gregory VI to appear before him in a synod in Sutri. Gregory VI was the only one to show up, and he was declared guilty of simony and deposed on December 20. Sylvester III had long since given up being pope and returned to acting as Bishop of Sabina but he too was deprived of his orders and forced to retire to a monastery.

Three days later, in Rome, Benedict IX was excommunicated for simony and Henry III's candidate, Bishop Suidger of Bamberg, was installed as Pope Clement II (1046–1047).

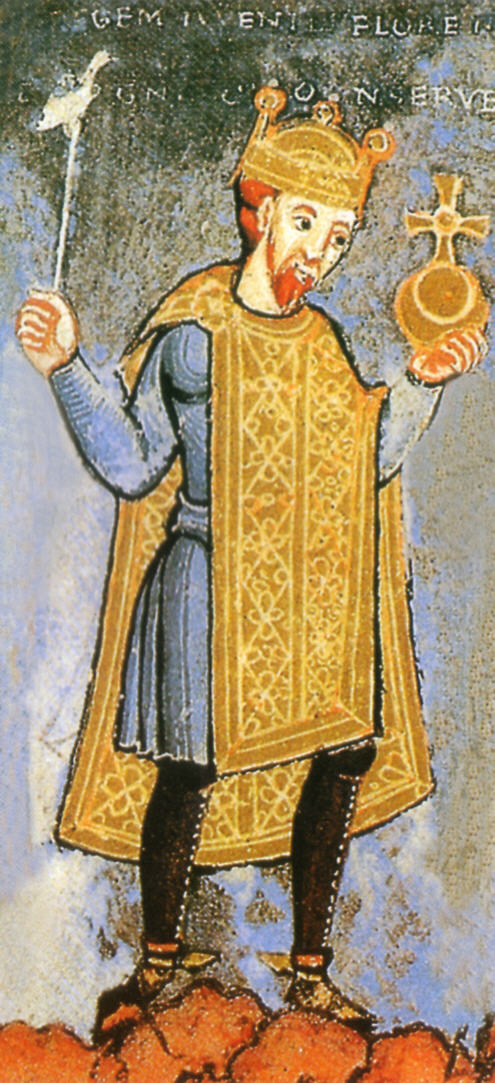
Henry III deposed

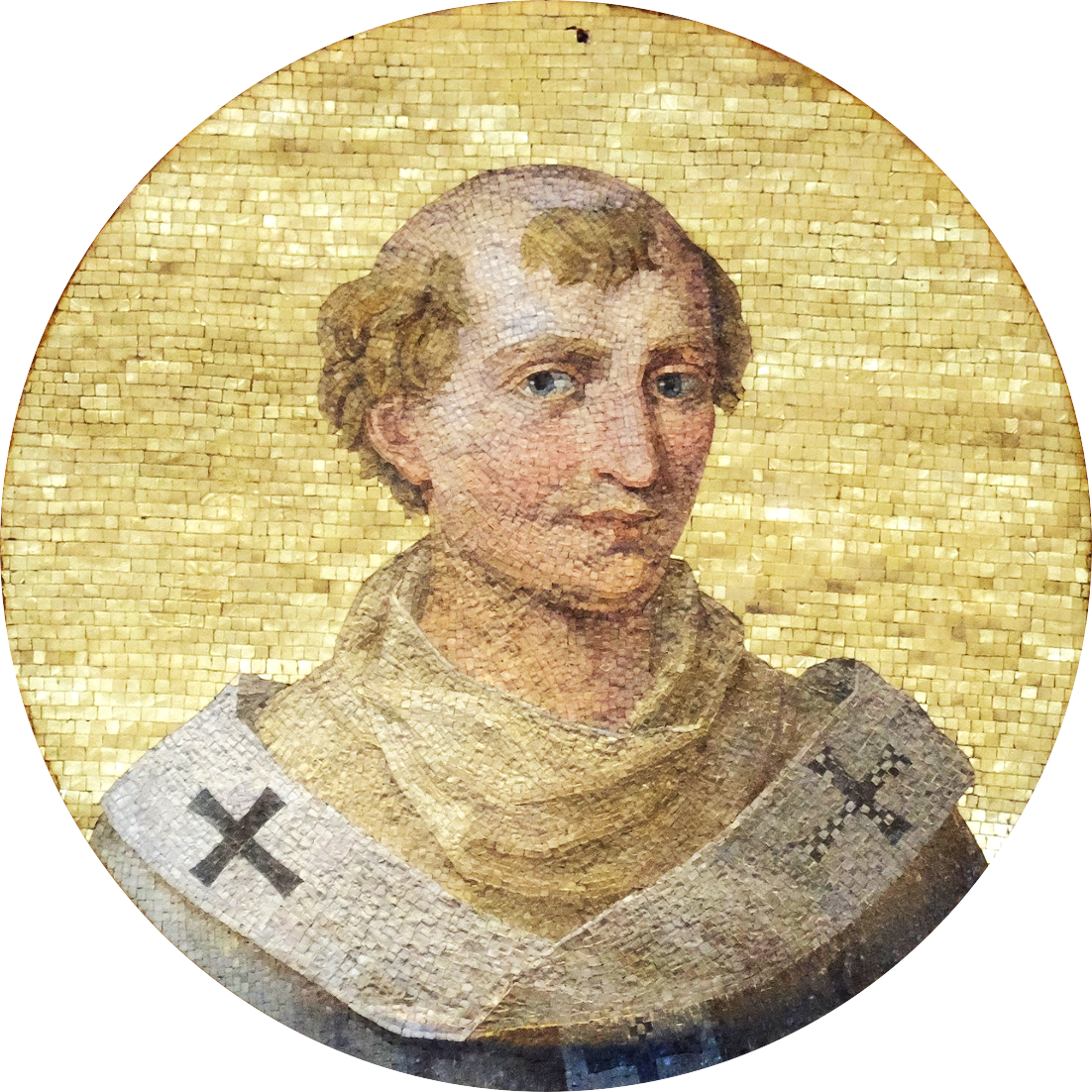
Benedict IX,

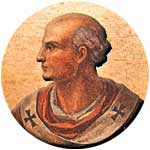
Sylvester III,

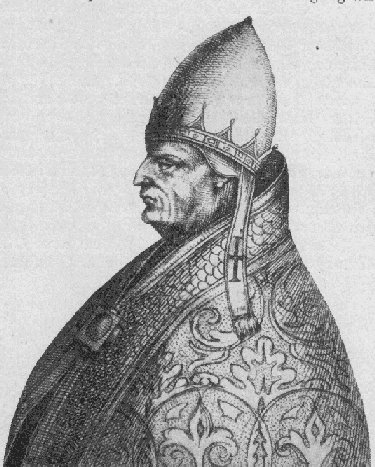
and Gregory VI

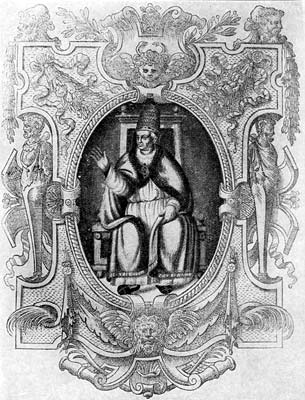
and installed Clement II.

== Aftermath ==
According to John Cowdrey, "the decline of the Tusculans and Crescentians was to a limited extent balanced by the emergence of newer families which were to provide valuable support for Gregory VII and the popes that followed him", including the Frangipani family and Pierleoni family.

== Legacy ==
The Tusculan Papacy "shaped other aspects of papal policy far beyond the reigns of the Tusculan popes themselves". The Chancery underwent important changes, and the filioque clause was introduced. A synod following Henry II's coronation in 1014 agreed to adopt the Frankish custom of reciting the Nicene Creed along with other prayers at mass on Sundays and other Holidays.
