= Pope Damasus II =

Head of the Catholic Church in 1048

- Bishop of Rome
- Church: Catholic Church
- Papacy began: 17 July 1048
- Papacy ended: 9 August 1048
- Predecessor: Benedict IX
- Successor: Leo IX

Personal details
- Born: Poppo von Brixen c. 1000 Pildenau, Duchy of Bavaria, Holy Roman Empire
- Died: 9 August 1048 Palestrina, Papal States, Holy Roman Empire
- Buried: San Lorenzo fuori le Mura

Pope Damasus II (/ˈdæməsəs/; died 9 August 1048, born Poppo von Brixen) was the Bishop of Rome and ruler of the Papal States from 17 July 1048 to his death on 9 August that same year. He was the second of the German pontiffs nominated by Emperor Henry III. A native of Bavaria, he was the third German to become pope and had one of the shortest papal reigns.

Upon the death of Clement II, envoys from Rome were sent to the emperor to ascertain who should be named pope. Henry named the bishop of Brixen, Poppo de' Curagnoni. While the envoys were away, the former pope Benedict IX reasserted himself and with the assistance of the disaffected Margrave Boniface III of Tuscany once again assumed the papacy. Henry ordered Boniface to escort Poppo to Rome, but Boniface declined, pointing out that the Romans had already enthroned Benedict. Enraged, the emperor ordered the margrave to depose Benedict or suffer the consequences. Poppo became pope in mid-July but died less than a month later, in Palestrina.

== Early life ==
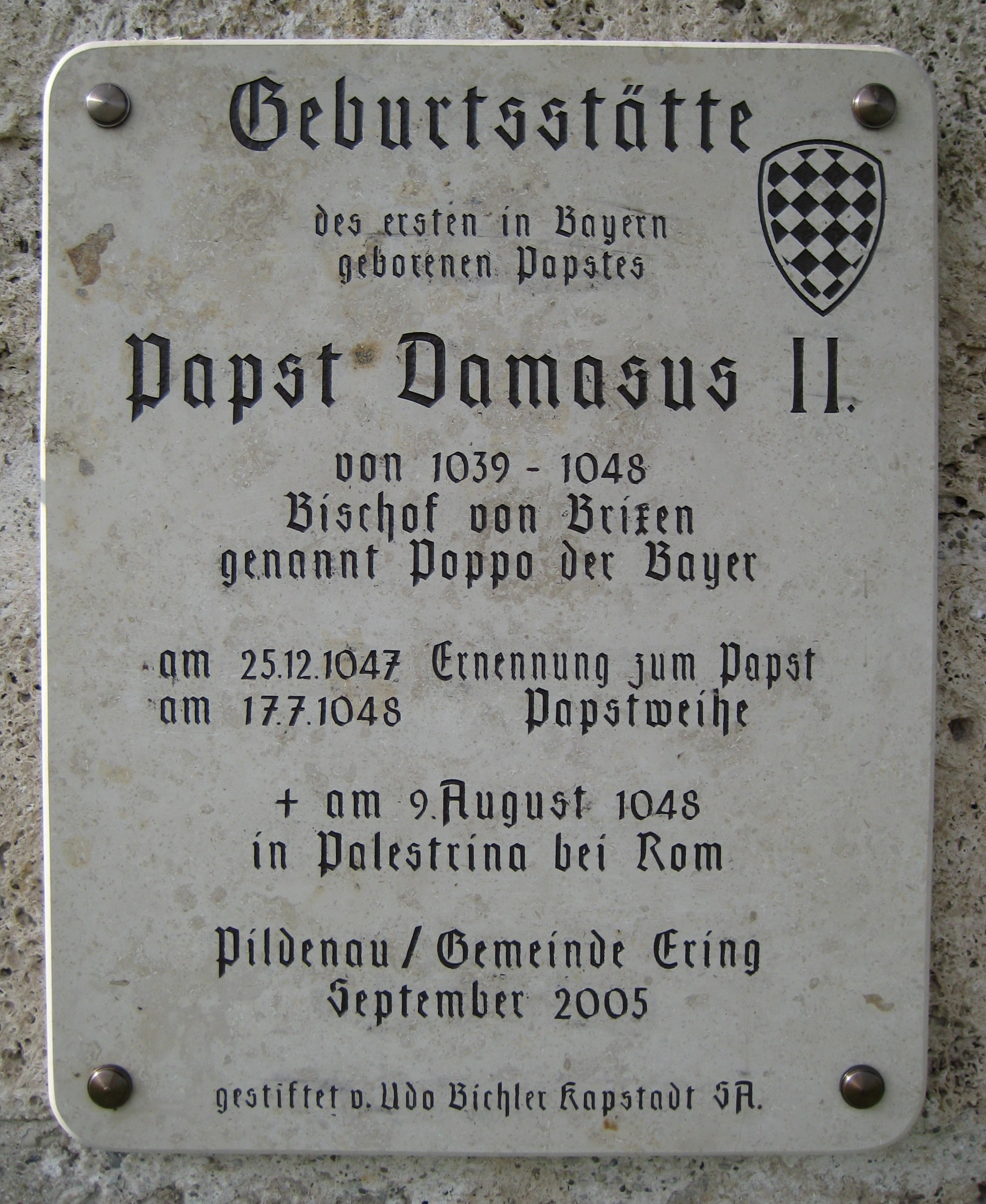
Plaque in Pildenau marking Damasus II's birthplace

Born into an ancient Bavarian House of Babonen, Poppo was a younger son of Count Poppo II von Rott. He became the Bishop of Brixen in Tyrol in 1040, upon nomination by King Henry III. He was already consecrated by 16 January 1040. Poppo was also a key advisor to King Henry III of Germany and travelled with him to Italy for his imperial coronation in 1046.

== Imperial intervention ==
In 1046, the city of Rome was in chaos. It had three popes, Benedict IX, Sylvester III, and Gregory VI, one at St. Peter's, one at the Lateran, and a third at S. Maria Maggiore. There was street fighting between inhabitants of the city proper and the inhabitants of the Trastevere region. Pope Gregory VI's archdeacon, Peter, took matters into his own hands, summoned a Roman synod, and sent representatives to the Emperor Henry III, begging for aid to restore order. Henry, who was looking forward to his imperial coronation in Rome, needed one, clear, universally acknowledged pope to perform the ceremony. He left Augsburg, therefore, and was in Verona in the second week of September 1046. There he held a military review. He then moved to Pavia, where he was in residence by 25 October 1046, and where he held both a synodale concilium and a populare iudicium. One of the bishops present at the synod was Poppo of Brixen. On 25 November, the King was in Lucca, and on 1 December at San Genesio, near San Miniato. Finally he reached Sutri, only 56 km (35 mi) from Rome. There he summoned a synod on 20 December 1046, which came to be attended by 1046 bishops and by the Roman clergy. The three papal claimants were ordered to appear, and Gregory VI and Sylvester III did so. Gregory was compelled to recite the circumstances of his election, which seemed to many of the bishops to be simoniacal; realizing the depth of his difficulties, Gregory resigned his papal office and claims. Sylvester was deposed, and ordered to a monastery. Benedict had already fled to his relatives in Tusculum. The imperial party then moved on to Rome, where another synod was held on 23 and 24 December. The once deposed, and anathematized, Benedict IX, was again deposed, as were the other two already deposed claimants, and the throne of Peter declared vacant. Henry acknowledged the right of the Romans to elect their own bishop, absent an emperor. but the Roman senators begged the emperor to give them a suitable candidate. Henry first named Bishop Adalbert of Hamburg and Bremen, but he declined. Then the King named Bishop Suidger of Bamberg in Bavaria, who was elected on Christmas Eve as Clement II. Both pope and emperor were crowned next day. Clement died less than ten months later, on 9 October 1047, at the abbey of S. Tommaso near Pesaro.

== Imperial nomination of Poppo ==
Henry III in 1046 had displayed his imperial power by intervening against Pope Gregory VI and installing Clement II. The Roman plebs, acknowledging that power, sent an embassy to the emperor, which found Henry, who had been engaged in an indecisive campaign in Frisia, in his palace at Pöhlde in Saxony shortly before Christmas Day of 1047. They notified the emperor of Clement's death and asked him, in his capacity as patricius of the Romans, to appoint a successor. The envoys, following their instructions, suggested as a suitable candidate Halinard, Archbishop of Lyon, who was a fluent speaker of Italian, and was well respected in Rome.

Henry was unwilling to rush matters, and so asked Wazo of Liège, the most independent bishop within the empire, who ought to be made pope. After careful consideration, Wazo declared that the most appropriate candidate for the vacant papal throne was the man the emperor had removed – Gregory VI. Wazo's deliberations had taken time, and Henry soon lost patience. Henry instead appointed Poppo, bishop of Brixen in Tyrol, a proud man of distinguished learning who had taken part in the Synod of Sutri. This decision antagonized the Romans, who were still pushing for Halinard to become the new pope. Nevertheless, Henry sent the Roman envoys back to Rome with presents to prepare for the arrival of their new pope.

== Arrival in Italy ==
During the envoys’ absence, imperial authority in Rome became virtually extinguished as the Tusculan faction reasserted its power. A former pope, Benedict IX, residing at Tusculum, had been watching the situation in Rome intently, and had decided that now was his opportunity to reclaim the papal throne. He approached the Margrave Boniface III of Tuscany for help, and Boniface, who did not like the emperor, was easily convinced to help anyone who would disrupt Henry's authority. After Benedict had used his extensive supply of gold to gain a large number of followers, the margrave's influence enabled him to occupy the papal throne for over eight months, from 8 November 1047 until 17 July 1048.

In the meantime, Henry was marching down towards Italy with Poppo, accompanying him at least as far as Ulm, where they were in residence on 25 January 1048. Here it came to light that the papal exchequer was close to bankrupt, and so Poppo was allowed to retain the revenues of his see. In addition, a deed was drawn up on 25 January 1048 that granted Poppo an important forest in the Puster Valley, some 75 km east of Brixen. Having done this, and unable to leave Germany in case there might be an uprising during his absence, Henry III directed Margrave Boniface of Tuscany to conduct the pope-designate to Rome in person, and in the emperor's name to arrange for the enthroning of the new pope.

Given his role in the usurpation by Benedict IX, and his attitude towards Henry III, it is unsurprising that Boniface at first refused, advising Poppo when he entered Tuscany, "I cannot go to Rome with you. The Romans have again installed Benedict, and he has won over the whole city to his cause. Besides, I am now an old man." Having nowhere to turn, and unable to proceed, Poppo had no choice but to turn around and return to Germany, where he informed Henry of what had transpired.

== Papal coronation ==
Upon receiving the news, Henry was furious. Poppo was quickly sent back to Boniface, carrying with him a letter from the emperor which ordered Boniface to arrange the expulsion of Benedict and the enthroning of his successor. Henry was simple and direct. "Learn, you who have restored a pope who was canonically deposed, and who have been led by love of money to despise my commands; learn that, if you do not amend your ways, I will soon come and make you." These threats soon reduced Boniface to obedience. He sent a body of troops into Rome and forcibly expelled Benedict from the city.

After Benedict IX's removal, Poppo entered the city, as the Romans, with demonstrations of joy, welcomed the bishop who would be pope. He was enthroned at the Lateran as Pope Damasus II on 17 July 1048. His pontificate, however, was of short duration. Rumors circulated that he had been poisoned, allegedly by a man named Gerhard Brazutus, a friend of Benedict IX and a follower of Hildebrand. However, the source for this information is suspect. He retired to Palestrina. After a brief reign of twenty-three days, he died on 9 August 1048. A modern conjecture is that he died of malaria.

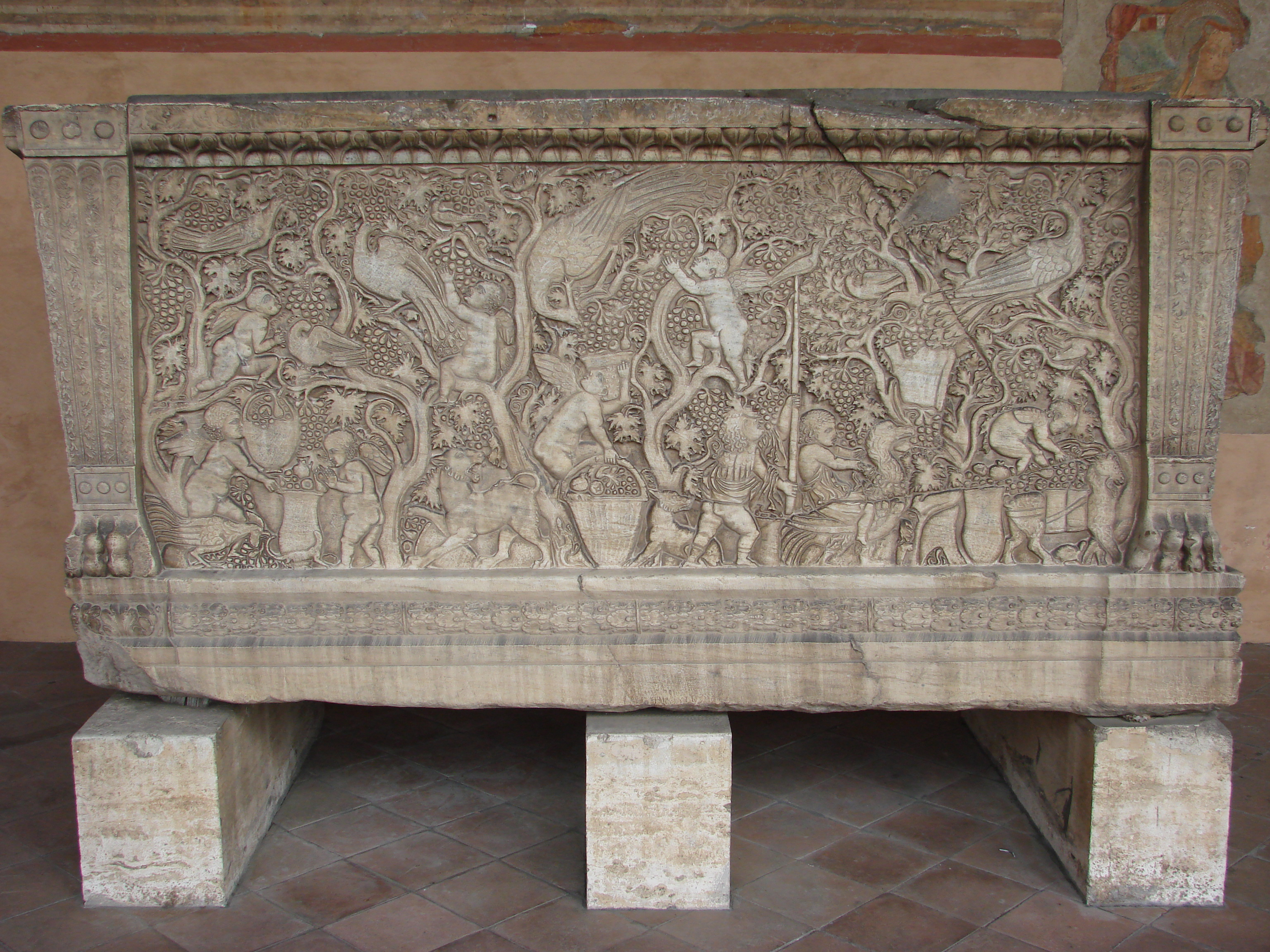
Sarcophagus believed to have been used for Damasus II in San Lorenzo fuori le Mura.

Pope Damasus II was buried in San Lorenzo fuori le Mura, according to Onuphrio Panvinio, the 16th century "scriptor" in the Vatican Library. The sarcophagus in which Damasus' body had been placed, and which was moved at least twice, was large and "adorned with reliefs representing a vineyard, with cupids as the wine gatherers."

== See also ==
- List of popes

== Bibliography ==
- "Annales Romani," in: Georg Heinrich Pertz (1844). Monumenta Germaniae Historica: Scriptorum (in Latin). Vol. Tomus V. Hannover: Hahn. pp. 468–480.
- Jaffé, Philippus (1885). Regesta pontificum Romanorum ab condita Ecclesia ad annum post Christum natum MCXCVIII (in Latin). Vol. Tomus primus (second ed.). Leipzig: Veit.
- Gregorovius, Ferdinand (1896). History of the City of Rome in the Middle Ages. Vol. IV, Part I. London: G. Bell & sons.
- Mann, Horace K. (1910), The Lives of the Popes in the Early Middle Ages, Volume 5: "The Popes In The Days of Feudal Anarchy, from Formosus to Damasus II", Part 2, London
- Steindorff, Ernst (1876). "Damasus II" . Allgemeine Deutsche Biographie (in German). Vol. 4. Leipzig: Duncker & Humblot. pp. 714–715.
- Elze, Reinhard (1957). "Damasus II". Neue Deutsche Biographie (in German). Vol. 3. Berlin: Duncker & Humblot. pp. 498–498. (full text online).
- Bautz, Friedrich Wilhelm (1975). "Damasus II". In Bautz, Friedrich Wilhelm (ed.). Biographisch-Bibliographisches Kirchenlexikon (BBKL) (in German). Vol. 1. Hamm: Bautz. col. 1200. ISBN 3-88309-013-1.
- Schieffer, Rudolf (1986). "Damasus II". Lexikon des Mittelalters, III: Codex Wintoniensis bis Erziehungs- und Bildungswesen (in German). Stuttgart and Weimar: J. B. Metzler. col. 470. ISBN 3-7608-8903-4.
- Bertolini, Paolo (1986). "Damaso II". Dizionario Biografico degli Italiani (in Italian). Vol. 32: Dall'Anconata–Da Ronco. Rome: Institute of the Italian Encyclopaedia. pp. 289–292. ISBN 978-88-12-00032-6.
- Bertolini, Paolo: Damaso II. In: Massimo Bray (ed.): Enciclopedia dei Papi. Volume 2: Niccolò I, santo, Sisto IV. Istituto della Enciclopedia Italiana, Rome 2000, pp. 153–156 (treccani.it).
- Hans Göttler, Hans (2005). "Spurensuche nach Papst Damasus II.," in: Pildenau am Inn: Geschichte und Legende des 1. Pontifex Maximus aus Altbayern, Tiefenbach: Verlag Töpfl

=== External links ===
- Literature by and about Pope Damasus II in the German National Library catalogue

Catholic Church titles
Preceded by Benedict IX	Pope; 1048	Succeeded by Leo IX
