= Papal renunciation =

Resignation of the pope of the Catholic Church

A papal renunciation (Latin: renuntiatio), also called a papal abdication, occurs when the current pope of the Catholic Church voluntarily resigns his position. As a pope conventionally holds the office for life, a papal renunciation is an uncommon event. Before the 21st century, only five popes unambiguously resigned with historical certainty, all between the 10th and 15th centuries. There are disputed claims of four popes having resigned, dating from the 3rd to the 11th centuries; a fifth disputed case may have involved an antipope.

Additionally, a few popes during the saeculum obscurum were "deposed", meaning driven from office by force. The history and canonical question here is complicated; generally, the official Vatican list of popes seems to recognize such "depositions" as valid renunciations if the pope acquiesced, but not if he did not. The later development of canon law has been in favor of papal supremacy, leaving no recourse to the removal of a pope involuntarily.

The most recent pope to resign was Benedict XVI, who vacated the Holy See on 28 February 2013, the date of his effective resignation. He was the first pope to do so since Gregory XII in 1415.

Despite its common usage in discussion of papal renunciations, the term abdication is not used in the official documents of the church for renunciation by a pope.

== Modern procedure ==
In the Latin Church of the Catholic Church, the official laws on all matters are codified in the Latin edition of the 1983 Code of Canon Law. This regulates papal renunciations in canon 332 §2, where it states:

- Si contingat ut Romanus Pontifex muneri suo renuntiet, ad validitatem requiritur ut renuntiatio libere fiat et rite manifestetur, non vero ut a quopiam acceptetur. (In English: If it happens that the Roman Pontiff resigns his office, it is required for validity that the resignation be made freely and properly manifested but not that it is accepted by anyone.)

This corresponds to canon 221 of the 1917 Code of Canon Law, which in Latin is:

- Si contingat ut Romanus Pontifex renuntiet, ad eiusdem renuntiationis validitatem non est necessaria Cardinalium aliorumve acceptatio. (In English: If it happens that the Roman Pontiff resigns his office, it is not required for validity that the resignation is accepted by the Cardinals or by anyone else.)

Both the 1983 code and the 1917 code make explicit that there is no particular individual or body of people to whom the pope must manifest his renunciation. This addresses a concern raised in earlier centuries, specifically by 18th-century canonist Lucius Ferraris, who held that the College of Cardinals or at least its Dean must be informed, since the cardinals must be absolutely certain that the pope has renounced the dignity before they can validly proceed to elect a successor.

In 1996, Pope John Paul II, in his Apostolic Constitution Universi Dominici gregis, anticipated the possibility of resignation when he specified that the procedures he set out in that document should be observed "even if the vacancy of the Apostolic See should occur as a result of the resignation of the Supreme Pontiff".

== History ==
The Catholic Encyclopedia notes the historically obscure renunciations of Pontian (230–235) and Marcellinus (296–308), the historically postulated renunciation of Liberius (352–366), and mentions that one (unspecified) catalogue of popes lists John XVIII as resigning office in 1009 and finishing his life as a monk.

=== 11th century ===
The first historically unquestionable papal renunciation is that of Benedict IX in 1045. Benedict had also previously been deposed by Sylvester III in 1044, and though he returned to take up the office again the next year, the Vatican considers Sylvester III to have been a legitimate pope in the intervening months (meaning that Benedict IX must be considered to have validly resigned by acquiescing to the deposition in 1044). Then, in 1045, having regained the papacy for a few months, in order to rid the church of the scandalous Benedict, Gregory VI gave Benedict "valuable possessions" to resign the papacy in his favour. Gregory himself resigned in 1046 because the arrangement he had entered into with Benedict could have been considered simony. Gregory was followed by Clement II, and when Clement died, Benedict IX returned to be elected to the papacy for a third time, only to resign yet again before dying in a monastery. He was thus pope for three non-consecutive periods of time, and either resigned or was deposed three times.

=== Celestine V ===
A well-known renunciation of a pope is that of Celestine V, in 1294. After only five months as pope, he issued a solemn decree declaring it permissible for a pope to resign, and then did so himself. He lived two more years as a hermit and then prisoner of his successor Boniface VIII, and was later canonised. Celestine's decree, and Boniface concurring (not revoking it), ended any doubt among canonists about the possibility of a valid papal renunciation.

=== Western Schism ===
Gregory XII (1406–1415) resigned in 1415 in order to end the Western Schism, which had reached the point where there were three claimants to the papal throne: Gregory XII in Rome, Benedict XIII in Avignon, and John XXIII in Pisa. Before resigning, he formally convened the already existing Council of Constance and authorized it to elect his successor.

=== Benedict XVI ===
Benedict XVI's renunciation of the papacy took effect on 28 February 2013 at 20:00 (8:00 pm) CET (19:00 UTC), after being announced on the morning of 11 February by the Vatican. He was the first pope to relinquish the office since Gregory XII resigned to end the Western Schism in 1415 and the first to do so on his own initiative since Celestine V in 1294. His action was unexpected, given that the modern era popes have held the position from election until death. He said he was motivated by his declining health due to old age. The conclave to select his successor began on 12 March 2013 and elected Cardinal Jorge Mario Bergoglio, Archbishop of Buenos Aires, who took the name Francis.

== List of papal renunciations ==
Pontificate	Portrait	Regnal name	Personal name	Reason for renunciation	Notes
Alleged resignations
21 July 230 – 28 September 235 (5 years, 69 days)		St Pontian	Pontianus	Exiled by Roman authorities	Renunciation documented only in the Liberian Catalogue, which records his renunciation as 28 September 235, the earliest exact date in papal history.
30 June 296 – 25 October 304 (8 years, 117 days)		St Marcellinus	Marcellinus	Said to have been tainted by offerings to the pagan gods during the Diocletian persecution	Renunciation is documented only in the Liberian Catalogue.
17 May 352 – 24 September 366 (14 years, 130 days)		Liberius	Liberius	Banished by Emperor Constantius II	Renunciation is speculated to explain the succession of Antipope Felix II, although Liber Pontificalis argues that Liberius retained office in exile.
25 December 1003 – 18 July 1009 (5 years, 205 days)		John XVIII	Giovanni Fasano	Abdicated and retired to a monastery	Renunciation documented only in one catalog of popes
13 January 1045 – 10 March 1045 (56 days)		Sylvester III	Giovanni dei Crescenzi-Ottaviani	Driven out of office by the return of Benedict IX	Some claim he was never pope, but an antipope. The official Vatican list includes him however, which assumes Benedict IX acquiesced to his first deposition and that the new election was valid. Sylvester returned to his old bishopric, seemingly accepting the deposition.
Reliable resignations
22 May 964 – 23 June 964 (32 days)		Benedict V	Benedetto	Deposed by Emperor Otto I	Deposed in favor of the antipope Leo VIII, who then became a valid pope. Benedict's abdication was considered valid. Retained the rank of deacon. Lived out the rest of his life in Hamburg under the care of Adaldag, Archbishop of Hamburg-Bremen.
Oct 1032–Sept 1044; April 1045–May 1045; Nov 1047–July 1048		Benedict IX	Teofilatto di Tuscolo	Deposed briefly from his first term as pope, bribed to resign his second term after several reputed scandals, and also resigned his third term	Earliest renunciation recognized in the ordering of popes. He was pope on three occasions between 1032 and 1048. One of the youngest popes, he was the only man to have been pope on more than one occasion and the only man ever to have sold the papacy.
1 May 1045 – 20 December 1046 (1 year, 233 days)		Gregory VI	Giovanni Graziano Pierleoni	Accused of simony for bribing Benedict IX to resign	Abdicated or deposed at the Council of Sutri.
5 July 1294 – 13 December 1294 (161 days)		St Celestine V	Pietro Angelerio da Morrone	Lack of competence for the office	With no administrative experience, Celestine V fell under the control of secular politicians. To protect the church, he resigned. He was the first pope to establish canons for renunciation.
30 November 1406 – 4 July 1415 (8 years, 216 days)		Gregory XII	Angelo Correr	To end the Western Schism	Abdicated during the Council of Constance, which had been called by his opponent, Antipope John XXIII.
19 April 2005 – 28 February 2013 (7 years, 315 days)		Benedict XVI	Joseph Alois Ratzinger	Main article: Resignation of Pope Benedict XVI Physical infirmity due to advanced age (85 at the time)	Became pope emeritus upon renunciation.

== Conditional renunciations not put into effect ==
Before setting out for Paris to crown Napoleon in 1804, Pope Pius VII (1800–1823) signed a document of renunciation to take effect if he were imprisoned in France.

During World War II, Pope Pius XII drew up a document ordering that his resignation take effect immediately if he were kidnapped by the Nazis, as was thought likely in August 1943. It was thought that the College of Cardinals would evacuate to a neutral country, perhaps Portugal, and elect his successor.

According to longtime curial official Cardinal Giovanni Battista Re, Pope Paul VI handwrote two letters in the late 1960s or 1970, well before his death, in anticipation of an incapacitating illness. One letter was addressed to the College of Cardinals, the other to the Secretary of State, whose name was not specified. Pope John Paul II showed them to Re, and they were shown to Pope Benedict XVI in 2003. In 2018, Paul's letter dated 2 May 1965 and addressed to the dean of the College of Cardinals was published. He wrote that "In case of infirmity, which is believed to be incurable or is of long duration and which impedes us from sufficiently exercising the functions of our apostolic ministry; or in the case of another serious and prolonged impediment", he renounced his office "both as bishop of Rome as well as head of the same holy Catholic Church".

Pope John Paul II wrote a letter in 1989 offering to resign if he became incapacitated. The letter said that if ill health or some other unforeseen difficulty prevented him from "sufficiently carrying out the functions of my apostolic ministry ... I renounce my sacred and canonical office, both as bishop of Rome as well as head of the holy Catholic Church." In 1994 he wrote a document that he apparently planned to read aloud, which explained that he had determined he could not resign merely because of age, as other bishops are required to do, but only "in the presence of an incurable illness or an impediment", and that he would therefore continue in office. He prayed in his will, written in 2000, that God "would help me to recognise how long I must continue this service", suggesting that renunciation was possible. In the weeks before his death in 2005, there was press speculation that John Paul might resign because of his failing health.

Pope Francis had confirmed he had a resignation letter prepared in the first months of his pontificate, in the event he needed to abdicate his position due to illness "impeding his work" as pope. This letter was never enforced, and he died in office in 2025.

== Incapacitation ==
Canon law makes no provision for a pope being incapacitated by reason of health, either temporarily or permanently; nor does it specify what body has the authority to certify that the pope is incapacitated. It does state that "When the Roman See is vacant, or completely impeded, no innovation is to be made in the governance of the universal Church."

== See also ==
- Sede vacante
- Jewish pope Andreas, a Jewish legend about a Jewish boy in the Middle Ages from the German town of Mainz who is kidnapped while asleep, told his parents had died, converts to Catholicism, becomes a priest and is elected Pope but then engineers a meeting with Mainz Jews, discovers his rabbi father is still alive when he appears, before admitting to his father that he is his long-lost son, abdicates from the papacy, converts back to Judaism and moves back to Mainz.
