= 1045 =

1045 in various calendars
- Gregorian calendar: 1045; MXLV
- Ab urbe condita: 1798
- Armenian calendar: 494; ԹՎ ՆՂԴ
- Assyrian calendar: 5795
- Balinese saka calendar: 966–967
- Bengali calendar: 451–452
- Berber calendar: 1995
- English Regnal year: N/A
- Buddhist calendar: 1589
- Burmese calendar: 407
- Byzantine calendar: 6553–6554
- Chinese calendar: 甲申年 (Wood Monkey); 3742 or 3535 — to — 乙酉年 (Wood Rooster); 3743 or 3536
- Coptic calendar: 761–762
- Discordian calendar: 2211
- Ethiopian calendar: 1037–1038
- Hebrew calendar: 4805–4806
- Hindu calendars
- Vikram Samvat: 1101–1102
- Shaka Samvat: 966–967
- Kali Yuga: 4145–4146
- Holocene calendar: 11045
- Igbo calendar: 45–46
- Iranian calendar: 423–424
- Islamic calendar: 436–437
- Japanese calendar: Kantoku 2 (寛徳２年)
- Javanese calendar: 948–949
- Julian calendar: 1045; MXLV
- Korean calendar: 3378
- Minguo calendar: 867 before ROC 民前867年
- Nanakshahi calendar: −423
- Seleucid era: 1356/1357 AG
- Thai solar calendar: 1587–1588
- Tibetan calendar: ཤིང་ཕོ་སྤྲེ་ལོ་ (male Wood-Monkey); 1171 or 790 or 18 — to — ཤིང་མོ་བྱ་ལོ་ (female Wood-Bird); 1172 or 791 or 19

Year 1045 (MXLV) was a common year starting on Tuesday of the Julian calendar.

== Events ==
- January 20 – Pope Sylvester III becomes the 146th pope, succeeding Benedict IX, who abdicated during the previous year.
- January 23 – Edward the Confessor, King of England, marries Edith of Wessex (daughter of Earl Godwin) and she is crowned queen consort at Winchester. This year also in England, Edward begins construction of Westminster Abbey.
- February – Pope Sylvester III is deposed (election deemed invalid); Pope Benedict IX is elected once more, becoming the 147th pope.
- February 5 – Emperor Go-Reizei ascends the throne of Japan.
- May 5 – Pope Gregory VI becomes the 148th pope, following the resignation of Pope Benedict IX in exchange for money. There are growing allegations that simony is taking place during Gregory VI's reign.
- Movable type printing is invented by Bi Sheng in China.
- The Qingli Reforms, put forth by the Chinese statesman Fan Zhongyan in 1043, are halted by their conservative ministerial peers, but will later influence reform efforts under Wang Anshi.
- The Bagratid Kingdom of Armenia is surrendered to the Byzantine Empire, ending the Kingdom.
- Harald Hardrada returns to Scandinavia through Sigtuna in Sweden, after escaping from the Byzantine Empire with a fortune.

== Births ==
- Huang Tingjian, famous Chinese calligrapher, painter and poet (d. 1105)
- Approximate date
  - Margaret, queen consort of Scotland (d. 1093)
  - Robert of Arbrissel (d. 1116), Bretonic preacher and founder of Fontevraud Abbey
  - Stephen, Count of Blois (d. 1102)

== Deaths ==
- February 7 – Emperor Go-Suzaku of Japan (b. 1009)
- May 27 – Bruno of Würzburg, imperial chancellor of Italy (b. c. 1005)
- June 27 – Hemma of Gurk, Austrian religious founder and countess (b. 980)
- Radbot, Count of Habsburg (b. 985)
- Approximate date – Maria Skleraina, Byzantine Imperial political adviser
