= Sutri =

- Comune
- Comune di Sutri
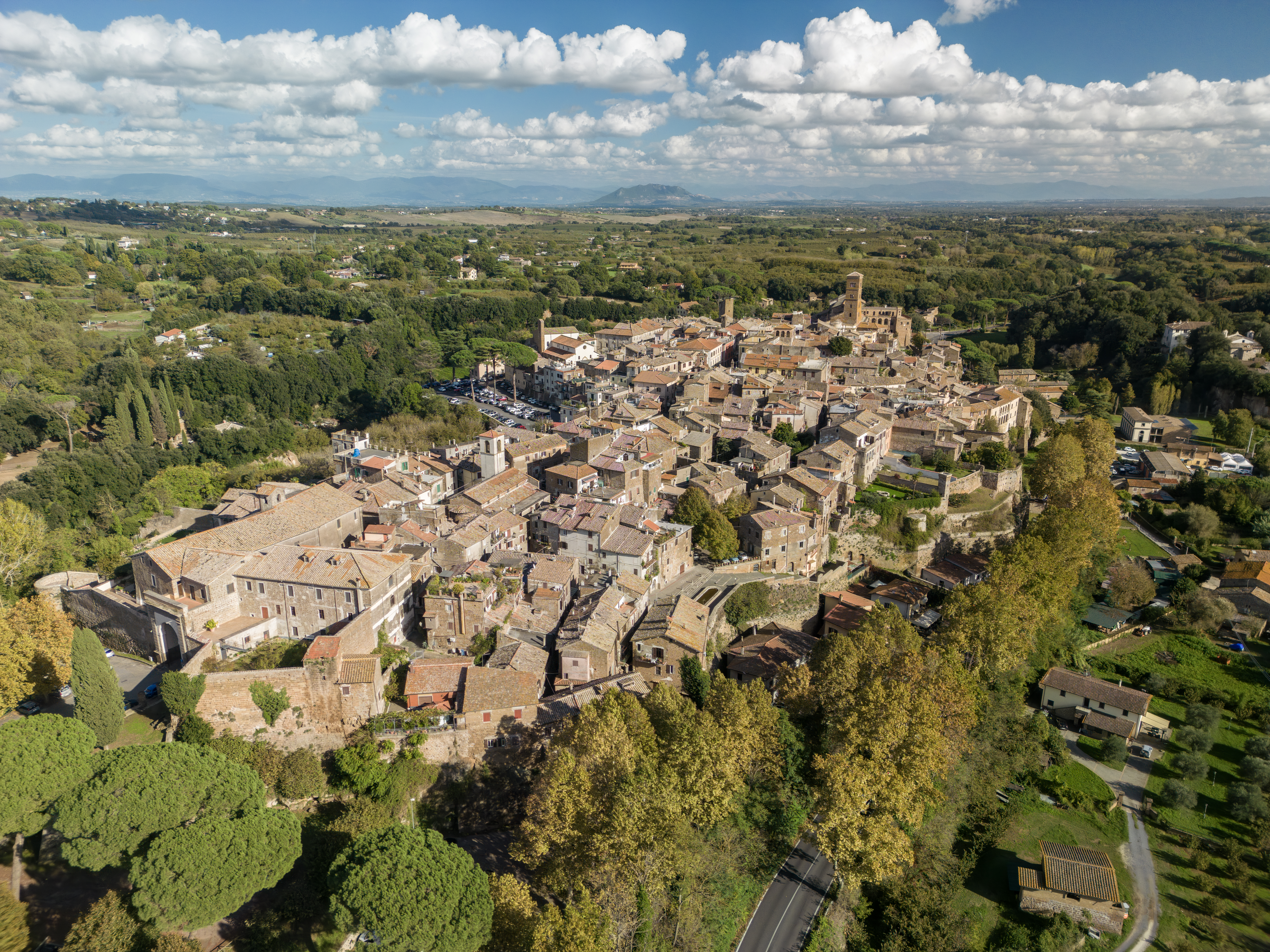
- Panorama

- Location within Italy Location within Lazio
- Coordinates: 42°14′N 12°17′E
- Country: Italy
- Region: Lazio
- Province: Viterbo (VT)

Government
  - Mayor: Matteo Amori

Area
  - Total: 60.94 km^{2} (23.53 sq mi)
- Elevation: 291 m (955 ft)

Population (30 November 2021)
  - Total: 6,565
  - Density: 107.7/km^{2} (279.0/sq mi)
- Demonym: Sutrini
- Time zone: UTC+1 (CET)
  - Summer (DST): UTC+2 (CEST)
- Postal code: 01015
- Dialing code: 0761
- Patron saint: Sta. Dolcissima
- Saint day: September 16
- Website: Official website

Sutri (Latin Sutrium) is an Ancient town, modern comune and former bishopric (now a Latin titular see) in the province of Viterbo, about 50 kilometres (31 mi) from Rome and about 30 kilometres (19 mi) south of Viterbo. It is picturesquely situated on a narrow tuff hill, surrounded by ravines, a narrow neck on the west alone connecting it with the surrounding country. It is one of I Borghi più belli d'Italia ("The most beautiful villages of Italy").

The modern comune of Sutri has a few more than 5,000 inhabitants. Its ancient remains are a major draw for tourism: a Roman amphitheatre excavated in the tuff rock, an Etruscan necropolis with dozens of rock-cut tombs, a Mithraeum incorporated in the crypt of its church of the Madonna del Parto, a Romanesque Duomo.

== History ==
Ancient Sutrium occupied an important position, commanding as it did the road into Etruria, the later Via Cassia: Livy describes it as one of the keys of Etruria, nearby Nepi being the other. It came into the hands of Rome after the fall of Veii, and a Latin colony was founded there; it was lost again in 386 BC, but was recovered and recolonized around 383 BC. It was besieged by the Etruscans in 311–310 BC, but not taken. With Nepi and ten other Latin colonies it refused further help in the Second Punic War in 209 BC. Its importance as a fortress explains, according to Festus, the proverb Sutrium ire, of one who goes on important business, as it occurs in Plautus. It is mentioned in. the war of 41 BC, and received a colony of veterans under the triumviri (Colonia coniuncta lulia Sutrina). Inscriptions show that it was a place of some importance under the empire, and it is mentioned as occupied by the Lombards.

Sutri retained its strategic importance as a fortified place near the borders of the Duchy of Rome. The Donation of Sutri was an agreement reached at Sutri between the Lombard king Liutprand the Lombard and Pope Gregory II in 728. At Sutri the two reached an agreement, by which Sutri and some hill towns in Latium (see Vetralla) were given to the Papacy, "as a gift to the blessed Apostles Peter and Paul" according to the Liber Pontificalis. The pact formed the first extension of Papal territory beyond the confines of the Duchy of Rome. An important hoard of jewellery dating from this time, known as the Sutri Treasure, was found near the town in the 19th century. It is now in the British Museum.

Sutri, the seat of a bishopric (see below), was retrieved for the Papacy after the defeat of the Lombards.

Pope Gregory VI abdicated at Sutri on December 20, 1046, following the Synod of Sutri convened at the request of Emperor Henry III. In 1111 it was the seat of the treaty between Paschal II and Emperor Henry V; in 1146 and 1244 Eugene III and Innocent IV took refuge here, respectively. In 1244 it was conquered by Pietro di Vico, but was later taken by Pandolfo, count of Anguillara, who gave it back to the Papal States.

The city witnessed the struggles between Guelphs and Ghibellines. In 1433 the condottiero Niccolò Fortebraccio set fire to Sutri, and from that point onward the city declined in favour of Ronciglione.

== Ecclesiastical history ==
Established circa 500 as Diocese of Sutri (Italian) or Sutrium (Latin), without direct predecessor.

In 900 it gained canonical territory from the suppressed Diocese of Monterano. Pope Gregory VI abdicated at Sutri on December 20, 1046, following the Synod of Sutri, a non-ecumenical council convened at the request of Emperor Henry III to resolve three rival claims to the papacy, ultimately in favor of an imperial German protégé, Pope Clement II.

On 1435.12.12 it was suppressed itself, its territory and title being merged into the newly renamed Diocese of Nepi-Sutri.

Recorded incumbent Bishops (very incomplete):

- Tommaso, Dominican Order (O.P.) (1325.06.07 – ?)

=== Titular see ===
The diocese was nominally restored in 1991 as Latin Titular bishopric of Sutri (Curiate Italian) or Sutrium (Latin).

It has had the following incumbents, of the fitting episcopal (lowest) rank with two archiepiscopal exceptions:

- Titular Archbishop: Paolo Sardi (1996.12.10 – 2010.11.20), between Roman Curia offices: previously Vice-Assessor for General Affairs of Papal Secretariat of State (1992 – 1996.12.10), later Vice-Chamberlain of the Holy Roman Church of the Apostolic Camera (2004.10.23 – 2011.01.22), Pro-Patron of Sovereign Military Hospitaller Order of Saint John of Jerusalem of Rhodes and of Malta (2009.06.06 – 2010.11.30), created Cardinal-Deacon of S. Maria Ausiliatrice in Via Tuscolana (2010.11.20 [2011.05.24] – ...), promoted Patron of above Sovereign Military Hospitaller Order of Saint John of Jerusalem of Rhodes and of Malta (2010.11.30 – 2014.11.08)
- Titular Bishop: Christoph Schönborn, Dominican order (O.P.) (1991.07.11 – 1995.04.13) as Auxiliary Bishop of Wien (Vienna, Austria) (1991.07.11 – 1995.04.13); later promoted Coadjutor Archbishop of above Wien (Austria) (1995.04.13 – 1995.09.14), succeeding as Metropolitan Archbishop of above Vienna (Wien, Austria) (1995.09.14 – ...), also Ordinary of Austria of the Eastern Rite (1995.11.06 – ...), created Cardinal-Priest of Gesù Divin Lavoratore (1998.02.21 [1998.11.22] – ...), President of Episcopal Conference of Austria (1998.06.30 – ...), Member of Commission of Cardinals overseeing the Institute for Works of Religion (2014.01.15 – ...)
- Titular Archbishop: Antonio Guido Filipazzi (2011.01.08 – ...)

== Main sights ==
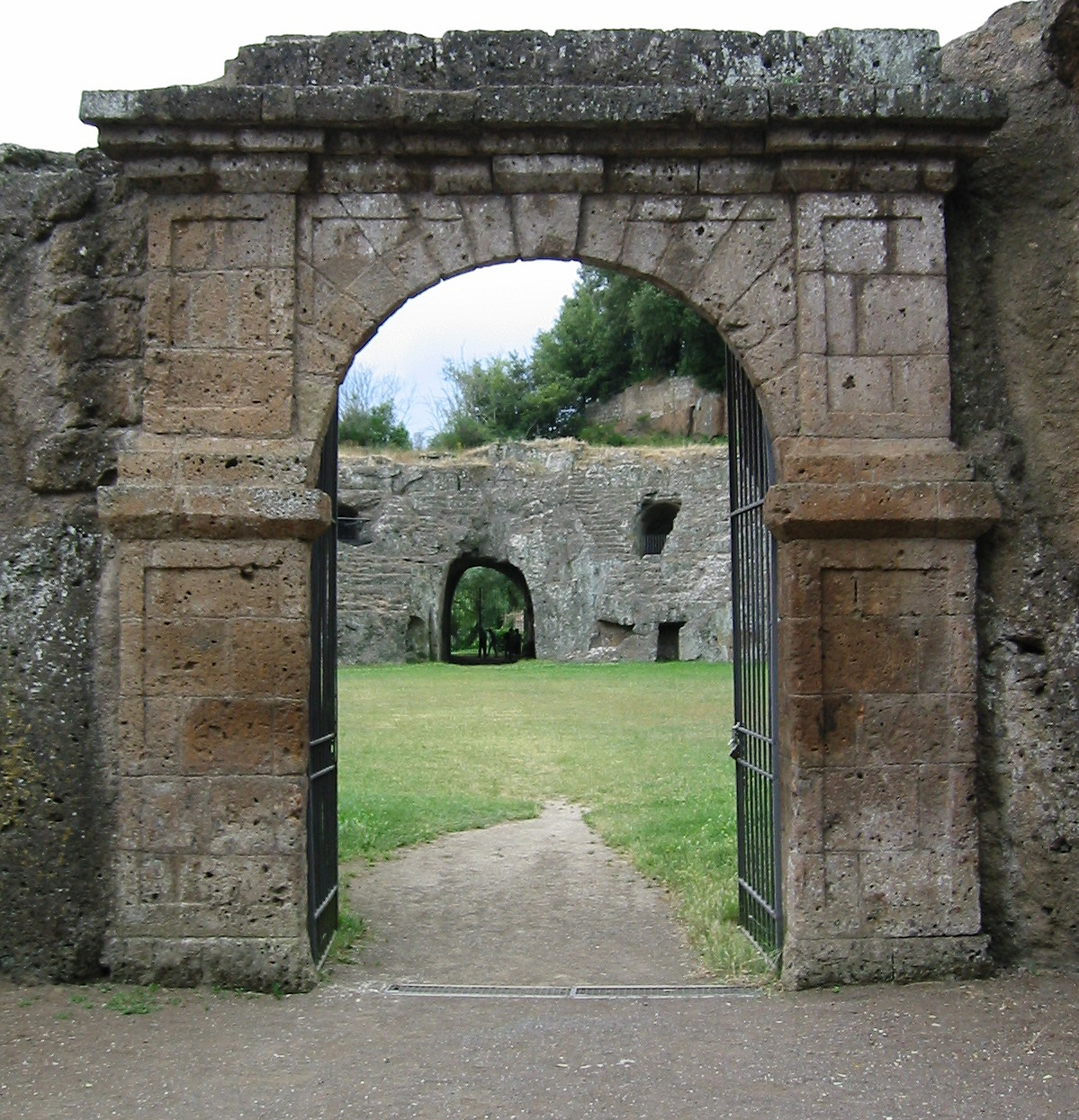
Entrance to the amphitheatre of Sutri

The most striking edifice is the rock-hewn amphitheatre of the Roman period, one of the most suggestive monuments of the ancient Latium (Lazio). Of elliptical plan, it measures about 49 by 40 metres (161 by 131 ft).

There are some remains of the ancient city walls of rectangular blocks of tuff on the southern side of the town, and some rock-cut sewers in the cliffs below them.

The cathedral, of Romanesque origin, is largely modern: of the medieval edifice the belltower (1207) and the crypt, from the Lombard period, with seven naves divided by twenty columns of different origin.

In the cliffs opposite the town on the south is the rock-cut church of the Madonna del Parto, developed out of one of the numerous Etruscan tombs of the area (according to some scholars, it was a mithraeum, pagan soldier cult site).

== Transportation ==
Sutri can be reached through the Via Cassia from Rome or Viterbo. The nearest railway station, on the line for Rome, is that of Capranica.

== Sources and external links ==
- George Dennis on Sutri in 1848

- GCatholic ecclesiastical history
