= Palatinus in the Catholic Church =

Former positions in the Roman Catholic Church

Palatinus (plural: Palatini), Latin for "palatial", were designations for various ecclesiastical offices in the Catholic Church, primarily of certain high officials in the papal court.

== Medieval Palatine judges ==
In the Middle Ages, the judices palatini (papal palace judges) were the highest administrative officers of the pope's household; with the growth of the temporal power of the popes they acquired great importance. These judices palatini were

- chief were the primicerius notariorum and secundarius notariorum, the two superintendents of the papal notarii (notaries), who superintended the preparation of official documents, conducted judicial investigations and exercised jurisdiction in legal matters voluntarily submitted by the interested parties to the papal court; they were the highest officers of the papal Chancery and of the archives of the Lateran Palace.
- the nomenculator or adminiculator (originally perhaps two distinct officials), who took charge of, and decided upon, petitions to the pope. (The nomenculator was superseded in the course of the ninth century by the protoscriniarius, or superintendent of the Roman public schools for scribes.)
- The arcarius and sacellarius were the highest financial officers, custodians of the treasures of the pope's Lateran Palace, who had charge of the receipt and payment of moneys. The vestararius was the third financial office.
- The primicerius defensorum and secundicerius defensorum, being superintendents of the defensores, who aided and protected widows, orphans, captives and other needy persons, had the supervision of charitable institutions.

These various offices developed from the end of the fourth century, with the formation of the papal household. Their functions covered the whole central administration of the papacy, both at Rome and in the outlying possessions (patrimonia) of the Roman Church. The judices palatini were also employed as papal envoys; they also had definite duties in the solemn processions and other great church ceremonies at which the pope was present in person. Their authority continued down until the middle of the eleventh century, when the reforms of the papal administration, inaugurated after the troubles of the tenth century, placed the Cardinals in that position at the Roman curia, which the judices palatini had previously occupied, and the latter gradually disappeared.

== Later papal palatini ==
In later times, the designation palatini was borne by certain cardinals, whose position brought them into constant relation with the pope, and who resided in the papal palace, and by the highest prelates of the pope's personal suite.

For long the cardinales palatini were: the cardinal prodatary, the Cardinal Secretary of State, the Cardinal Secretary of Briefs and the Cardinal Secretary of Memorials. Pope Pius X (1903–1914) abolished the two last-mentioned positions, and Pope Paul VI abolished the Apostolic Dataria in 1967.

The praelati palatini were:

- the majordomo (maggiordomo)
- the high chamberlain (maestro di camera)
- the auditor of the pope (uditore santissimo)
- the pope's theologian (maestro del sacro palazzo), who is always a Dominican.

== Lay counterparts ==
- In the times of the French kings and of the German emperors, there were comites palatini, counts palatine who originally presided in the High Courts of Justice of a palatinate as representatives of the Crown.
- In Germany, the counts palatine were entrusted, after Otto I (931–73), with the supervision of the imperial lands and revenues, and were also imperial judges. The court officials bearing this title, introduced by Emperor Charles IV (1346–78), had various powers, partly judicial, partly administrative.
- In medieval Poland, a Palatyn (Palatinus) was initially the highest title at the King's court. Later, every local Prince had his own Palatinus, often the actual ruler of a Duchy. With the partial reunification of the Kingdom, the ducal Palatini remained in their place and ruled the Principalities (later renamed to Palatinates, Palatinatus) under the King. The title got merged with that of Wojewoda (Dux Exercituum, Herzog). A son of a Palatinus was titled Wojewodzic (Palatinida) and would often become a Palatinus at his father's death, but these titles never became officially hereditary and formally remained granted for lifetime by the King. In the early 20th century, the palatinal families (rodziny wojewodzińskie, descendants of the Palatini), remained the highest strata of Poland's aristocracy.
