= Palatine =

High-level official attached to imperial or royal courts in Europe since Roman times

A palatine, or palatinus (Latin; pl.: palatini; cf. derivative spellings below), is a high-level official attached to imperial or royal courts in Europe since Roman times. The term palatinus was first used in Ancient Rome for chamberlains of the Emperor due to their association with the Palatine Hill. The imperial palace guard, after the rise of Constantine I, were also called the Scholae Palatinae for the same reason. In the Early Middle Ages the title became attached to courts beyond the imperial one; one of the highest level of officials in the papal administration were called the judices palatini. Later the Merovingian and Carolingian dynasties had counts palatine, as did the Holy Roman Empire. Related titles were used in Hungary, Poland, Lithuania, the German Empire, and the County of Burgundy, while England, Ireland, and parts of British North America referred to rulers of counties palatine as palatines.

== Derivative terms ==
The different spellings originate from the different languages that used the title throughout the ages (a phenomenon called lenition). The word "palatine" evolved from the Latin word palatinus, asserting a connection to the Palatine Hill, where the house of the Roman emperor was situated since Augustus (hence "palace"). The meaning of the term hardly changed, since Latin was the dominant language in medieval writing. But its spelling slightly changed in European languages: Latin palatinus, plural palatini was still an office in Merovingian times, today referred to as the Count Palatine. The word became in French palaisin, and with the Norman dynasty entered the English language as palatine. The word paladin, referring to one of the legendary Twelve Peers of Charlemagne in the Matter of France, is also related.

The word palatinus and its derivatives also translate the titles of certain great functionaries in eastern Europe, such as the Slavic voivode, a military governor of a province. In Poland the title of Palatyn (Comes Palatinus) has merged with that of Wojewoda (Dux Exercituum).

== History ==
=== Ancient Rome: palatinus ===
Official and ceremonial hat of the Salii and Flamines.

The members of the Imperial Guard were named after Palatine Hill, the mythical founding place of Rome. On the same hill lived the members of the older of two schools of the ancient Salii brotherhood of God of War Mars, which had some symbolism in common with that of the imperial palace. Military training schools were the scholae, and the Imperial Guard was called Scholae Palatinae. It was a personal army that the emperor was allowed to use personally on campaigns.

=== Holy Roman Empire: comes palatinus ===
From the Middle Ages on, the term palatine was applied to various officials across Europe. The most important of these was the comes palatinus, the count palatine, who in Merovingian and Carolingian times (5th through 10th century) was an official of the sovereign's household, in particular of his court of law in the imperial palaces (see kaiserpfalz). The count palatine was the official representative at proceedings of the court such as oath takings or judicial sentences and was in charge of the records of those developments. At first he examined cases in the king's court and was authorized to carry out the decisions, in time, these rights extended to having his own judicial rights. In addition to those responsibilities, the count palatine had administrative functions, especially concerning the king's household.

In the 9th century Carolingian rule came to an end and the title of Holy Roman emperor with it. About a century later the title was resurrected by Otto I though the new empire was now centered on Germany rather than France. Under the German kings of the Saxon and Salian dynasties (10th to 12th century), the function of the counts palatine corresponded to those of the missi dominici at the Carolingian Court. They had various tasks: representatives of the king in the provinces, they were responsible for the administration of the royal domain and for protecting and guiding the legal system in certain duchies, such as Saxony and Bavaria, and, in particular, Lotharingia. Later other palatine rights were absorbed by ducal dynasties, by local families, or, in Italy, by bishops. Increasingly, the count palatine of Lotharingia, whose office had been attached to the royal palace at Aachen from the 10th century onward, became the real successor to the Carolingian count palatine. From his office grew the Countship Palatine of the Rhine, or simply the Palatinate, which became a great territorial power from the time of the emperor Frederick I (Barbarossa) (d. 1190) on. The term palatine reoccurs under Charles IV, but they had only voluntary jurisdiction and some honorific functions.

=== Papal States: judices palatini ===
In the Middle Ages, the judices palatini (papal palace judges) were the highest administrative officers of the pope's household.

=== Modern era ===
In Early Modern Britain, the term palatinate, or county palatine, was also applied to counties of lords who could exercise powers normally reserved to the crown. Likewise, there were palatine provinces among the English colonies in North America: Cecilius Calvert, 2nd Baron Baltimore, was granted palatine rights in Maryland in 1632, as were the proprietors of the Carolinas in 1663. And although with tongue in cheek, legal historian John Phillip Reid once asked if the Hudson's Bay Company jurisdiction of "Rupert's Land can be analogized to a county palatine". His question is yet to receive serious scholarly attention.

In 19th-century Germany, Paladin was an official rank and considered an honorary title for a man in the service of his emperor. It was a knight with additional honors, they were entitled to exercise powers normally reserved to the crown. In Nazi Germany, Hermann Göring was also given the title "Paladin", referring to the tradition of a title that made the bearer second to the monarch.

== See also ==
- County Palatine of Cephalonia and Zakynthos
- Electoral Palatinate
- German Palatines
- Palatine (Kingdom of Hungary)
- Palatinate (region)
- Rhineland-Palatinate
- Upper Palatinate
