= Vestararius =

Roman Curia official

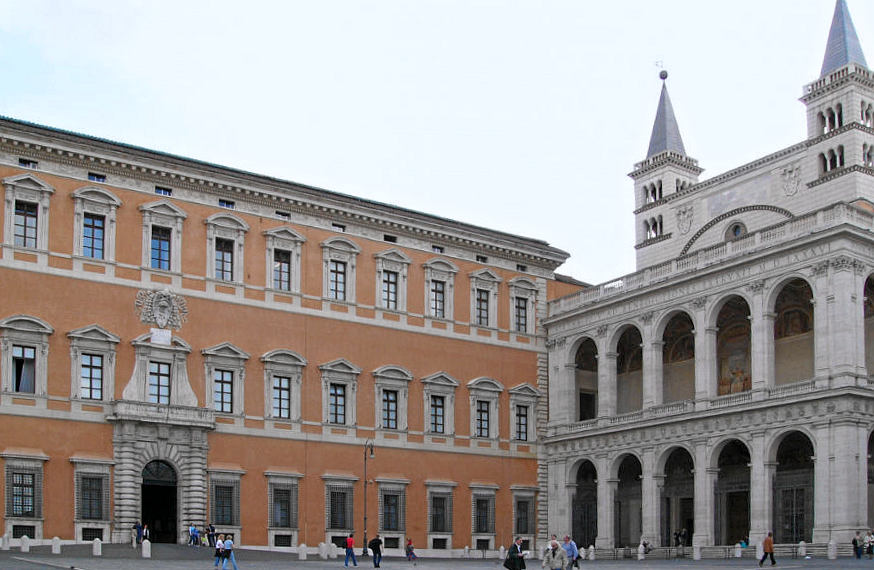
The Lateran Palace, the seat of the vestararius

The vestararius was the manager of the medieval Roman Curia office of the vestiarium (cf. the Byzantine imperial wardrobe and treasury, the vestiarion), responsible for the management of papal finances as well as the papal wardrobe. The vestiarium is mentioned as the papal treasury as early as the seventh century, during the period of Byzantine cultural hegemony in the West called the "Byzantine Papacy", but the vestararius itself is attested to only from the eighth century.

Along with the highest financial officers arcarius and the sacellarius, the vestararius was one of the three most important staff officials of the Lateran Palace (the palatini). By the ninth century, the vestararius was a member of the papal household second only to the seven judges, while the other two offices figured among the "seven judges of the palace" who constituted the core of the papal court. While the other offices were responsible for the collection and dispensation of papal assets, respectively, the vestararius was responsible for guarding the wealth, possibly depositing in the wardrobe along with the papal vestiments. The vestararius was also responsible for the written financial archives and accounts, and may have received and distributed some sums independently of the other offices.

By 813, the vestararius was seated beside the pope in the Palace in giving judgement and in 875 was sent as an embassy to the Holy Roman Emperor. Theophylact I, Count of Tusculum, who for all intents and purposes ran the temporal affairs of the papacy during the saeculum obscurum of the first half of the tenth century, was a holder of the office of vestararius. His wife, Theodora, held the extraordinary position of vestararissa.

The financial administration of the papacy as a whole began to be referred to as a camera in 1017, but the name change may not have been of any real significance. The last known reference to the office of vestararius appears in 1033. There is no concrete evidence of continuity between the vestararius and the camerarius, which is referred to for the first time in 1099, although their functions are nearly the same. Either office (or both) may have existed during this period, or the responsibilities may have fallen to some third office, often hypothesized to have been filled by Hildebrand.
