= Pope Benedict IX =

Head of the Catholic Church variously from 1032 to 1048

- Bishop of Rome
- Church: Catholic Church
- Papacy began: October 1032 (first time); 10 March 1045 (second time); 8 November 1047 (third time)
- Papacy ended: 20 January 1045 (first time); 1 May 1045 (second time); 17 July 1048 (third time)
- Predecessor: John XIX (1032); Sylvester III (1045); Clement II (1047)
- Successor: Sylvester III (1044); Gregory VI (1045); Damasus II (1048)

Personal details
- Born: Theophylact of Tusculum (Italian: Teofilatto di Toscolo) c. 1012 Rome, Papal States
- Died: c. December 1055/January 1056 (aged 43-44) Grottaferrata, Papal States

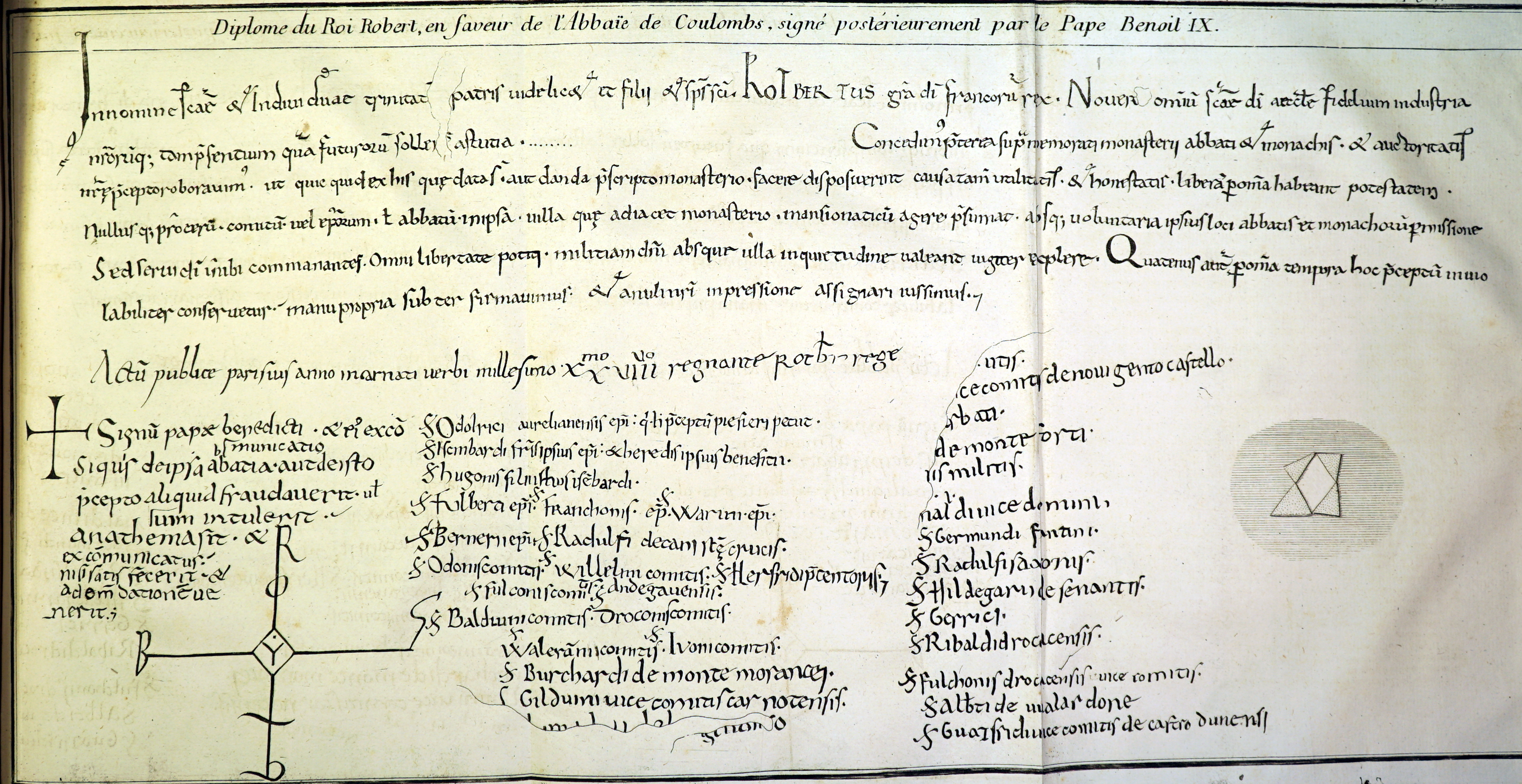
Grant of Robert II of France in favour of Abbaye Notre-Dame de Coulombs (Coulombs, Eure-et-Loir), also signed by Benedict IX

Pope Benedict IX (Latin: Benedictus IX; c. 1012 – c. 1056), born Theophylact of Tusculum in Rome, was the bishop of Rome and ruler of the Papal States for three periods between October 1032 and July 1048 (1032–1044; 1045; 1047–1048). Aged about 20 when first elected, he may have been the youngest pope in the history of the Catholic Church. He is the only person to have been pope more than once (Note: John XII was deposed invalidly by Emperor Otto the Great and replaced for a few months by antipope Leo VIII (who later became a legitimate pope after Benedict V accepted his own deposition).) and the only person ever accused of selling the papacy.

Benedict was the nephew of his two immediate predecessors, Benedict VIII and John XIX. In October 1032, Benedict's father obtained his election through bribery. However, his reputedly dissolute activities provoked a revolt on the part of the Romans. Benedict was driven out of Rome and Sylvester III elected to succeed him. Some months later, Benedict and his supporters managed to expel Sylvester. Benedict then decided to resign in favor of his godfather, Gregory VI, provided he was reimbursed for his expenses.

Benedict subsequently had second thoughts, returned, and attempted to depose Gregory VI. A number of prominent clergymen appealed to Henry III, King of the Romans, to restore order. Henry and his forces crossed the Brenner Pass into Italy, where he summoned the Council of Sutri to decide the matter. Benedict IX, Sylvester III, and Gregory VI were all deposed. Henry then had Clement II elected in December 1046.

== Early life ==
Benedict was the youngest son of Count Alberic III of Tusculum and his wife Ermelina. He was closely related to several popes, being a nephew of Benedict VIII and John XIX, grandnephew of John XII, great-grandnephew of John XI, first cousin twice removed of Benedict VII, and possibly a distant relative of Sergius III. His father obtained the papal chair for him by bribing the Romans.

Benedict IX was about twenty when made pontiff in October 1032. Other sources state that he was 11 or 12, based upon the unsubstantiated testimony of Rodulfus Glaber, a monk of St. Germanus at Auxerre. If Glaber was correct, Benedict IX was the youngest Pope in history. If he was incorrect, that honor may belong to Pope John XII, who was between the ages of 17 and 25 when he was elected.

=== Family tree ===
Theophylact I, Count of Tusculum	Theodora
Hugh of Italy	Marozia
Alda of Vienne	Alberic II of Spoleto; 905–954	Pope John XI r. 931–935	David or Deodatus
Pope John XII r. 955–964	Gregory I, Count of Tusculum	Pope Benedict VII r. 974–983
Pope Benedict VIII r. 1012–1024	Alberic III, Count of Tusculum	Pope John XIX r. 1024–1032
Peter, Duke of the Romans	Pope Benedict IX r. 1032–1044, 1045, 1047–1048

== First pontificate (1032–1044) ==
Benedict IX's reign was judicated scandalous, and factional strife continued. Ferdinand Gregorovius, wrote that in Benedict, "It seemed as if a demon from hell, in the disguise of a priest, occupied the chair of Peter and profaned the sacred mysteries of religion by his insolent courses." Horace K. Mann called him "a disgrace to the Chair of Peter". Pope Victor III, in his third book of Dialogues, referred to "his rapes, murders and other unspeakable acts of violence and sodomy. His life as a pope was so vile, so foul, so execrable, that I shudder to think of it."

According to Reginald Lane Poole, "In a time of acute political hostility, accusations, as we know too well, are made and are believed, which in a calmer time would never have been suggested." He further suggests the credibility of such accusations was determined by probability rather than proof, and a reaction to the Tusculan hegemony. Poole observes that "we have to wait until he had discredited himself by his sale of the Papacy before we hear anything definite about his misdeeds; and the further we go in time and place, the worse his character becomes". Poole considers Benedict "a negligent Pope, very likely a profligate man", but notes that the picture presented of Benedict is drawn at a time when the party opposed to him was in the ascendant, and he had neither friends nor supporters.

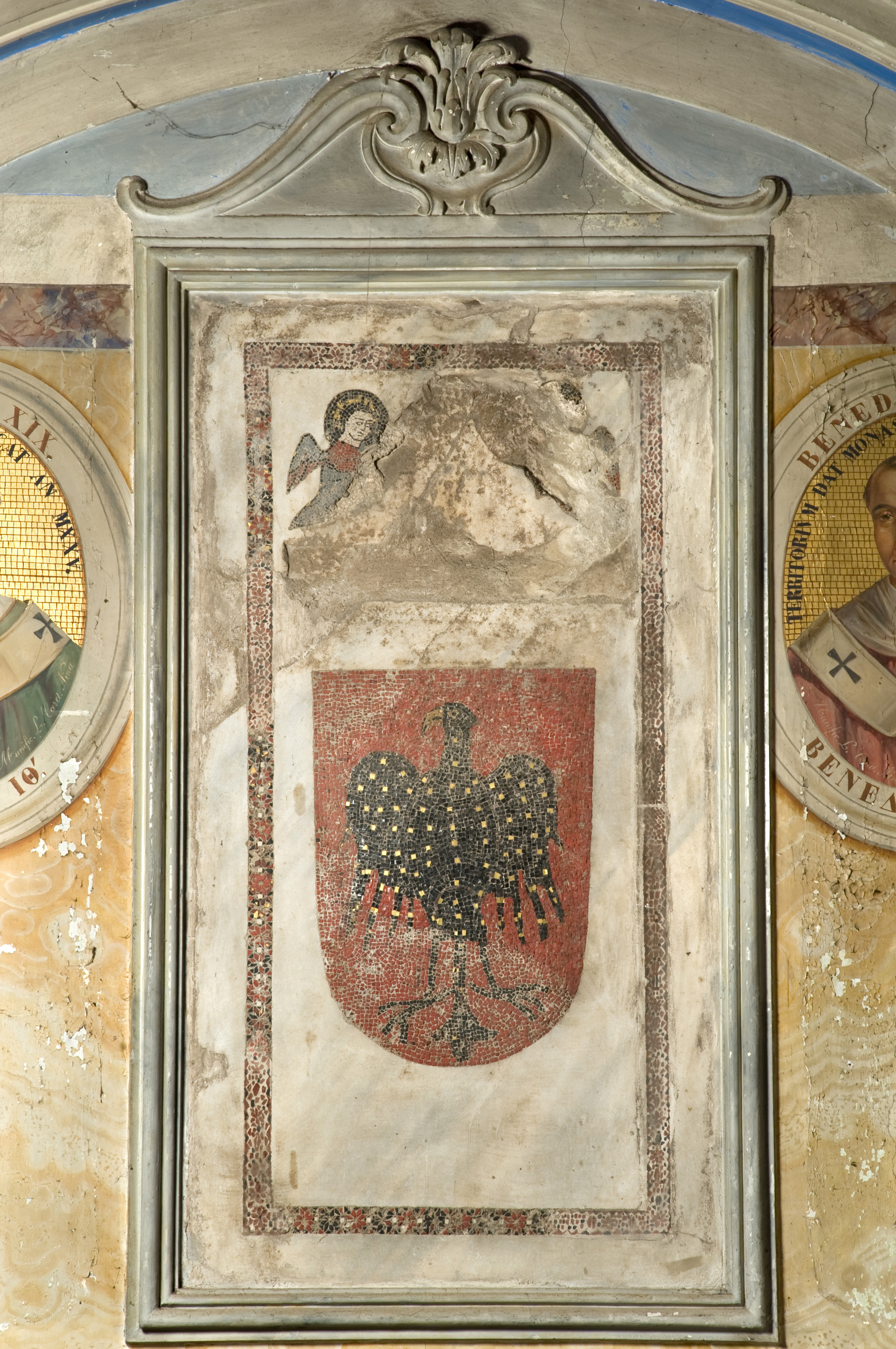
Gravestone of Benedict IX, located at the Abbey of Grottaferrata

Pope Benedict IX was briefly forced out of Rome in 1036, but returned with the help of Emperor Conrad II, who had expelled the bishops of Piacenza and Cremona from their sees. Bishop Benno of Piacenza accused Benedict of "many vile adulteries and murders". He was accused by Peter Damian in his Liber Gomorrhianus of routine sodomy and bestiality and sponsoring orgies. In September 1044, opposition to Benedict IX's dissolute lifestyle forced him out of the city again and elected Sylvester III to replace him.

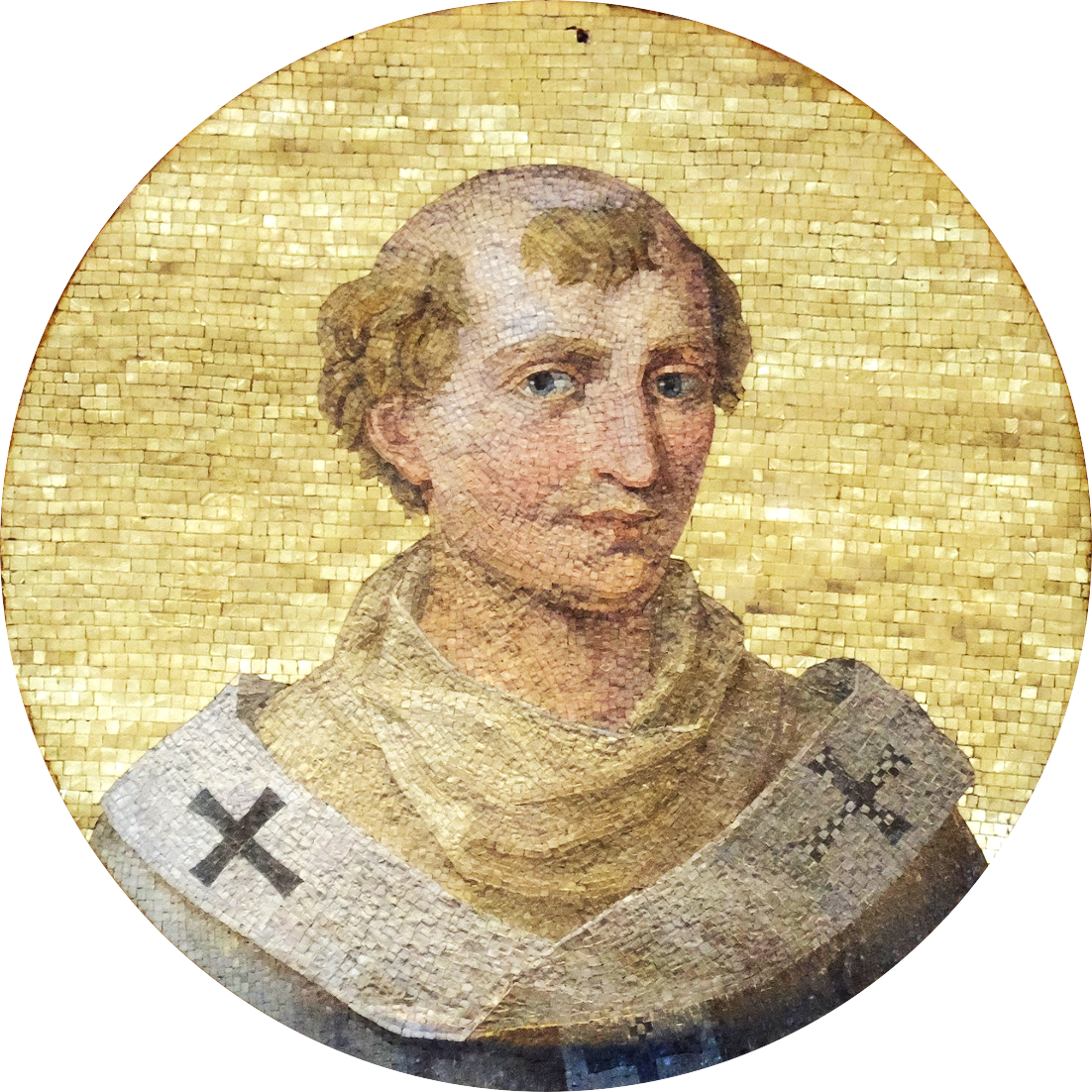
Portrait of Pope Benedict IX in the Basilica of Saint Paul Outside the Walls, Rome

== Second pontificate (1045) ==
Benedict IX's forces returned in April 1045 and expelled his rival, allowing Benedict to resume the papacy. Doubting his own ability to maintain his position, and wishing to marry his cousin, Benedict decided to resign in May 1045. He consulted his godfather, the pious priest John Gratian, about the possibility of resigning. He offered to give up the papacy into the hands of his godfather if he would reimburse him for his election expenses. John Gratian paid him the money and was recognized as pope in his stead, as Gregory VI. Peter Damian hailed the change with joy and wrote to the new pope, urging him to deal with the scandals of the church in Italy, singling out the wicked bishops of Pesaro, of Città di Castello and of Fano.

== Third pontificate (1047–1048) ==
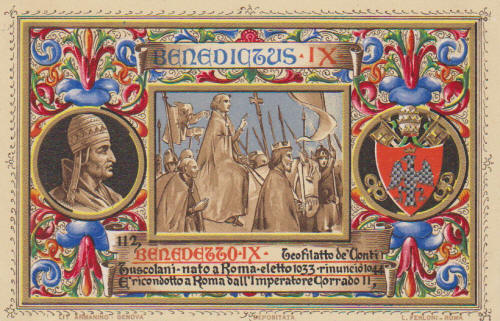
19th-century religious card depicting Benedict IX

Benedict IX soon regretted his resignation and returned to Rome, taking the city and remaining on the throne until July 1046, although Gregory VI continued to be recognized as the true pope. At the time, Sylvester III also reasserted his claim. A number of influential clergy and laity besought Emperor Henry III to cross the Alps and restore order. Henry intervened, and at the Council of Sutri in December 1046, Benedict IX and Sylvester III were declared deposed while Gregory VI was encouraged to resign because the arrangement he had entered into with Benedict was considered simoniacal; that is, to have been paid for. A German, Clement II, was chosen to succeed Gregory VI. Benedict IX had not attended the council and did not accept his deposition.

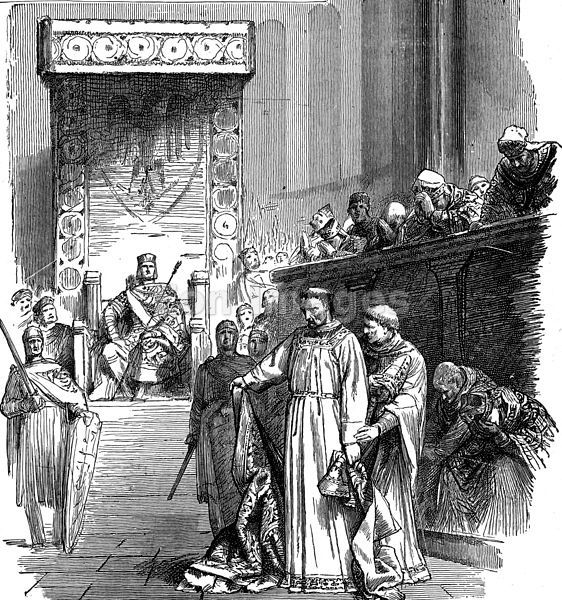
19th-century illustration of the Council of Sutri

When Clement II died in October 1047, Benedict seized the Lateran Palace in November, again becoming pope, but was driven away by German troops in July 1048. To fill the power vacuum, the German-born Damasus II was elected pope and universally recognized as such. Benedict IX refused to appear on charges of simony in 1049 and was excommunicated.

Benedict IX's eventual fate is obscure, but he seems to have given up his claims to the papal throne. Leo IX may have lifted the ban on him. Benedict IX was buried in the Abbey of Grottaferrata c. 1056. According to the abbot, Saint Bartholomew of Grottaferrata, he was penitent and turned away from the sins he committed as pontiff.

== See also ==
- Liber Gomorrhianus
- List of sexually active popes
- The Bad Popes

== Sources ==
- Pham, John-Peter (2004). Heirs of the Fisherman : Behind the Scenes of Papal Death and Succession. Oxford University Press.

Catholic Church titles
Preceded by John XIX	Pope; 1032–1044	Succeeded by Sylvester III
Preceded by Sylvester III	Pope; 1045	Succeeded by Gregory VI
Preceded by Clement II	Pope; 1047–1048	Succeeded by Damasus II
