= Theodora (senatrix) =

Papal mistress (c. 870 – 916)

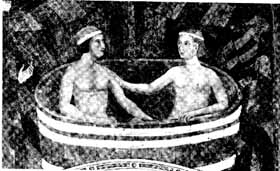
Theodora and Marozia

Theodora (also Teodora) (c. 870 – 916) was a senatrix and serenissima vestaratrix of Rome. Theodora, a Byzantine princess, was married to Theophylact I, Count of Tusculum, of the incredibly powerful Theophylact family. Theophylact I was appointed both commander of the Roman militia and head of the papal chapel. The couple shared effective rulership of Rome between 905 and her death in 916.

As heads of the most powerful family in Rome, Theodora and her husband held great sway over the papacy. Liutprand of Cremona, a critic of Theodora and her family, claimed that Pope John X rose to the papacy due to him being the lover of Theodora. Liutprand called her a "shameless harlot".

With her husband Theophylact I, Theodora had at least three children: Marozia, Theodora II, and Sergia. Her daughters Marozia and Theodora II adopted the title senatrix omnium Romanorum. Alberic II of Spoleto was her grandson and he ruled over Rome from 932 to 954.

Her daughter, Marozia, was the alleged lover of Pope Sergius III, and mother of Pope John XI. The latter, according to Liutprand of Cremona and the Liber Pontificalis, was fathered by Sergius. However, the annalist Flodoard (c. 894–966), a direct contemporary of Theodora's, says John XI was the brother of Count Alberic II of Spoleto. Because Alberic II was Marozia's son by her husband Count Alberic I of Spoleto, John was likely the son of Marozia and Alberic I.

Theodora was characterized by the aforementioned Liutprand as a "shameless whore ... [who] exercised power on the Roman citizenry like a man". Liutprand, a bishop of Cremona, was known to his contemporaries and modern historians as being unfair to adversaries.

== Works cited ==
- Osborne, John (2025). Rome in the Tenth Century: A History in Art. Cambridge University Press. ISBN 9781009639705.
