= Pope Clement II =

Head of the Catholic Church from 1046 to 1047

- Bishop of Rome
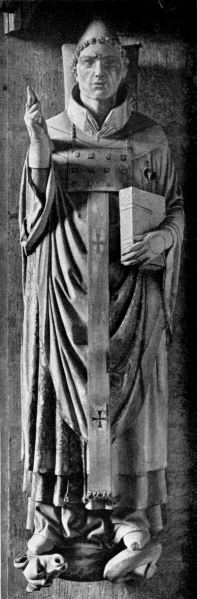
- Tomb effigy in Bamberg Cathedral, erected c. 1237
- Church: Catholic Church
- Papacy began: 25 December 1046
- Papacy ended: 9 October 1047
- Predecessor: Gregory VI
- Successor: Benedict IX

Personal details
- Born: Suidger von Morsleben-Horneburg Hornburg, Eastphalia, Duchy of Saxony, Holy Roman Empire
- Died: 9 October 1047 Pesaro, Papal States
- Buried: Bamberg Cathedral, Bamberg, Germany

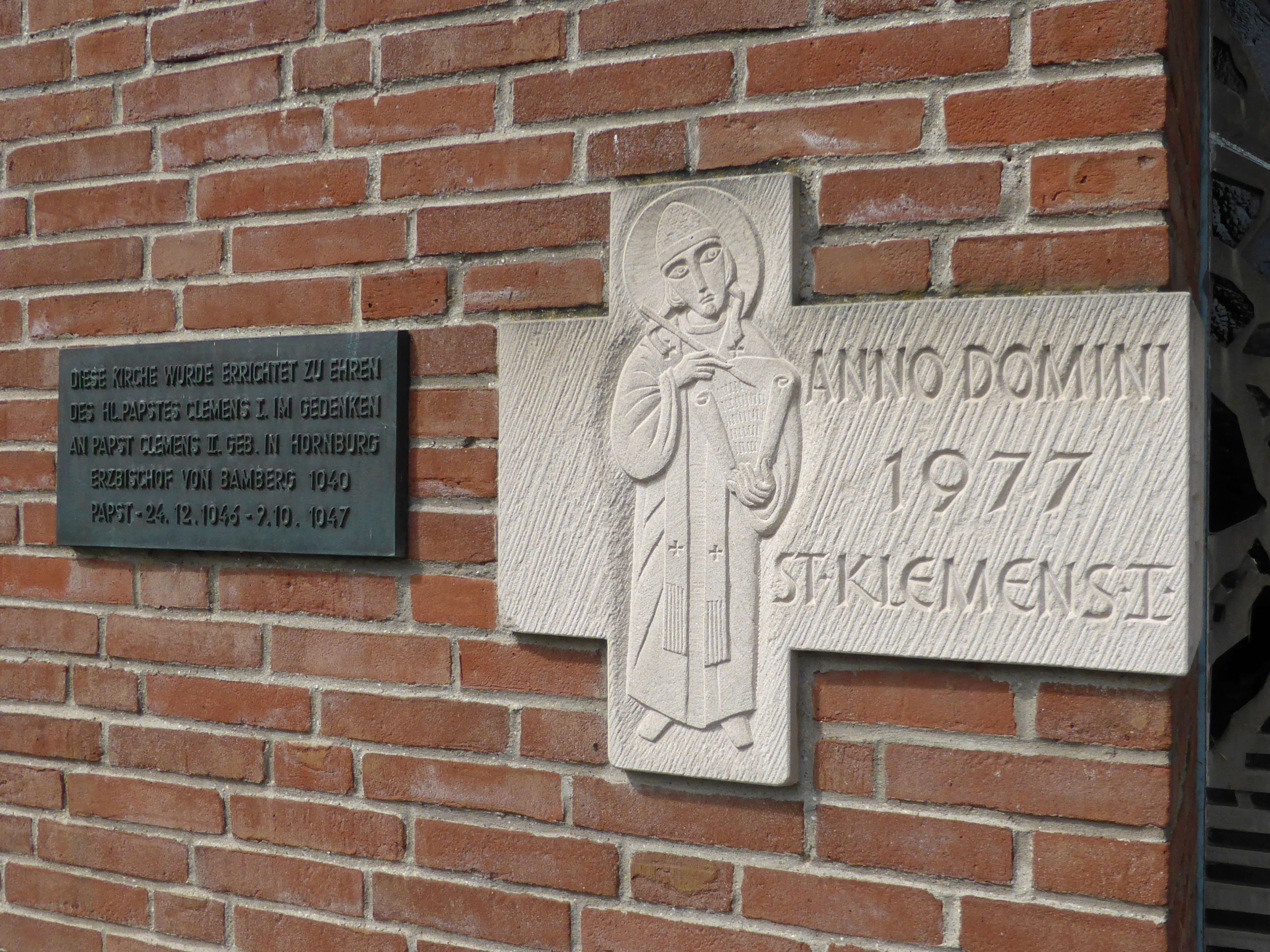
Sculpture at St Clement's church, Hornburg

Pope Clement II (Latin: Clemens II; born Suidger von Morsleben-Horneburg; died 9 October 1047) was head of the Catholic Church and ruler of the Papal States from 25 December 1046 until his death in 1047.

He was the first in a series of reform-minded popes from Germany. Suidger was the bishop of Bamberg. In 1046, he accompanied King Henry III of Germany, when at the request of laity and clergy of Rome, Henry went to Italy and summoned the Council of Sutri, which deposed Benedict IX and Sylvester III, and accepted the resignation of Gregory VI. Henry suggested Suidger as the next pope, and he was then elected, taking the name of Clement II. Clement then proceeded to crown Henry as emperor. Clement's brief tenure as pope saw the enactment of more stringent prohibitions against simony.

== Early career ==
Born in Hornburg, Duchy of Saxony, in what is now Lower Saxony, Germany, he was the son of Count Konrad von Morsleben-Horneburg and his wife, Amulrad von Meyendorf. In 1040, he became Bishop of Bamberg.

In the autumn of 1046, there were three rival claimants to the papacy, in St. Peter's, the Lateran, and St. Mary Major's. Two of them, Benedict IX and Sylvester III, represented rival factions of the nobility. The third, Pope Gregory VI, in order to free the city from the House of Tusculum, and Benedict's scandalous lifestyle, had paid Benedict money in exchange for his resignation. Regardless of the motives, the transaction bore the appearance of simony. Questions regarding the legitimacy of any of them could undermine the validity of a coronation of Henry as Holy Roman Emperor. King Henry crossed the Alps at the head of a large army and accompanied by a retinue of the secular and ecclesiastical princes of the empire, for the twofold purpose of receiving the imperial crown and of restoring order.

== Papacy ==
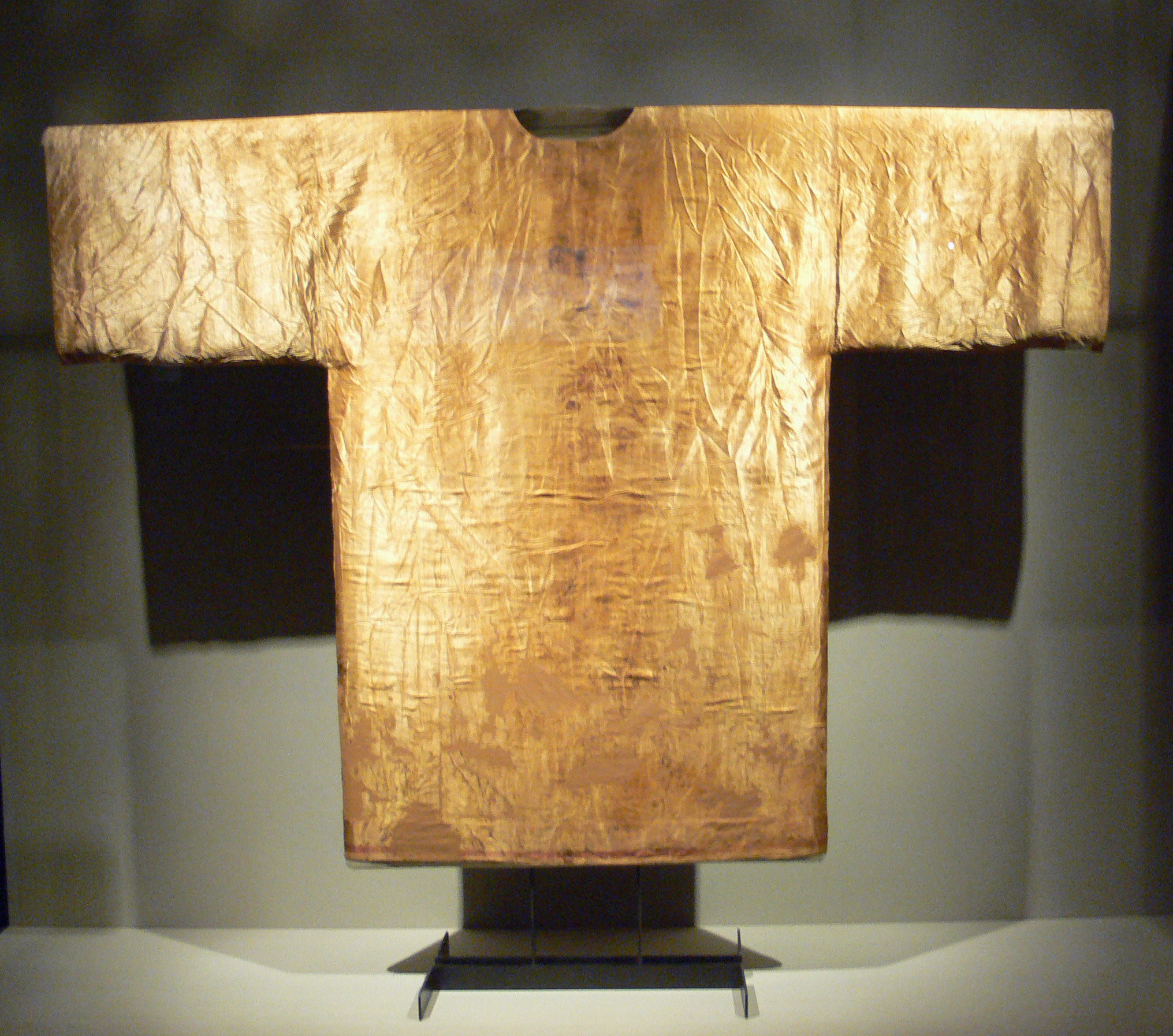
Robes belonging to Clement II in the Bamberg Diocesan Museum

In 1046, Suidger accompanied King Henry on his campaign to Italy and in December, participated in the Council of Sutri, which deposed former Benedict IX and Sylvester III and persuaded Gregory VI to resign. Henry nominated Suidger for the papacy and the council elected him, making him the first pope placed on the throne by the power of the German emperors. Suidger insisted upon retaining the bishopric of his see, partly for needed financial support, and partly lest the turbulent Romans should before long send him back to Bamberg. Suidger took the name Clement II. Immediately after his election, Henry and the new pope travelled to Rome, where Clement was enthroned. He then crowned Henry III as emperor of the Holy Roman Empire.

Clement's election as pope was later criticized by the reform party within the papal curia due to the royal involvement and the fact that the new bishop of Rome was already bishop of another diocese. Contrary to later practice, Clement kept his old see, governing both Rome and Bamberg simultaneously. Clement's first pontifical act was to crown Henry and Agnes of Poitou. He bestowed on the Emperor the title and diadem of a Roman patrician, a dignity which was commonly understood to give the bearer the right of indicating the person to be chosen pope.

Clement II's short pontificate, starting with the Roman synod of 1047, initiated an improvement in the state of affairs within the Roman Church, particularly by enacting decrees against simony. A dispute for precedence among the Sees of Ravenna, Milan, and Aquileia was settled in favour of Ravenna.

== Death ==
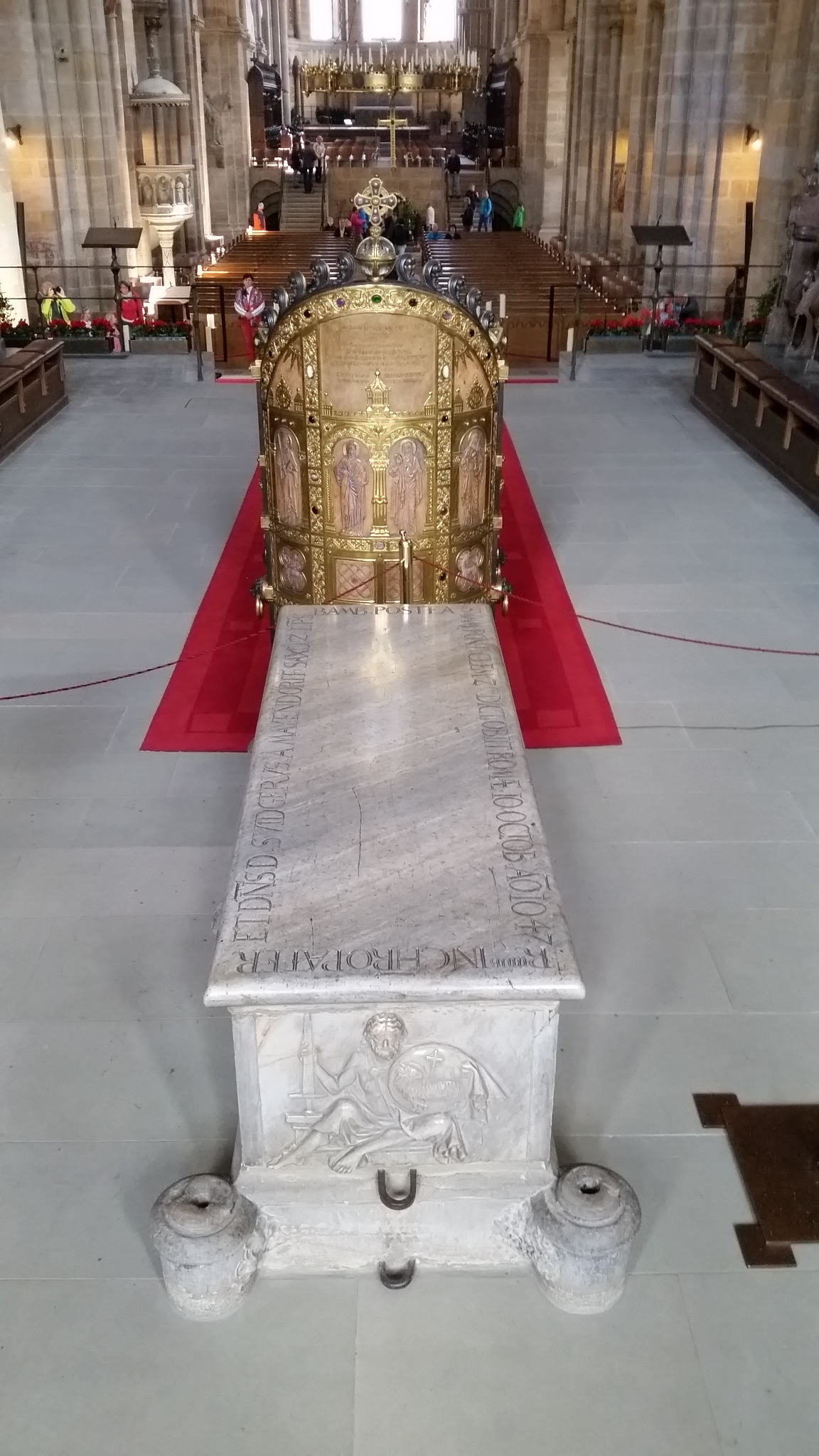
Grave of Clement II, Bamberg Cathedral

Clement accompanied Henry III in triumphal progress through southern Italy and placed Benevento under an interdict for refusing to open its gates to them. Proceeding with Henry to Germany, he canonized Wiborada, a nun of St. Gall, martyred by the Hungarians in 925. On his way back to Rome, he died near Pesaro on 9 October 1047. His corpse was transferred back to Bamberg, which he had loved dearly, and interred in the western choir of the Bamberg Cathedral. His is the only tomb of a pope north of the Alps.

A toxicologic examination of his remains in the mid-20th century confirmed centuries-old rumors that the pope had been poisoned with lead sugar. It is not clear, however, whether he was murdered or whether the lead sugar was used as medicine.

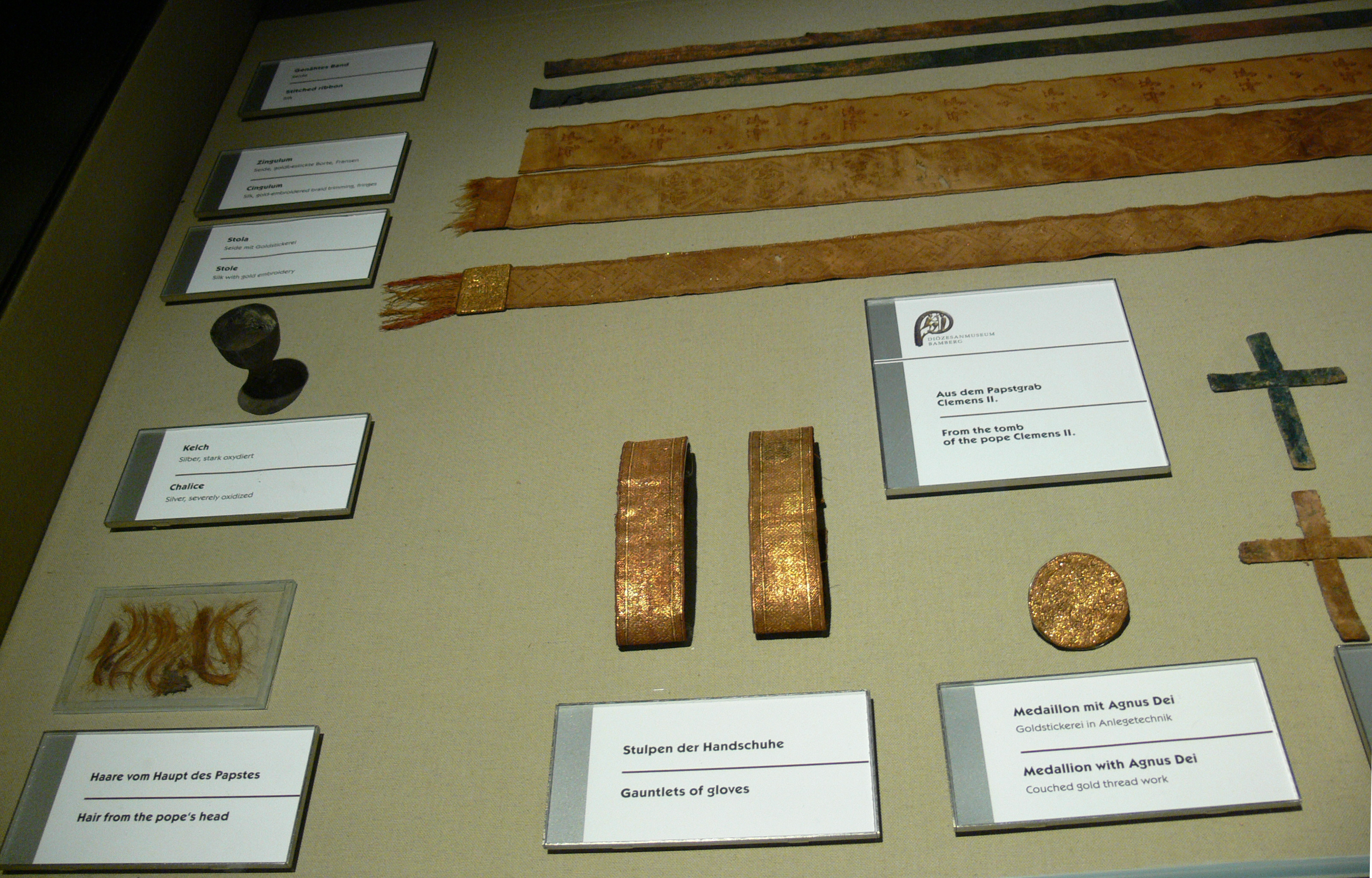
Artifacts from Clement's grave in the diocesan museum: hair, chalice, gauntlets, medallion

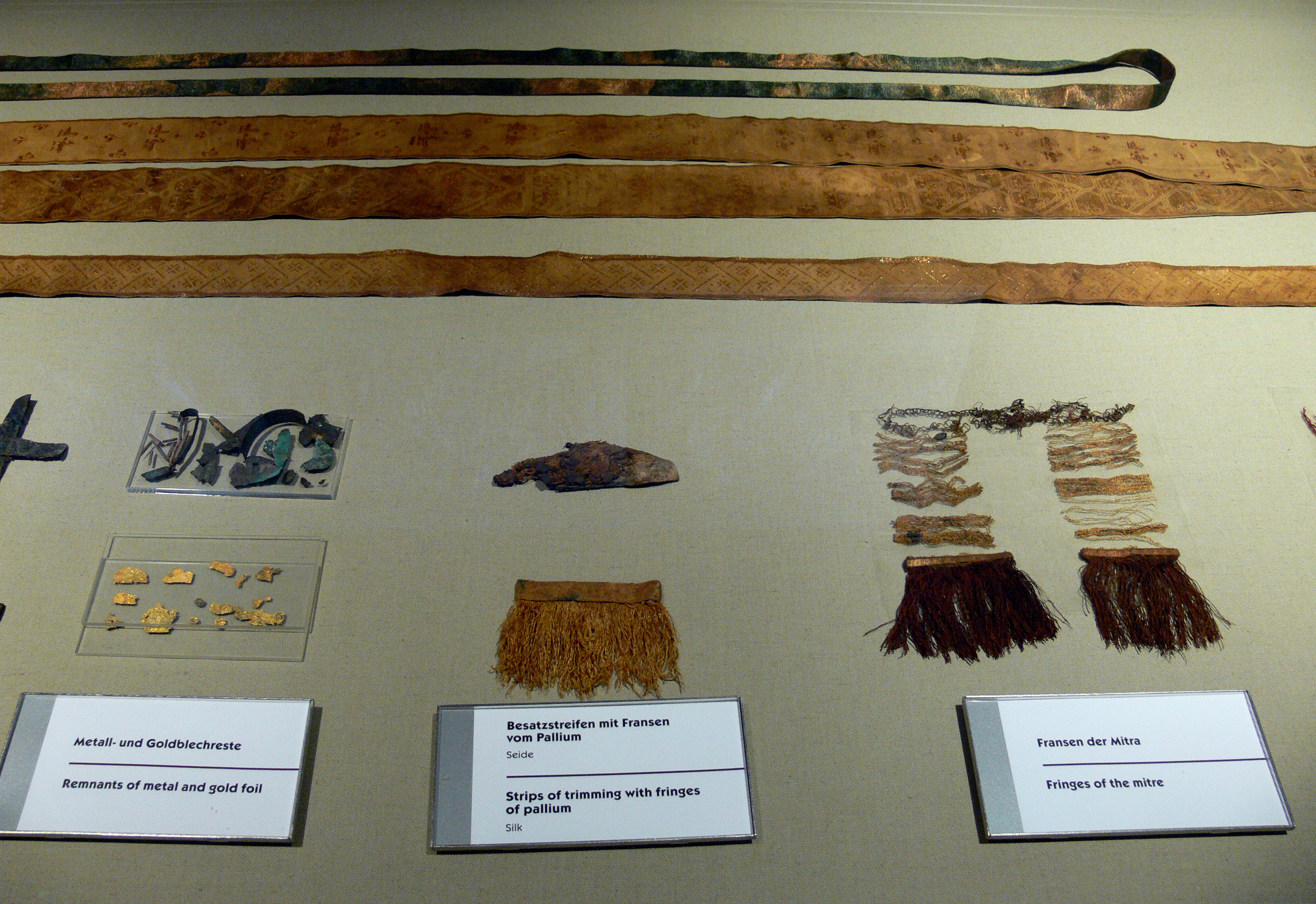
Fabrics

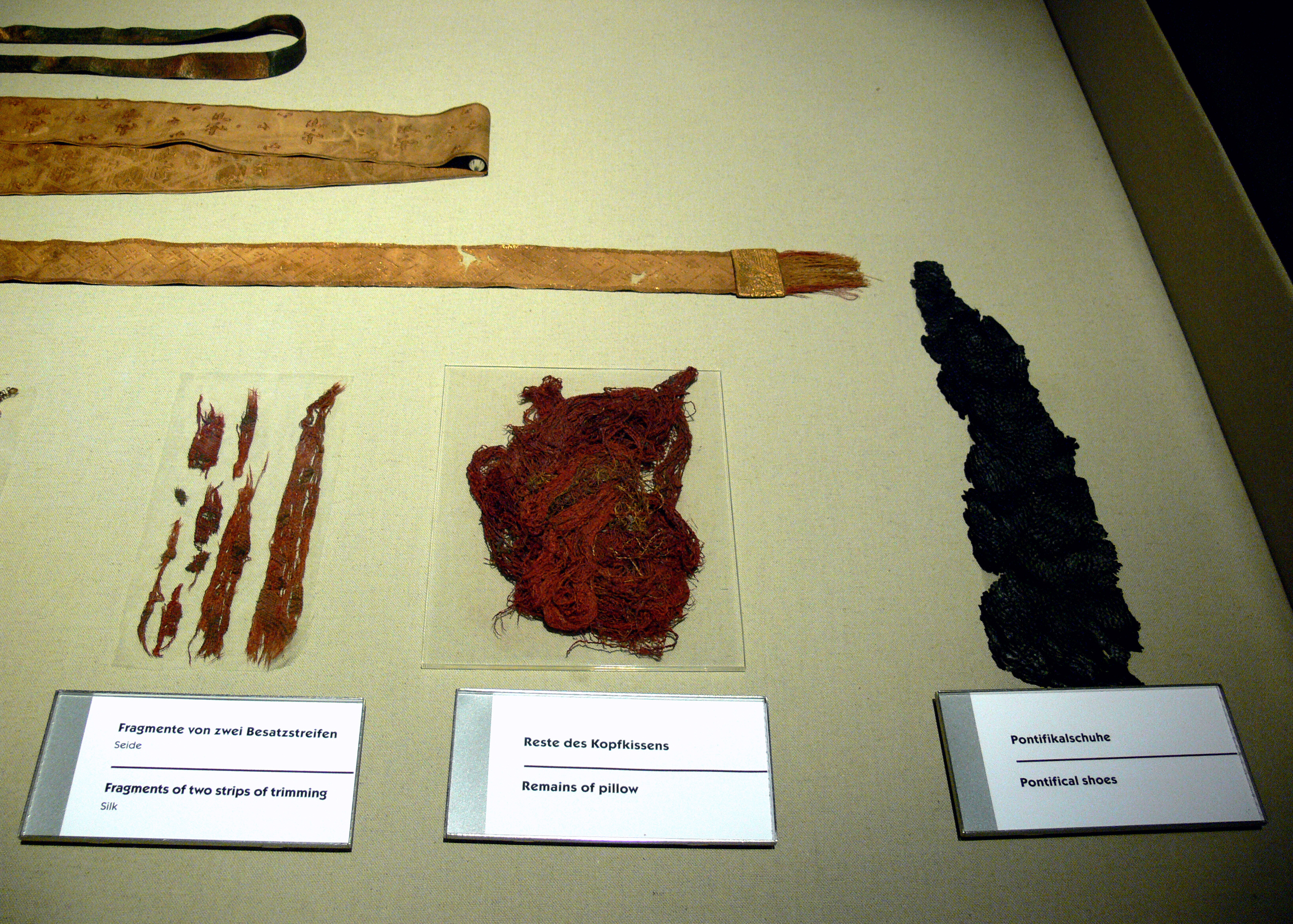
Fabrics and shoe remnants

== Bibliography ==
- Dechant, Alfons; Göller, Luitgar (1997). Clemens II., der Papst aus Bamberg: 24 Dezember 1046 – 9 Oktober 1047 (in German). Bamberg: St.-Otto-Verlag. ISBN 978-3876930787.
- Dolley, M. (1969). "Some Neglected Evidence from Irish Chronicles Concerning the Alleged Poisoning of Pope Clement II," Frühmittelalterliche Studien 3, 1969, pp. 343–346.
- Gresser, Georg (2007). Clemens II.: der erste deutsche Reformpapst (in German). Paderborn: Schöningh. ISBN 978-3506763297.
- Mann, Horace K. (1902). The lives of the Popes in the Early Middle Ages Volume V (London, K. Paul, Trench, Trübner, & co.), pp. 270–285.
- Migne, J.-P., ed. (1880). Patrologiae cursus completus, Series Latina (in Latin). Vol. Tomus CXLII (142). Paris: apud Garnier fratres, apud J.-P. Migne. pp. 577–590.
- Timmel, R. (1982). "Bischof Suidger von Bamberg – Papst Clemens II., † 1047," Fränkische Lebensbilder 10, 1982, pp. 1–19.
- Zimmermann, G. (1980). "Bischof Suidger von Bamberg – Papst Clemens II.," in: Sorge um den Menschen. Festschrift zum 25jährigen Bischofsjubiläum von Alterzbischof Joseph Schneider, (ed. H.G. Röhrig) Bamberg 1980, pp. 125–135.

Catholic Church titles
Preceded by Gregory VI	Pope; 1046–1047	Succeeded by Benedict IX
