= Council of Sutri =

1046 synod that appointed Pope Clement II

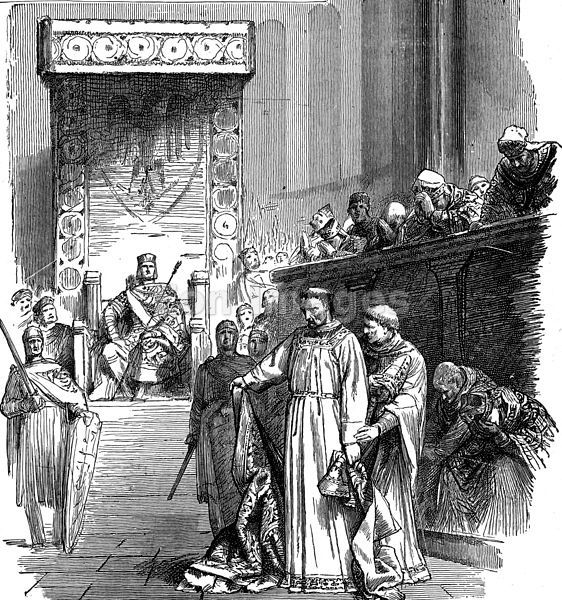
Henry III at the Council of Sutri (drawing)

The Council of Sutri (or Synod of Sutri) was called by the Holy Roman Emperor Henry III and opened on December 20, 1046, in the hilltown of Sutri, at the edge of the Duchy of Rome. The Catholic Church does not list this as an ecumenical council.

== Record in the Annales Romani ==
The Annales Romani record the events thus:

"Henry, most victorious king by the grace of God...When he arrived at the city of Sutri, he called the Roman clergy along with Pope Gregory to meet with him. He ordered a special synod to be held in the holy church of Sutri and there, lawfully and canonically, he sat in judgment upon Bishop John of Sabina, called Silvester; the archpriest John, called Gregory; and the aforementioned Pope Benedict."

== Reasons for calling the council ==
The council was called to resolve disorder over the papacy. A faction in the church encouraged Henry III to intervene, both to resolve the conflict and to receive his crown from the pope in an official ceremony. In the autumn of 1046 Henry III, already King of the Germans, crossed the Alps at the head of a large army and accompanied by a retinue of the secular and ecclesiastical princes of the empire, all of whom were his sworn vassals. Henry had two intentions, to be crowned Holy Roman emperor by the pope at Rome and, in order that the pontiff concerned have an unassailable title—one that would not cast doubts upon his conferred imperial title— to establish order in the Duchy of Rome.

Rome was in a state of warfare between noble factions, each of whom had a candidate they regarded as pope. A pope presided at St. Peter's, another at the Lateran and a third at Saint Mary Major. Two of them, Benedict IX, a scion of the counts of Tusculum, and Sylvester III of the Crescenzi clan, represented rival factions of the Roman nobility. The claim of the third, Gregory VI, was peculiar in that he had purchased the title in good faith from Benedict IX two years previously. Each claimant had a number of supporters in the Roman church and held a portion of the city.

Henry was met by Gregory at Piacenza and was received with honor. It was decided that a synod should meet at Sutri, some 40 km north of Rome, well beyond the city's factional violence. Before the assembly Gregory testified that he had, "in all good faith and simplicity," purchased the papacy from Pope Benedict IX in 1044. After the departure of Benedict, the Bishop of Sabina had also declared himself pope, as Sylvester III. In 1045 Benedict, not having received his pay-off, returned to Rome and renewed his claim to the papacy.

== Summoning of the three rival Popes ==
The council summoned the three pontiffs, and both Sylvester and Gregory attended. The claims of all three popes were quickly dismissed. Sylvester was stripped of his sacerdotal rank and exiled to a monastery. Gregory resigned (his words were recorded as: "I, Gregory, bishop, servant of the servants of God, do hereby adjudge myself to be removed from the pontificate of the Holy Roman Church, because of the enormous error which by simoniacal impurity has crept into and vitiated my election."), and the council ended on December 23. A form of the council was repeated in Rome the following day to oversee the dismissal of Benedict. The papacy was declared to be sede vacante.

== Appointment of a new Pope ==
On December 24–25 Henry turned first to the powerful Adalbert, Archbishop of Bremen, who refused the dangerous honor. Henry's next choice for the papacy was his personal confessor, Suidger, bishop of the recently created see of Bamberg. Suidger became the new pope, taking the title Clement II, but insisting on retaining the See of Bamberg, which was a source of financial support beyond the reach of Roman factions. He was immediately enthroned on Christmas Day.

As his first pontifical act, Clement II placed the imperial crown upon his benefactor and the queen consort, Agnes, daughter of William V, Duke of Aquitaine. The new emperor received from the Romans and the pope the title and diadem of a Roman Patricius, a dignity with antecedents in the Late Roman Empire, which since the tenth century had been assumed to confer the right to nominate the pontiff. Within a few decades the Gregorian Reforms would call this custom into question.

== Legacy ==
Benedict would again renew his claim to the papacy in 1047, when Clement II died.
