= Pope Gregory VI =

Head of the Catholic Church from 1045 to 1046

- Church: Catholic Church
- Papacy began: 1 May 1045
- Papacy ended: 20 December 1046
- Predecessor: Benedict IX
- Successor: Clement II

Orders
- Created cardinal: 1012 by Benedict VIII

Personal details
- Born: Giovanni Graziano Rome, Papal States, Holy Roman Empire
- Died: 1048 Cologne (most likely), Kingdom of Germany, Holy Roman Empire

Pope Gregory VI (Latin: Gregorius VI; died 1048), born Giovanni Graziano (John Gratian) in Rome (Latin: Ioannes Gratianus), was bishop of Rome and leader of the Papal States from 1 May 1045 until his resignation at the Council of Sutri on 20 December 1046.

== Accession ==
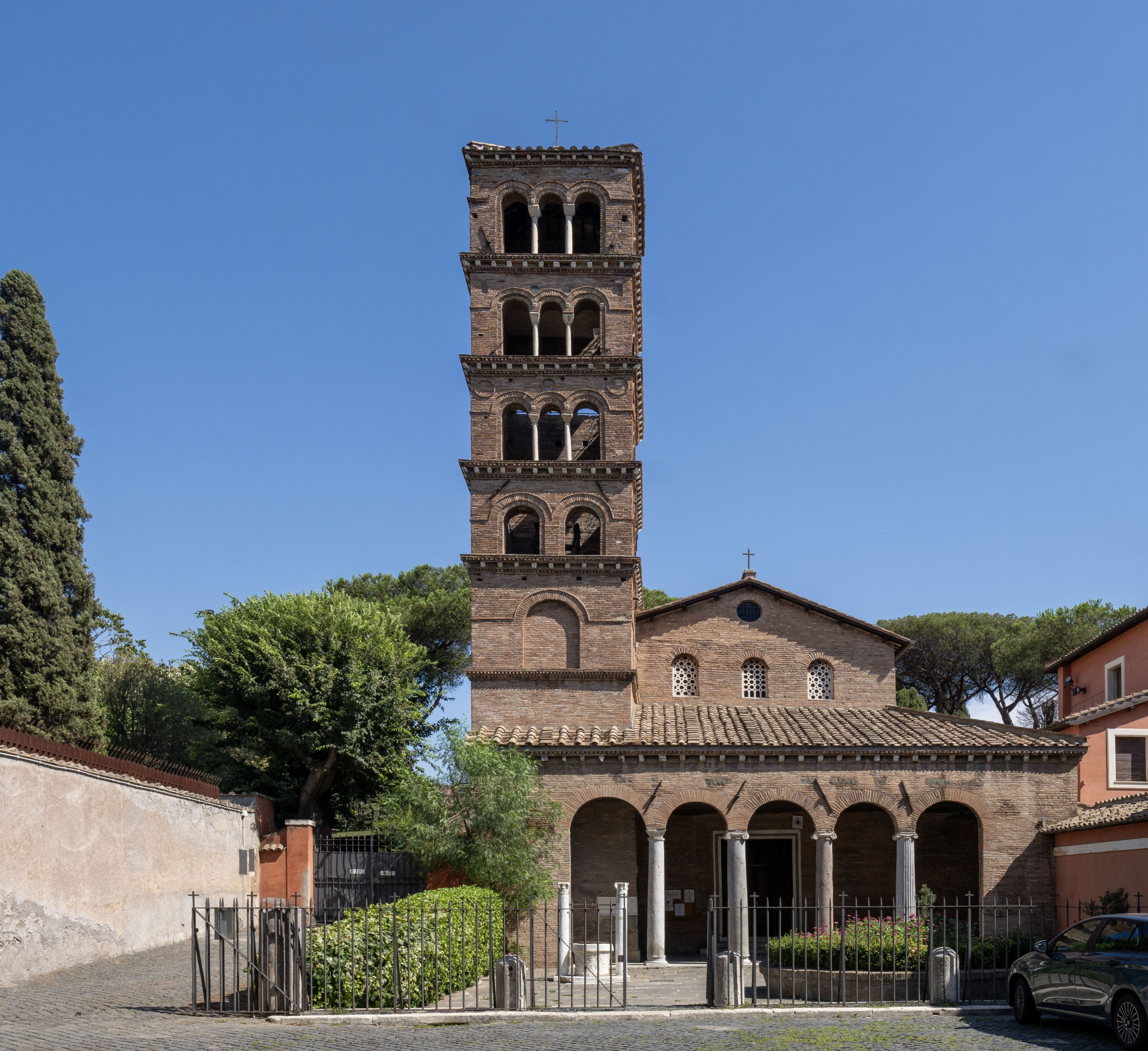
Gratian, later Gregory VI, was archpriest of San Giovanni a Porta Latina (the church exterior has changed little since his day).

Gratian, the archpriest of St. John by the Latin Gate, was a man of great reputation for uprightness of character. He was also the godfather of Pope Benedict IX, who, at the age of ten or twelve, was foisted on the papacy by his powerful family, the Theophylacti, counts of Tusculum. Benedict IX, wishing to marry and vacate the position into which he had been thrust by his family, and having been driven out of Rome by the people, consulted his godfather John as to whether he could resign the pontificate. When he was convinced that he might do so, he offered to give up the papacy into the hands of his godfather if he would reimburse him for his election expenses. Desirous of ridding the See of Rome of such an unworthy pontiff, John Gratian paid him the money and was recognized as Pope in his stead.

The accession of John Gratian, who took the name Gregory VI, did not bring peace, though it was hailed with joy even by such a strict upholder of the right as Peter Damian. When Benedict IX left the city after selling the papacy, there was already another aspirant to the Roman see in the field. John, bishop of Sabina, had been hailed as Pope Sylvester III by the faction of the nobility that had driven Benedict IX from Rome in 1044, and had then installed him in his place. Though Benedict IX soon returned, and forced Sylvester III to retire to his See of Sabina, Sylvester never gave up his claims to the papal throne, and through his political allies contrived apparently to keep some hold on a portion of Rome. To complicate matters, Benedict IX, unable to obtain the bride on whom he had set his heart, soon repented his resignation, claimed the papacy again, and in his turn is thought to have succeeded in acquiring dominion over a part of the city.

== Papacy ==
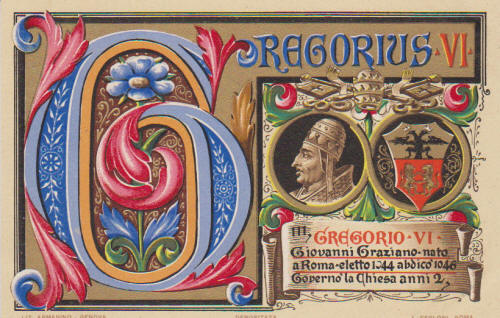
Gregory VI on a 19th-century religious card

With an empty exchequer and a clergy that had largely lost the savour of righteousness, Gregory VI was confronted by an almost hopeless task. Nevertheless, with the aid of his "capellanus" or chaplain, Hildebrand, destined to be Pope Gregory VII, he tried to bring about civil and religious order. He strove to effect the latter by means of letters and councils, and the former by force of arms. But the factions of his rivals were too strong to be put down, and the confusion only increased.

Convinced that nothing could meet the challenges facing the Church except imperial intervention, a number of influential clergy and laity separated themselves from communion with Gregory VI or either of his two rivals and implored King Henry III of Germany to cross the Alps and restore order. Henry III responded to these pleas by descending into Italy in the autumn of 1046. Strong in the conviction of his innocence, Gregory VI went north to meet him. He was received by Henry III with all the honour due to a pope, and in accordance with the royal request, summoned a council to meet at Sutri.

== Synod of Sutri ==
Only Sylvester III and Gregory VI presented themselves at the Synod of Sutri, which was opened on 20 December 1046. The claims of Sylvester III and Benedict IX were quickly rejected, and the former was condemned to be confined in a monastery for the rest of his life. Gregory VI was accused of purchasing the papacy and freely admitted it; he nevertheless denied that this act, given the circumstances, constituted the crime of simony. The bishops of the synod assured Gregory VI that this act was indeed simoniacal, regardless of his virtuous motivations for it, and called upon him to resign. Seeing that little choice was left to him, he complied of his own accord and laid down his office.

Gregory VI was succeeded in the papacy by the German bishop of Bamberg, Suidger, who took the name Pope Clement II. In May 1047 Gregory was taken by Henry to Germany; he died in 1048, probably at Cologne. To the end he was accompanied by Hildebrand, who (after about a year in Cluny) returned to Rome in January 1049 with the newly elected Pope Leo IX. And when Hildebrand himself was elected pope in 1073, he called himself Pope Gregory VII in order to proclaim his firm and loyal belief in the legitimacy of Gratian as Pope Gregory VI.

== Sources ==
- Feytmans Denise (1932). "Grégoire VI était-il simoniaque ?.". (in French). In: Revue belge de philologie et d'histoire vol. 11 (1932). pp. 130-137.
- Lane Poole, Reginald (1917). "Benedict IX and Gregory VI," in: Studies in Chronology and History (Oxford: Clarendon 1934), p. 185-222.
- Mann, Horace Kinder (1910). The Lives of the Popes in the Early Middle Ages, vol. 5 (London: Kegan, Paul, Trench, Trubner 1910 [1925]), pp. 258-262.
- Blumenthal, Ute-Renate (2004). "Gregory VI, Pope." in: Christopher Kleinhelz (ed.), Medieval Italy: An Encyclopedia. New York: Routledge 2004, pp. 457-458.
- Van Wijnendaele Jacques (2005). "Silences et mensonges autour d'un concile. Le concile de Sutri (1046) en son temps." (in French). In: Revue belge de philologie et d'histoire vol. 83 (2005), pp. 315-353.

- "Gregory VI" . The encyclopaedia britannica; v.11. Encyclopædia Britannica. Vol. 11 (9 ed.). Edinburgh: Adam and Charles Black. 1880. p. 176. hdl:2027/nnc1.cu11713925.

Catholic Church titles
Preceded by Benedict IX	Pope; 1045–46	Succeeded by Clement II
