= Pope Sylvester III =

Head of the Catholic Church in 1045

- Bishop of Rome
- Church: Catholic Church
- Papacy began: 20 January 1045
- Papacy ended: 10 March 1045
- Predecessor: Benedict IX
- Successor: Benedict IX

Personal details
- Born: Giovanni dei Crescenzi Ottaviani c. 1000 Rome, Papal States, Holy Roman Empire
- Died: October 1063 (aged 63) Sabina, Papal States, Holy Roman Empire

Pope Sylvester III (c. 1000 – October 1063), born John (Italian: Giovanni) in Rome, was bishop of Rome and ruler of the Papal States from 20 January to 10 March 1045.

== Background ==
Baptised with the name John, he was born into the powerful Roman patrician family Crescentii. Upon the death of Pope John XIX in October 1032, the papal throne became the subject of dispute between rival factions of nobles. Theophylactus, a youth of about twenty, the son of Alberic III, Count of Tusculum, was supported by the nobles of Tusculum. The nephew and namesake of Pope Benedict VIII, he took the name Benedict IX. The young man was not only unqualified, but led a reportedly dissolute life, and factional strife continued. A revolt in Rome led to Benedict IX being driven from the city in 1044.

== Papacy ==
John, bishop of Sabina, was elected after fierce and protracted infighting, c. 21 January 1045. He took the name Sylvester III. Benedict IX excommunicated him, and in March returned to Rome and expelled Sylvester, who himself returned to Sabina to again take up his office of bishop in that diocese.

Nearly two years later, on 20 December 1046, the Council of Sutri, summoned and presided over by the Emperor Henry III, deprived him of his bishopric and priesthood, and ordered him sent to a monastery for the rest of his life. This sentence was suspended, because he continued to function and was recognized as bishop of Sabina until at least 1062. A successor bishop to the see of Sabina, Hubaldus, is recorded under Pope Alexander II, on October 1063, indicating that John must have died prior to that date.

Though some consider him to have been an antipope, Sylvester III continues to be listed as an official pope (1045) in Vatican lists. A similar situation applies to Pope Gregory VI (1045–1046). Sylvester's pontifical name was used again by Antipope Theodoric because at that time he was not considered a legitimate pontiff.

== Notes ==
Catholic Church titles
Preceded by Benedict IX	Pope; 1045	Succeeded by Gregory VI
