= Leo de Benedicto Christiano =

Leo de Benedicto Christiano, or just Benedictus Christianus, was a Jew of Trastevere in the late eleventh century. He converted to Christianity and was baptised by Pope Leo IX, whence he took his Christian name. He related himself to the ancient patrician families of Rome by the marrying of his daughters to powerful suitors. He himself was extremely rich (probably from usury).

In January 1058, as a partisan of the newly elected Pope Nicholas II, Leo had the gates of the Leonine City thrown open for Godfrey, former duke of Lower Lorraine, and his wife, Beatrice, marchioness of Tuscany. Godfrey immediately possessed the Tiber Island and attacked the Lateran, forcing Benedict X to flee on 24 January. Leo allied himself with the reformers, including Hildebrand and Pope Alexander II, but he was unable to dispel, through negotiations, the attack of 14 April 1062 which gave Rome to Antipope Honorius II.

His son was Pier Leoni and through him he is the father of the great Pierleoni family which dominated Roman politics for much of the Middle Ages. So far as one can tell, he lived in peace with the Roman people and the pontiff, but his grandson, who was elevated to the papacy as Antipope Anacletus II, was lambasted for his Hebrew ancestry; as was another grandson, Jordan, who was elected patrician of the Commune of Rome and became also an enemy of the legitimate popes.

== Sources ==
- Gregorovius, Ferdinand. Rome in the Middle Ages Vol. IV Part 1. 1905.
