= Roman Senate =

Political institution in ancient Rome

Roman Senate Senatus Romanus
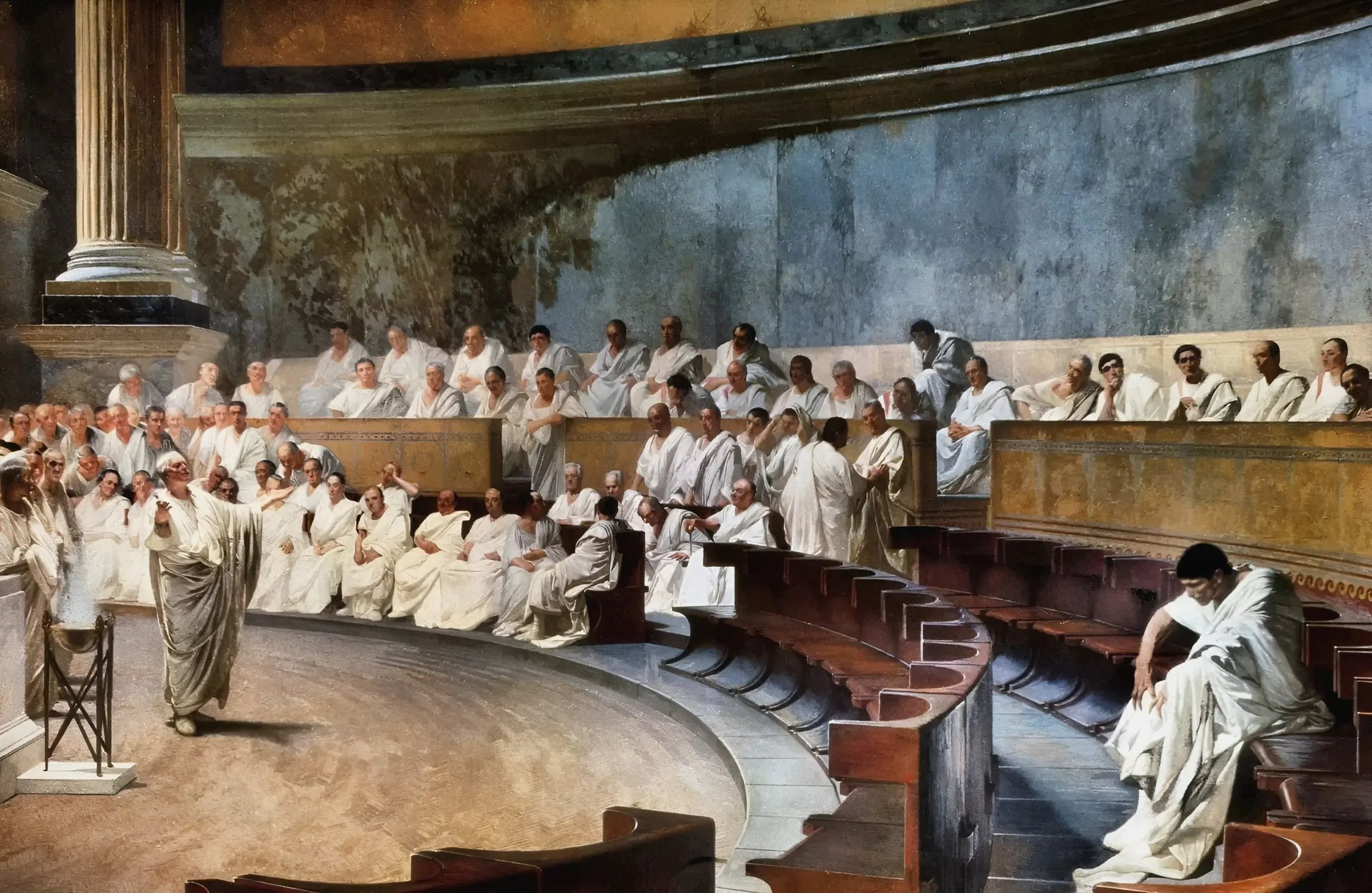

Type
- Type: Advisory and deliberative

History
- Founded: 753 BC; 2779 years ago
- Disbanded: After 603 AD (West); 13th century AD (East)
- Seats: 100 (initially); 300 (early to mid-Republic); 900 (under Julius Caesar); 600 (under Augustus)

Meeting place
- Curia Hostilia, Curia Cornelia, Curia Julia, Theatre of Pompey, and various consecrated temples

The Roman Senate (Latin: Senātus Rōmānus) was the highest and constituting assembly of ancient Rome and its aristocracy. With different powers throughout its existence, it lasted from the first days of the city of Rome (traditionally founded in 753 BC) as the Senate of the Roman Kingdom, to the Senate of the Roman Republic and Senate of the Roman Empire and eventually the Byzantine Senate of the Eastern Roman Empire, existing well into the post-classical era and Middle Ages.

During the days of the Roman Kingdom, the Senate was generally little more than an advisory council to the king. However, as Rome was an electoral monarchy, the Senate also elected new Roman kings. The last king of Rome, Lucius Tarquinius Superbus, was overthrown following a coup d'état led by Lucius Junius Brutus, who founded the Roman Republic. During the early Republic, the Senate was politically weak, while the various executive Roman magistrates who appointed the senators for life (or until expulsion by Roman censors) were quite powerful. Since the transition from monarchy to constitutional rule was most likely gradual, it took several generations before the Senate was able to assert itself over the executive magistrates. By the middle Republic, the Senate had reached the apex of its republican power. The late Republic saw a decline in the Senate's power, which began following the reforms of the tribunes Tiberius and Gaius Gracchus. After the transition of the Republic into the Principate, the Senate lost much of its political power as well as its prestige.

Following the constitutional reforms of Emperor Diocletian, the Senate became politically irrelevant. When the seat of government was transferred out of Rome, the Senate was reduced to a purely municipal body. That decline in status was reinforced when Constantine the Great created an additional senate in Constantinople. After Romulus Augustulus was deposed in 476, the Senate in the Western Empire functioned under the rule of Odoacer (476–489) and during Ostrogothic rule (489–535). It was restored to its official status after the reconquest of Italy by Justinian I but the Western Senate ultimately disappeared after 603, the date of its last recorded public act.

Some Roman aristocrats in the Middle Ages bore the title senator, but by this point it was a purely honorific title and does not reflect the continued existence of the classical Senate. The Eastern Senate survived in Constantinople into the early 13th century. The Roman Senate, etymologically and politically, can be considered a distant ancestor or predecessor of parliamentarism and modern legislatures and senatorial bodies, although its functions and powers varied considerably throughout its relatively lengthy history.

== History ==
=== Senate of the Roman Kingdom ===
The senate was a political institution in the ancient Roman Kingdom. The Latin word senatus, borrowed into English as senate, is derived from senex 'old man'; the word thus means 'assembly of elders'. The prehistoric Indo-Europeans who settled Italy in the centuries before the founding of Rome in 753 BC were structured into tribal communities, and these communities often included an aristocratic board of tribal elders.

The early Roman family was called a gens or "clan", and each clan was an aggregation of families under a common living male patriarch, called a pater (the Latin word for 'father'). When the early Roman gentes were aggregating to form a common community, the patres from the leading clans were selected for the confederated board of elders that would become the Roman senate. Over time, the patres came to recognize the need for a single leader, and so they elected a king (rex), and vested in him their sovereign power. When the king died, that sovereign power naturally reverted to the patres.

The senate is said to have been created by Rome's first king, Romulus, initially consisting of 100 men. The descendants of those 100 men subsequently became the patrician class. Rome's fifth king, Lucius Tarquinius Priscus, chose a further 100 senators. They were chosen from the minor leading families, and were accordingly called the patres minorum gentium. Rome's seventh and final king, Lucius Tarquinius Superbus, executed many of the leading men in the senate, and did not replace them, thereby diminishing their number. In 509 BC Rome's first and third consuls, Lucius Junius Brutus and Publius Valerius Publicola chose from amongst the leading equites new men for the senate, called conscripti, and increased the size of the senate to 300.

The senate of the Roman Kingdom held three principal responsibilities: It functioned as the ultimate repository for the executive power, it served as the king's council, and it functioned as a legislative body in concert with the people of Rome. During the years of the monarchy, the senate's most important function was to elect new kings. While the king was nominally elected by the people, it was actually the senate who chose each new king. The period between the death of one king and the election of a new king was called the interregnum, during which time the Interrex nominated a candidate to replace the king. After the senate gave its initial approval to the nominee, he was then formally elected by the people, and then received the senate's final approval. At least one king, Servius Tullius, was elected by the senate alone, and not by the people.

The senate's most significant task, outside regal elections, was to function as the king's council, and while the king could ignore any advice it offered, its growing prestige helped make the advice that it offered increasingly difficult to ignore. Only the king could make new laws, although he often involved both the senate and the curiate assembly (the popular assembly) in the process.

=== Senate of the Roman Republic ===
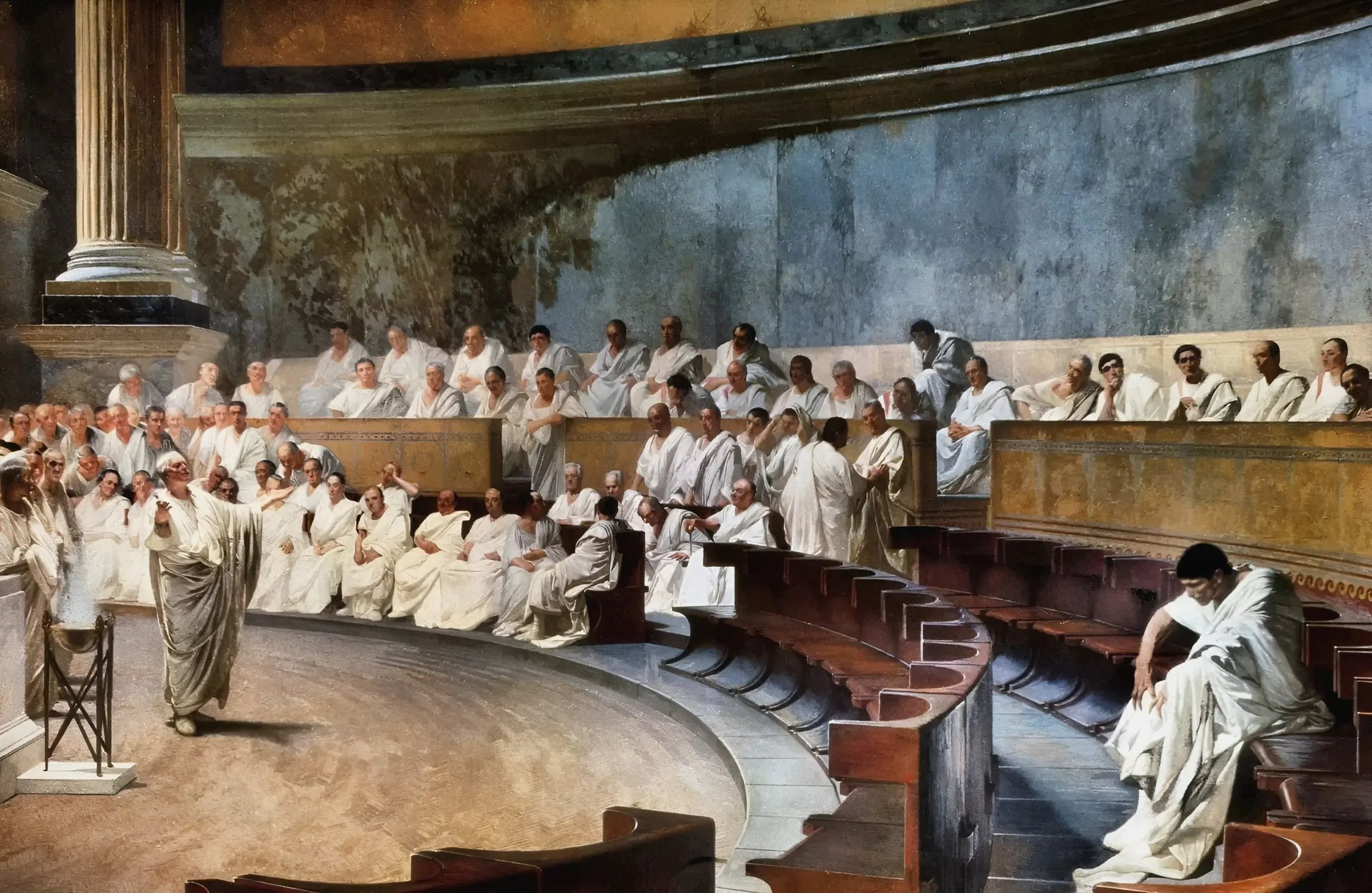
Representation of a sitting of the Roman senate: Cicero attacks Catiline, from a 19th-century fresco in Palazzo Madama, Rome, house of the Italian Senate. It is worth noting that idealistic medieval and subsequent artistic depictions of the Senate in session are almost uniformly inaccurate. Illustrations commonly show the senators arranged in a semicircle around an open space where orators were deemed to stand; in reality the structure of the existing Curia Julia building, which dates in its current form from the Emperor Diocletian, shows that the senators sat in straight and parallel lines on either side of the interior of the building. In modern media depictions in film this is shown correctly in The Fall of the Roman Empire, and incorrectly in, for example, Spartacus.

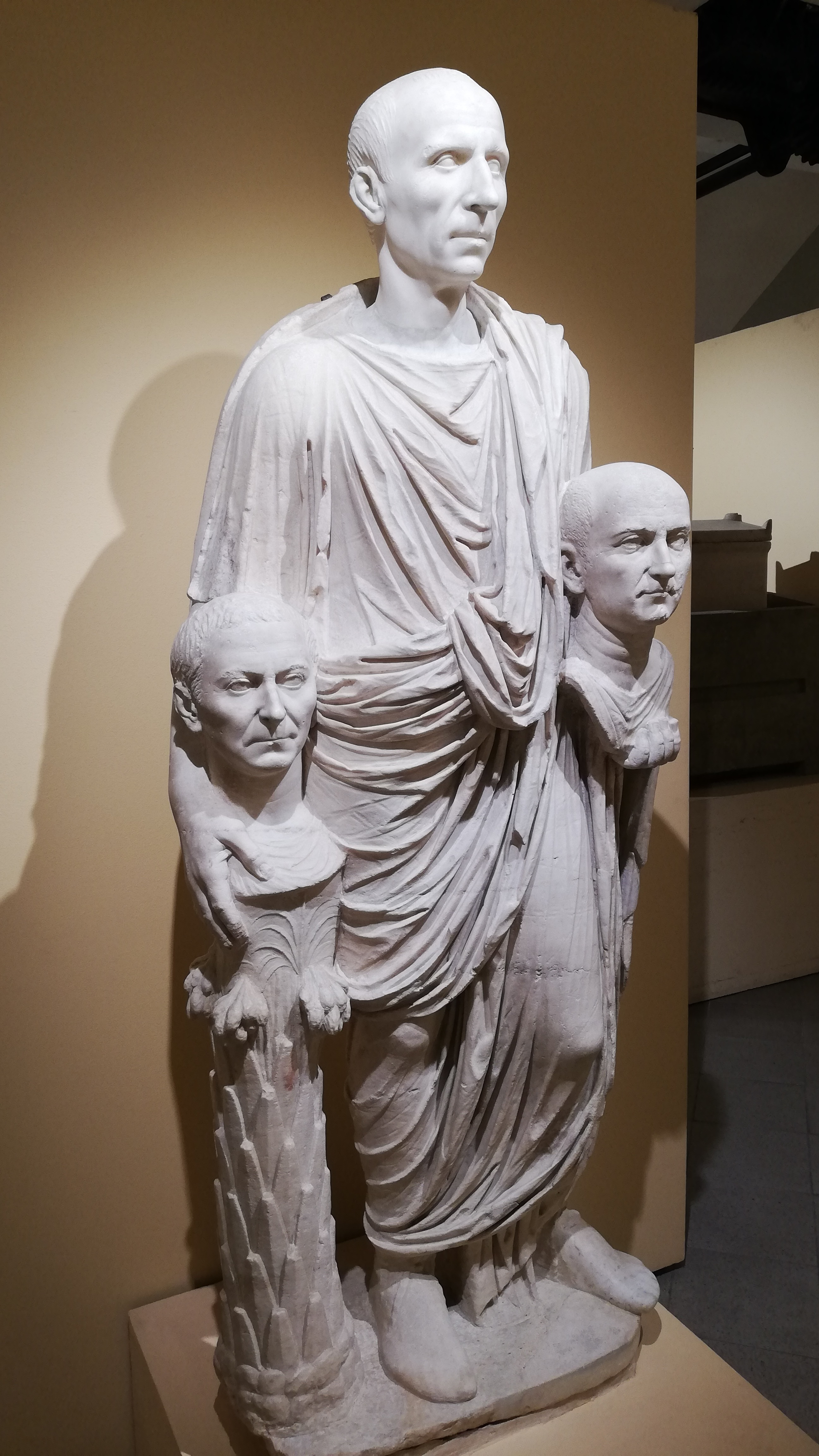
The "Togatus Barberini", a statue depicting a Roman senator holding the imagines (effigies) of deceased ancestors in his hands. Marble, late 1st century BC. Head, not belonging: mid-1st century BC

When the Republic began in 509 BC, the Senate functioned as a special committee. It consisted of 300–500 senators who served for life. Only patricians were members in the early period. Plebeians were admitted later, although they were denied the senior magistracies for a longer period. The Senate held the fiscal responsibilities of the Roman Republic's treasury, holding a regulatory power over incoming and outgoing transactions. The Senate was ultimately in charge of creating and maintaining public buildings, as only they had the power to distribute grants to the Censors. The Senate also oversaw judicial proceedings in extreme cases of violent offenses in Italy. At the request of allies of Italy, the Senate could oversee their judicial proceedings on extreme cases requiring further investigation as well. The Senate was also in charge of diplomatic measures in the representation of the Roman Republic.

Senators were entitled to wear a toga with a broad purple stripe, maroon shoes, and an iron, later gold, ring. The Senate of the Roman Republic passed decrees called senatus consulta, which in form constituted "advice" from the senate to a magistrate. While these decrees did not hold legal force, they usually were obeyed in practice. If a senatus consultum conflicted with a law (lex) that was passed by an assembly, the law overrode the senatus consultum because the senatus consultum had its authority based on precedent and not in law. A senatus consultum, however, could serve to interpret a law.

Through these decrees, the senate directed the magistrates, especially the Roman Consuls (the chief magistrates), in their prosecution of military conflicts. The senate also had an enormous degree of power over the civil government in Rome. This was especially the case with regard to its management of state finances, as only it could authorize the disbursal of public funds from the treasury. As the Roman Republic grew, the senate also supervised the administration of the provinces, which were governed by former consuls and praetors, in that it decided which magistrate should govern which province. Since the 3rd century BC, the senate played a pivotal role in cases of emergency. It could call for the appointment of a dictator, a right resting with each consul with or without the senate's involvement. After 202 BC, the office of dictator fell out of use, and was revived only two more times. It was replaced with the senatus consultum ultimum ("ultimate decree of the senate"), a senatorial decree that authorised the consuls to employ any means necessary to solve the crisis.

While senate meetings could take place either inside or outside the formal boundary of the city (the pomerium), no meeting could take place more than a mile (in the Roman system of measurement, now approx. 1.48 km) outside it. The senate operated while under religious restrictions. For example, before any meeting could begin, a sacrifice to the gods was made, and a search for divine omens (the auspices) was taken. The senate was only allowed to assemble in places dedicated to the gods. Meetings usually began at dawn, and a magistrate who wished to summon the senate had to issue a compulsory order. The senate meetings were public and directed by a presiding magistrate, usually a consul. While in session, the senate had the power to act on its own, and even against the will of the presiding magistrate if it wished. The presiding magistrate began each meeting with a speech, then referred an issue to the senators, who would discuss it in order of seniority.

Senators had several other ways in which they could influence, or frustrate, a presiding magistrate. For example, every senator was permitted to speak before a vote could be held, and since all meetings had to end by nightfall, a dedicated group or even a single senator could talk a proposal to death (a filibuster or diem consumere). When it was time to call a vote, the presiding magistrate could bring up whatever proposals he wished, and every vote was between a proposal and its negative.

Despite dictators holding nominal power, the senate could veto any of the dictator's decisions. At any point before a motion passed, the proposed motion could be vetoed, usually by a tribune. If there was no veto, and the matter was of minor importance, it could be put to either a voice vote or a show of hands. If there was no veto and no obvious majority, and the matter was of a significant nature, there was usually a physical division of the house, with senators voting by taking a place on either side of the chamber. Senate membership was controlled by the censors. By the time of Augustus, ownership of property worth at least one million sesterces was required for membership. The ethical requirements of senators were significant. In contrast to members of the Equestrian order, senators could not engage in banking or any form of public contract. They could not own a ship that was large enough to participate in foreign commerce, they could not leave Italy without permission from the rest of the senate and they were not paid a salary. Election to magisterial office resulted in automatic senate membership.

=== Senate of the Roman Empire ===
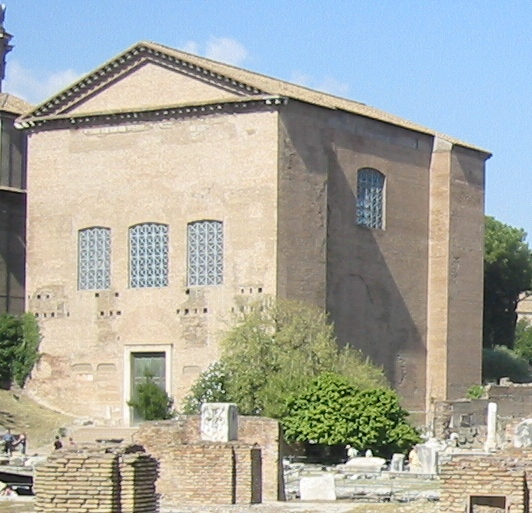
The Curia Julia in the Roman Forum, the seat of the imperial Senate

After the fall of the Roman Republic, the constitutional balance of power shifted from the Roman senate to the Roman emperor. Though retaining its legal position as under the republic, in practice the actual authority of the imperial senate was negligible, and the emperor held the true power in the state. As such, membership in the senate came to be sought after by individuals seeking prestige and social standing, rather than actual authority. During the reigns of the first emperors, legislative, judicial, and electoral powers were all transferred from the Roman assemblies to the senate. Since the emperor held control over the senate, the senate acted as a vehicle through which he exercised his autocratic powers. The first emperor, Augustus, reduced the size of the senate from 900 members to 600, even though there were only about 100 to 200 active senators at one time. After this point, the size of the senate was never again drastically altered. Under the empire, as was the case during the late republic, one could become a senator by being elected quaestor (a magistrate with financial duties), but only if one were already of senatorial rank.

In addition to quaestors, elected officials holding a range of senior positions were routinely granted senatorial rank by virtue of the offices that they held. If an individual was not of senatorial rank, there were two ways for him to become a senator. Under the first method, the emperor manually granted that individual the authority to stand for election to the quaestorship, while under the second method, the emperor appointed that individual to the senate by issuing a decree. Under the empire, the power that the emperor held over the senate was absolute. The two consuls were a part of the senate, but had more power than the senators. During senate meetings, the emperor sat between the two consuls, and usually acted as the presiding officer. Senators of the early empire could ask extraneous questions or request that a certain action be taken by the senate. Higher ranking senators spoke before those of lower rank, although the emperor could speak at any time. Besides the emperor, consuls and praetors could also preside over the senate. Since no senator could stand for election to a magisterial office without the emperor's approval, senators usually did not vote against bills that had been presented by the emperor. If a senator disapproved of a bill, he usually showed his disapproval by not attending the senate meeting on the day that the bill was to be voted on.

While the Roman assemblies continued to meet after the founding of the empire, their powers were all transferred to the senate, and so senatorial decrees (senatus consulta) acquired the full force of law. The legislative powers of the imperial senate were principally of a financial and an administrative nature, although the senate did retain a range of powers over the provinces. During the early Roman Empire, all judicial powers that had been held by the Roman assemblies were also transferred to the senate. For example, the senate now held jurisdiction over criminal trials. In these cases, a consul presided, the senators constituted the jury, and the verdict was handed down in the form of a decree (senatus consultum). A verdict could not be appealed, but the emperor could pardon a convicted individual through a veto. The emperor Tiberius transferred all electoral powers from the assemblies to the senate, and while theoretically the senate elected new magistrates, the approval of the emperor was always needed before an election could be finalized.

Around 300 AD, the emperor Diocletian enacted a series of constitutional reforms. In one such reform, he asserted the right of the emperor to take power without the theoretical consent of the senate, thus depriving the senate of its status as the ultimate repository of supreme power. Diocletian's reforms also ended whatever illusion had remained that the senate had independent legislative, judicial, or electoral powers. The senate retained its legislative powers over public games in Rome, and over the senatorial order. The senate also retained the power to try treason cases, and to elect some magistrates, but only with the permission of the emperor. In the final years of the western empire, the senate would sometimes try to appoint their own emperor, such as in the case of Eugenius, who was later defeated by forces loyal to Theodosius I. The senate remained the last stronghold of the traditional Roman religion in the face of the spreading Christianity, and several times attempted to facilitate the return of the Altar of Victory (first removed by Constantius II) to the senatorial curia. According to the Historia Augusta (Elagabalus 4.2 and 12.3) emperor Elagabalus had his mother or grandmother take part in Senate proceedings. "And Elagabalus was the only one of all the emperors under whom a woman attended the senate like a man, just as though she belonged to the senatorial order" (David Magie's translation). According to the same work, Elagabalus also established a women's senate called the senaculum, which enacted rules to be applied to matrons regarding clothing, chariot riding, the wearing of jewelry, etc. (Elagabalus 4.3 and Aurelian 49.6). Before this, Agrippina the Younger, mother of Nero, had been listening to Senate proceedings, concealed behind a curtain, according to Tacitus (Annales, 13.5).

=== Post-classical Senate ===
==== Senate in the West ====
After the fall of the Western Roman Empire, the senate continued to function under the Germanic chieftain Odoacer, and then under Ostrogothic rule. The authority of the senate rose considerably under barbarian leaders, who sought to protect the institution. This period was characterized by the rise of prominent Roman senatorial families, such as the Anicii, while the senate's leader, the princeps senatus, often served as the right hand of the barbarian leader. It is known that the senate successfully installed Laurentius as pope in 498, despite the fact that both King Theodoric and Emperor Anastasius supported the other candidate, Symmachus.

The peaceful coexistence of senatorial and barbarian rule continued until the Ostrogothic leader Theodahad found himself at war with Emperor Justinian I and took the senators as hostages. Then, in 552, a number of senators were slain by the Ostrogothics as revenge for the death of the Ostrogothic king, Totila. After Rome was recaptured by the imperial (Byzantine) army, the senate was restored, but the institution – like classical Rome itself – had been mortally weakened by the long war. Many senators had been killed and many of those who had fled to the east chose to remain there, thanks to favorable legislation passed by Emperor Justinian, who, however, abolished virtually all senatorial offices in Italy. The importance of the Roman senate thus declined rapidly, and it likely ceased to function as an institution with any real legislative power shortly after this time.

It is not known exactly when the Roman senate disappeared in the West, but it appears to have been in the early 7th century, when Rome was under the dominion of the Exarchate of Ravenna. Records show that in both 578 and 580, the politically-impotent senate of Rome sent envoys to Constantinople along with pleas for help against the Lombards, who had invaded Italy ten years earlier. Later, in 593, Pope Gregory I gave a sermon in which he bemoaned the almost complete disappearance of the senatorial order and the decline of the prestigious institution, suggesting that by this date, the senate had officially ceased to function as a body.

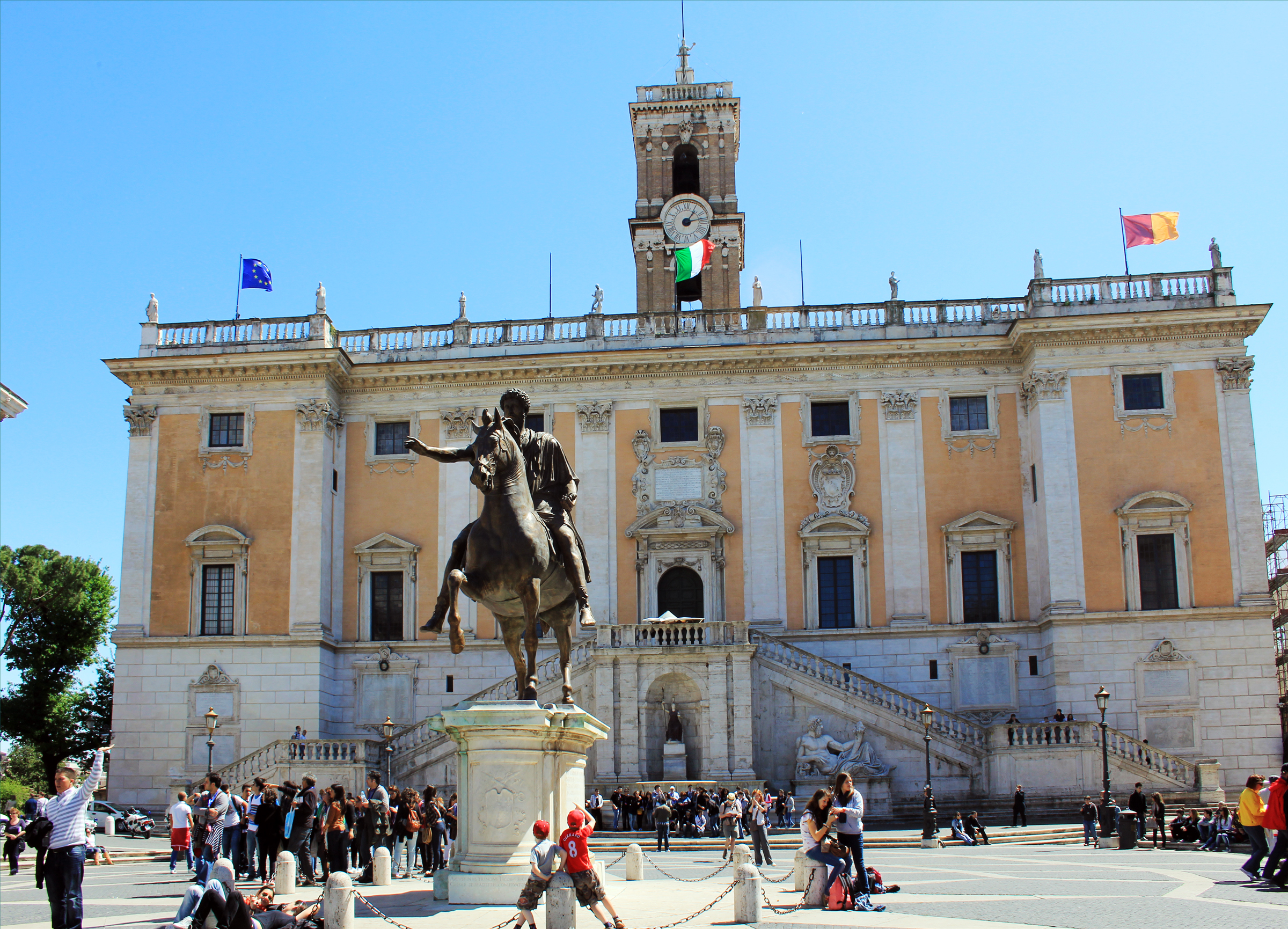
The Palazzo Senatorio, originally built to house the revived Senate during the Roman Commune period

Although the Gregorian register of 603 mentions the senate in reference to the acclamation of new statues of Emperor Phocas and Empress Leontia, scholars such as Ernst Stein and André Chastagnol have argued that this mention was likely nothing more than a ceremonial flourish. In 630, any remnants of the senate were swept away when the Curia Julia was converted into a church (Sant'Adriano al Foro) by Pope Honorius I. Subsequently, the word "senate" was used by the nobility of Rome to describe themselves as a collective class. This usage was not intended to link them institutionally with the ancient senate, but rather continued the long-standing Roman tradition that the city's nobility was equated to its senate. Occasionally in the Early Middle Ages, the title "senator" was used by those in positions of power—for instance, it was held by Crescentius the Younger (d. 998) and, in its feminine form (senatrix), by Marozia (d. 937)—but it appears to have been regarded at that time as simply a title of nobility.

In 1144, usage of the "senator" title in a more traditional sense was revived, when the Commune of Rome attempted to establish a new senate in opposition to the temporal power of the nobles and the pope. As part of this plan, the Commune constructed a new senate house (the Palazzo Senatorio) on the Capitoline Hill, apparently in the mistaken belief that this was the site of the ancient senate house. Most sources state that there were 56 senators in the revived senate, and modern historians have therefore interpreted this to indicate that there were four senators for each of the fourteen regiones of Rome. These senators elected as their leader Giordano Pierleoni, son of the Roman consul Pier Leoni, with the title patrician, since the term consul had been deprecated as a noble styling.

The Commune came under constant pressure from the papacy and the Holy Roman Emperor during the second half of the twelfth century. In 1191, a popular uprising overthrew the 56-strong senate in favor of a single individual, styled Summus Senator, who became the head of the civil government of Rome. The first Summus Senator, a man named Benedetto Carushomo, ruled Rome for two years. Within a few years of Carushomo's rule, the multi-member senate was restored. This time, the institution was composed largely of nobles.

==== Senate in the East ====
The senate continued to exist in Constantinople. It evolved into an institution that differed in some fundamental forms from its predecessor. Designated in Greek as synkletos, or assembly, the Senate of Constantinople was made up of all current or former holders of senior ranks and official positions, plus their descendants. At its height during the 6th and 7th centuries, the Senate represented the collective wealth and power of the Empire, on occasion nominating and dominating individual emperors.

In the second half of the 10th century a new office, proedros (Greek: πρόεδρος), was created as head of the senate by Emperor Nicephorus Phocas. Up to the mid-11th century, only eunuchs could become proedros. Later this restriction was lifted and several proedri could be appointed, of which the senior proedrus, or protoproedrus (Greek: πρωτοπρόεδρος), served as the head of the senate. There were two types of meetings practised: silentium, in which only magistrates currently in office participated and conventus, in which all syncletics (Greek: συγκλητικοί, senators) could participate. The Senate in Constantinople existed until at least the beginning of the 13th century, its last known act being the election of Nicholas Kanabos as emperor in 1204 during the Fourth Crusade.

== See also ==
- Acta Senatus
- Aedile
- Centuria
- Curia
- Comitia curiata
- Gerousia
- SPQR
- Cursus honorum
- Interrex
- Master of the Horse
- Pontifex Maximus
- Princeps senatus
- Promagistrate
- Roman Law
- Plebeian Council
- Praetor
- Commune of Rome

== Bibliography ==
=== Primary sources ===
- Cicero, Marcus Tullius De Re Publica, Book Two
- Cicero, Marcus Tullius (1841). The Political Works of Marcus Tullius Cicero: Comprising his Treatise on the Commonwealth; and his Treatise on the Laws. Translated from the original, with Dissertations and Notes in Two Volumes. By Francis Barham, Esq. London: Edmund Spettigue. Vol. 1.
- Livy, Ab urbe condita
- Polybius (1823). The General History of Polybius: Translated from the Greek. By James Hampton. Oxford: Printed by W. Baxter. Fifth Edition, Vol 2.
- Polybius, Rome at the End of the Punic Wars: An Analysis of the Roman Government

=== Secondary sources ===
- Abbott, Frank Frost (1901). A History and Description of Roman Political Institutions. Elibron Classics, ISBN 0-543-92749-0.
- Barnish, S. J. B. (1988). "Transformation and Survival in the Western Senatorial Aristocracy, c. A.D. 400–700". Papers of the British School at Rome. 56: 120–155. doi:10.1017/S0068246200009582. JSTOR 40310886.
- Brewer, E. Cobham; Dictionary of Phrase and Fable (1898).
- Brown, T. S. (1984). Gentlemen and Officers: Imperial Administration and Aristocratic Power in Byzantine Italy, A.D. 554–800. British School at Rome.
- Byrd, Robert (1995). The Senate of the Roman Republic. U.S. Government Printing Office, Senate Document 103–23.
- Chastagnol, André (2002). "Nobility, Roman § Up to Gregory the Greg". In Levillain, Philippe (ed.). The Papacy: An Encyclopedia. Vol. 2. London: Routledge. pp. 1044–1047.
- Cooper, Kate; Julia Hillner (2007). Religion, Dynasty, and Patronage in Early Christian Rome, 300–900. Cambridge University Press. ISBN 978-1-139-46838-1.
- Gregorovius, Ferdinand (1905). History of the City of Rome in the Middle Ages. Vol. 2. Translated by Hamilton, Annie. London: George Bell & Sons.
- Grisar, Hartmann (1912). History of Rome and the Popes in the Middle Ages. Vol. 2. Translated by Cappadelta, Luigi. London: Kegan Paul, Trench, Trubner & Co.
- Hooke, Nathaniel; The Roman History, from the Building of Rome to the Ruin of the Commonwealth, F. Rivington (Rome). Original in New York Public Library
- Kaegi, Walter Emil (2003). Heraclius, Emperor of Byzantium. Cambridge University Press. p. 196. ISBN 978-0-521-81459-1.
- Levillain, Philippe (2002). The Papacy: Gaius-Proxies. Psychology Press. ISBN 978-0-415-92230-2.
- Lintott, Andrew (1999). The Constitution of the Roman Republic. Oxford University Press (ISBN 0-19-926108-3).
- Metz, David (2008). Daily Life of the Ancient Romans. Hackett Publishing Company. pp. 59 & 60. ISBN 978-0-87220-957-2.
- Neil, Bronwen; Matthew J. Dal Santo (2013). A Companion to Gregory the Great. Brill. p. 3. ISBN 978-90-04-25776-4.
- Phillips, Jonathan (2004). The Fourth Crusade and the Siege of Constantinople. Penguin. ISBN 978-1101127728.
- Richards, Jeffrey (1979). The Popes and the Papacy in the Early Middle Ages, 476–752. Routledge. ISBN 978-0710000989.
- Runciman, Steven (1956). Byzantine Civilisation. Meridian.
- Taylor, Lily Ross (1966). Roman Voting Assemblies: From the Hannibalic War to the Dictatorship of Caesar. The University of Michigan Press (ISBN 0-472-08125-X).
- Schnurer, Gustov (1956). Church And Culture in the Middle Ages 350–814. Kessinger Publishing (ISBN 978-1-4254-2322-3).
- Wood, Reverend James, The Nuttall Encyclopædia (1907) – a work now in public domain.
