= Senate of the Roman Republic =

Governing and advisory assembly of the aristocracy

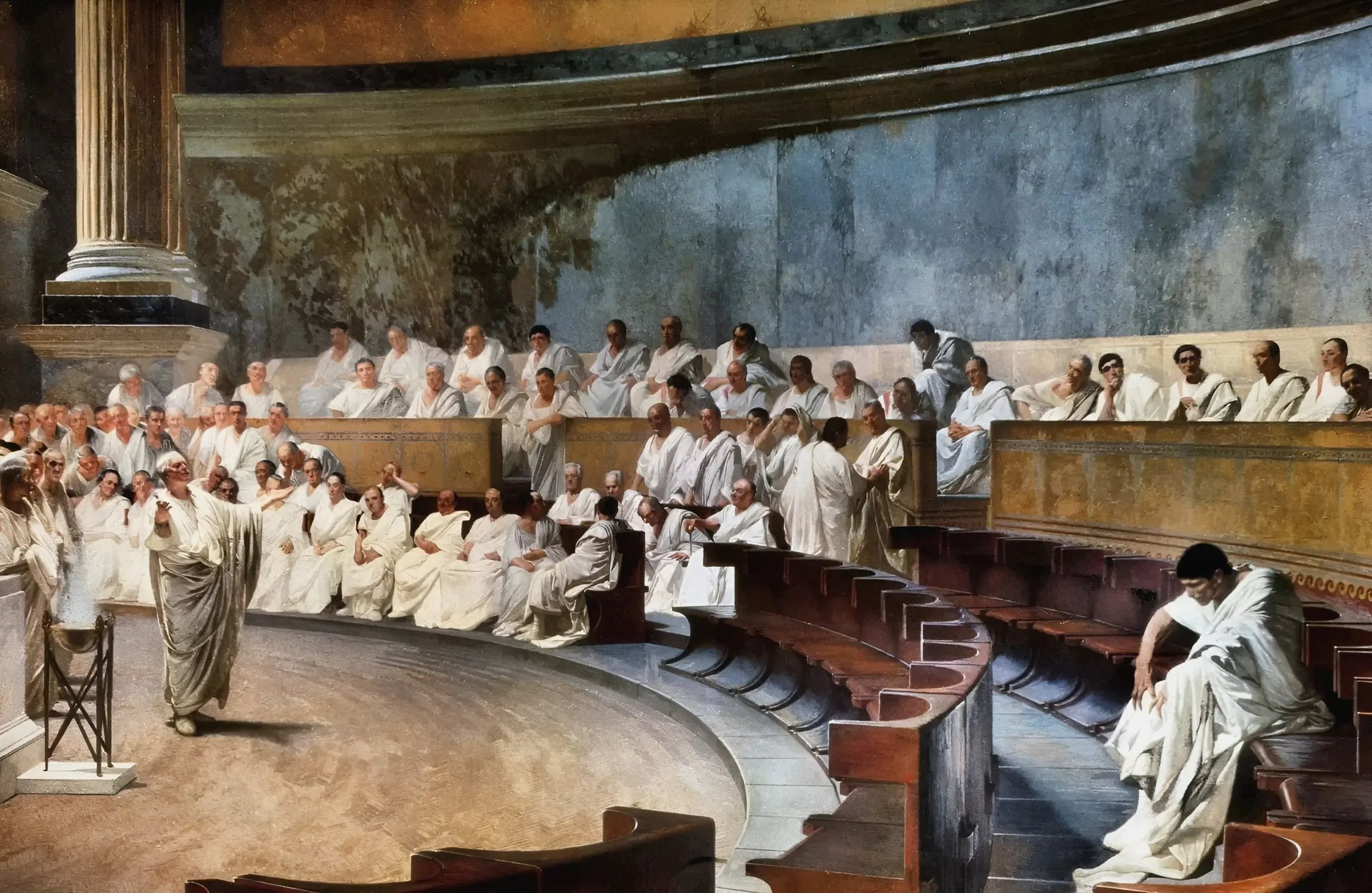
Representation of a sitting of the Roman Senate: Cicero attacks Catiline, from a 19th-century fresco

The Senate was the governing and advisory assembly of the aristocracy in the ancient Roman Republic. It was not an elected body, but one whose members were appointed by the consuls, and later by the censors, which were appointed by the aristocratic Centuriate Assembly. After a Roman magistrate served his term in office, it usually was followed with automatic appointment to the Senate. According to the Greek historian Polybius, the principal source on the Constitution of the Roman Republic, the Roman Senate was the predominant branch of government. Polybius noted that it was the consuls (the highest-ranking of the regular magistrates) who led the armies and the civil government in Rome, and it was the Roman assemblies which had the ultimate authority over elections, legislation, and criminal trials. However, since the Senate controlled money, administration, and the details of foreign policy, it had the most control over day-to-day life. The power and authority of the Senate derived from precedent, the high caliber and prestige of the senators, and the Senate's unbroken lineage, which dated back to the founding of the Republic in 509 BC. It developed from the Senate of the Roman Kingdom, and became the Senate of the Roman Empire.

Originally the chief magistrates, the consuls, appointed all new senators. They also had the power to remove individuals from the Senate. Around the year 318 BC, the "Ovinian Plebiscite" (plebiscitum Ovinium) gave this power to another Roman magistrate, the censor, who retained this power until the end of the Roman Republic. This law also required the censors to appoint any newly elected magistrate to the Senate. Thus, after this point in time, election to magisterial office resulted in automatic Senate membership. The appointment was for life, although the censor could impeach any senator.

The Senate directed the magistrates, especially the consuls, in their prosecution of military conflicts. The Senate also had an enormous degree of power over the civil government in Rome. This was especially the case with regard to its management of state finances, as only it could authorize the disbursal of public monies from the treasury. In addition, the Senate passed decrees called senatus consulta, which were official "advice" from the Senate to a magistrate. While technically these decrees did not have to be obeyed, in practice, they usually were. During an emergency, the Senate (and only the Senate) could authorize the appointment of a dictator. The last ordinary dictator, however, was appointed in 202 BC. After 202 BC, the Senate responded to emergencies by passing the senatus consultum ultimum ("Ultimate Decree of the Senate"), which suspended civil government and declared something analogous to martial law.

== Venue and ethical standards ==
The rules and procedures of the Roman Senate were both complex and ancient. Many of these rules and procedures originated in the early years of the Republic, and were upheld over the centuries under the principle of mos maiorum ("customs of the ancestors"). While Senate meetings could take place either inside or outside of the formal boundary of the city (the pomerium), no meeting could take place more than a mile outside of the pomerium. Senate meetings might take place outside of the formal boundary of the city for several reasons. For example, the Senate might wish to meet with an individual, such as a foreign ambassador, whom they did not wish to allow inside the city.

At the beginning of the year, the first Senate meeting always took place at the Temple of Jupiter Capitolinus. Other venues could include the Temple of Fides or the Temple of Concord, or, if the meeting was outside of the formal boundary of the city, at the Temple of Apollo or (if a war meeting) at the Temple of Bellona. In addition, the Senate operated while under various religious restrictions. For example, before any meeting could begin, a sacrifice to the gods was made, and a search for divine omens (the auspices) was taken. The auspices were taken in order to determine whether that particular Senate meeting held favor with the gods. The Senate was only allowed to meet in a building of religious significance, such as the Curia Hostilia.

The ethical requirements of senators were significant. Senators could not engage in banking or any form of public contract without legal approval. They could not own a ship that was large enough to participate in foreign commerce without legal approval, and they could not leave Italy without permission from the Senate. In addition, since they were not paid, individuals usually sought to become a senator only if they were independently wealthy.

The censors were the magistrates who enforced the ethical standards of the Senate. Whenever a censor punished a senator, they had to allege some specific failing. Possible reasons for punishing a member included corruption, abuse of capital punishment, or the disregard of a colleague's veto, constitutional precedent, or the auspices. Senators who failed to obey various laws could also be punished. While punishment could include impeachment (expulsion) from the Senate, often a punishment was less severe than outright expulsion. While the standard was high for expelling a member from the Senate, it was easier to deny a citizen the right to join the Senate. Various moral failings could result in one not being allowed to join the Senate, including bankruptcy, prostitution, or a prior history of having been a gladiator. One law (the Lex repetundarum of 123 BC) made it illegal for a citizen to become a senator if they had been convicted of a criminal offense. Many of these laws were enacted in the last century of the Republic, as public corruption began reaching unprecedented levels.

== Debates ==
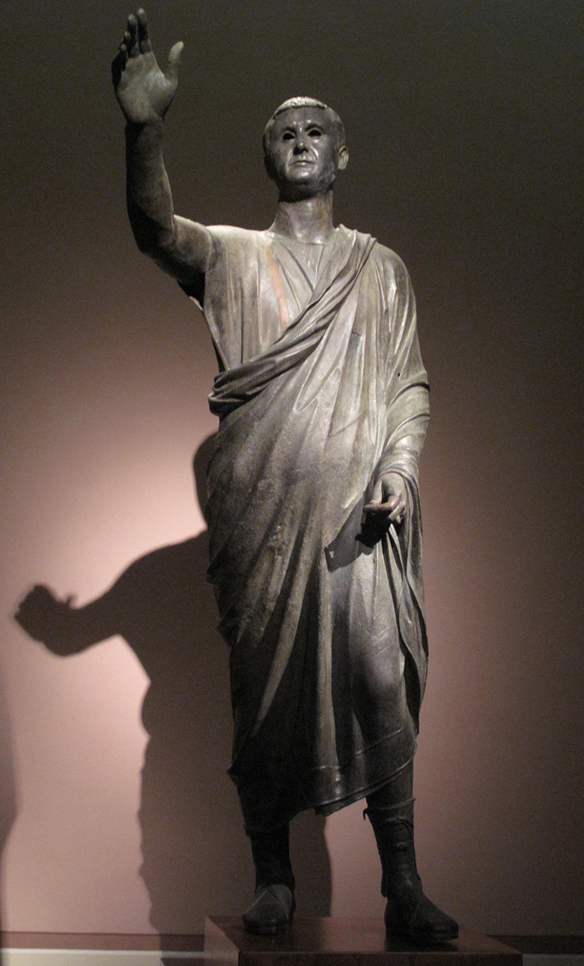
The Orator, c. 100 BC, an Etrusco-Roman bronze sculpture depicting Aule Metele (Latin: Aulus Metellus), an Etruscan man of Roman senatorial rank, engaging in rhetoric. He wears senatorial shoes and a toga praetexta of the "skimpy" (exigua) Republican type. The statue features an inscription in the Etruscan alphabet

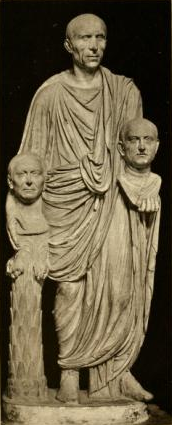
The so-called "Togatus Barberini", a statue depicting a Roman senator holding the imagines (effigies) of deceased ancestors in his hands; marble, late 1st century BC; head (not belonging): mid 1st century BC.

Meetings usually began at dawn, although occasionally certain events (such as festivals) might delay then beginning of a meeting. A magistrate who wished to summon the Senate had to issue a compulsory order (a cogere), and senators could be punished if they failed to appear without reasonable cause. In 44 BC for example, consul Mark Antony threatened to demolish the house of the former consul Cicero for this very reason. The Senate meetings were technically public because the doors were usually left open, which allowed people to look in, but only senators could speak. The Senate was directed by a presiding magistrate, who was usually either a consul (the highest-ranking magistrate) or, if the consul was unavailable, a Praetor (the second-highest ranking magistrate), usually the urban praetor. By the late Republic, another type of magistrate, a plebeian tribune, would sometimes preside.

While in session, the Senate had the power to act on its own, and even against the will of the presiding magistrate if it wished. The presiding magistrate began each meeting with a speech (the verba fecit), which was usually brief, but was sometimes a lengthy oration. The presiding magistrate would then begin a discussion by referring an issue to the senators, who would discuss the issue, one at a time, by order of seniority, with the first to speak, the most senior senator, known as the princeps senatus (leader of the Senate), who was then followed by ex-consuls (consulares), and then the praetors and ex-praetors (praetorii). This continued, until the most junior senators had spoken. Senators who had held magisterial office always spoke before those who had not, and if a patrician was of equal seniority as a plebeian, the patrician would always speak first.

A senator could make a brief statement, discuss the matter in detail, or talk about an unrelated topic. All senators had to speak before a vote could be held, and since all meetings had to end by nightfall, a senator could talk a proposal to death (a filibuster or diem consumere) if they could keep the debate going until nightfall. It is known, for example, that the senator Cato the Younger once filibustered in an attempt to prevent the Senate from granting Julius Caesar a law that would have given land to the veterans of Pompey.

== Delaying and obstructive tactics ==
Senators had several ways in which they could influence (or frustrate) a presiding magistrate. When a presiding magistrate was proposing a motion, for example, the senators could call "consult" (consule), which required the magistrate to ask for the opinions of the senators. Any senator could demand a quorum call (with the cry of numera), which required a count of the senators present. Like modern quorum calls, this was usually a delaying tactic. Senators could also demand that a motion be divided into smaller motions. Acts such as applause, booing, or heckling often played a major role in a debate, and, in part because all senators had an absolute right to free speech, any senator could respond at any point if he was attacked personally. Once debates were underway, they were usually difficult for the presiding magistrate to control. The presiding magistrate typically only regained some control once the debating had ended, and a vote was about to be taken.

In the later years of the Republic, attempts were made by the aristocracy to limit the increasing level of chaos associated with the obstructive tendencies and democratic impulses of some of the senators. Laws were enacted to prevent the inclusion of extraneous material in bills before the Senate. Other laws were enacted to outlaw the so-called omnibus bills, which are bills, usually enacted by a single vote, that contain a large volume of often unrelated material.

Laws were also enacted to strengthen the requirement that three days pass between the proposal of a bill, and the vote on that bill. During his term as dictator, Julius Caesar enacted laws that required the publication of Senate resolutions. This publication, called the acta diurna, or "daily proceedings", was meant to increase transparency and minimize the potential for abuse. This publication was posted in the Roman Forum, and then sent by messengers throughout the provinces.

== Votes and the Tribune's vote ==
When it was time to call a vote, the presiding magistrate could bring up whatever proposals (in whatever order) he wished, and every vote was between a proposal and its negative. Quorums were required for votes to be held, and it is known that in 67 BC the size of a quorum was set at 200 senators (by the lex Cornelia de privilegiis). At any point before a motion passed, the proposed motion could be vetoed. Usually, vetoes were handed down by plebeian tribunes. If the Senate proposed a bill that the plebeian tribune (the magistrate who was the chief representative of the people) did not agree with, he issued a veto, which was backed by the promise to literally "interpose the sacrosanctity of his person" (or intercessio) if the Senate did not comply. If the Senate did not comply, he could physically prevent the Senate from acting, and any resistance could be criminally prosecuted as constituting a violation of his sacrosanctity. If the vetoed motion was proposed the next day, and the plebeian tribune who had vetoed it the day before was not present to interpose himself, the motion could be passed. In general, the plebeian tribune had to physically be present at the Senate meeting, otherwise his physical threat of interposing his person had no meaning. Ultimately, the plebeian tribune's veto was based in a promise of physical force.

Once a vote occurred, and a measure passed, he could do nothing, since his promise to physically interpose his person against the senators was now meaningless. In addition, during a couple of instances between the end of the Second Punic War in 201 BC and the beginning of the Social War in 91 BC, although they had no legal power to do so, several Consuls were known to have vetoed acts of the Senate. Ultimately, if there was no veto, and the matter was of minor importance, it could be voted on by a voice vote or by a show of hands. If there was no veto, and the matter was of a significant nature, there was usually a physical division of the house, where senators voted by taking a place on either side of the chamber.

Any motion that had the support of the Senate but was vetoed was recorded in the annals as a senatus auctoritas, while any motion that was passed and not vetoed was recorded as a senatus consultum. After the vote, each senatus consultum and each senatus auctoritas was transcribed into a final document by the presiding magistrate. This document included the name of the presiding magistrate, the place of the assembly, the dates involved, the number of senators who were present at time the motion was passed, the names of witnesses to the drafting of the motion, and the substance of the act. In addition, if the motion was a senatus consultum, a capital letter "C" was stamped on the document, to verify that the motion had been approved by the Senate.

The document was then deposited in the temple that housed the Treasury (the aerarium). While a senatus auctoritas (vetoed Senate motion) had no legal value, it did serve to show the opinion of the Senate. If a senatus consultum conflicted with a law (lex) that was passed by a Roman Assembly, the law overrode the senatus consultum, because the senatus consultum had its authority based in precedent, and not in law. A senatus consultum, however, could serve to interpret a law.

== See also ==
- Byzantine Senate
- Commune of Rome (1144 onward)
- Roman Law
- Centuria
- Curia
- Quaestor
- Aedile
- Plebeian Council
- Cursus honorum
- Pontifex Maximus
- Roman Senate
- Interrex
- Procurator (ancient Rome)
- Acta Senatus
