= Giordano Pierleoni =

Giordano (sometimes anglicized as Jordan) Pierleoni (in contemporary Latin, Jordanus filius Petrus Leonis) was the son of the Consul Pier Leoni and therefore brother of Antipope Anacletus II and leader of the Commune of Rome which the people set up in 1143. According to Gregorovius, he was a “maverick” in the great Pierleoni family, for he continued to oppose the papacy after Anacletus' death, when the rest of his clan had returned to support of Rome.

== Life ==
In late autumn 1143, the democratic element in Rome set up a Senate in opposition to the higher nobility and the papacy. Drawing on the Rome's history as the once capital of the ancient Roman Republic, the citizens declared a senate, based on four elected representatives from each of the newly created fourteen districts of medieval Rome. These would be the first real senators since the seventh century. The fifty-six senators then elected as patrician Pierleoni, because the title of consul had taken on noble connotations. Pierleoni led the defence of the city against Pope Lucius II's assault in 1145, where Lucius himself was killed. However, Pierleoni was unable to maintain order in the city despite his overtures of negotiations with Lucius—demanding the pope renounce secular authority and live as a common priest before being allowed reentry into the city, —he was deposed by the people who invited Pope Eugene III, Lucius' successor, back. The power vacuum left by Pierleoni's deposition caused even more chaos, and eventually resulted in the pope leaving the city. After this, Giacomo da Vico, was elected patrician—though a man his equal, Arnold of Brescia, had arrived in the commune in 1145. Arnold would renew the commune, giving it the intellectual leadership it lacked after Pierleoni's downfall.

== Sources ==
- Gregorovius, Ferdinand. History of the City of Rome in the Middle Ages Vol. IV, part 2. trans. Annie Hamilton.
