= Pierleoni family =

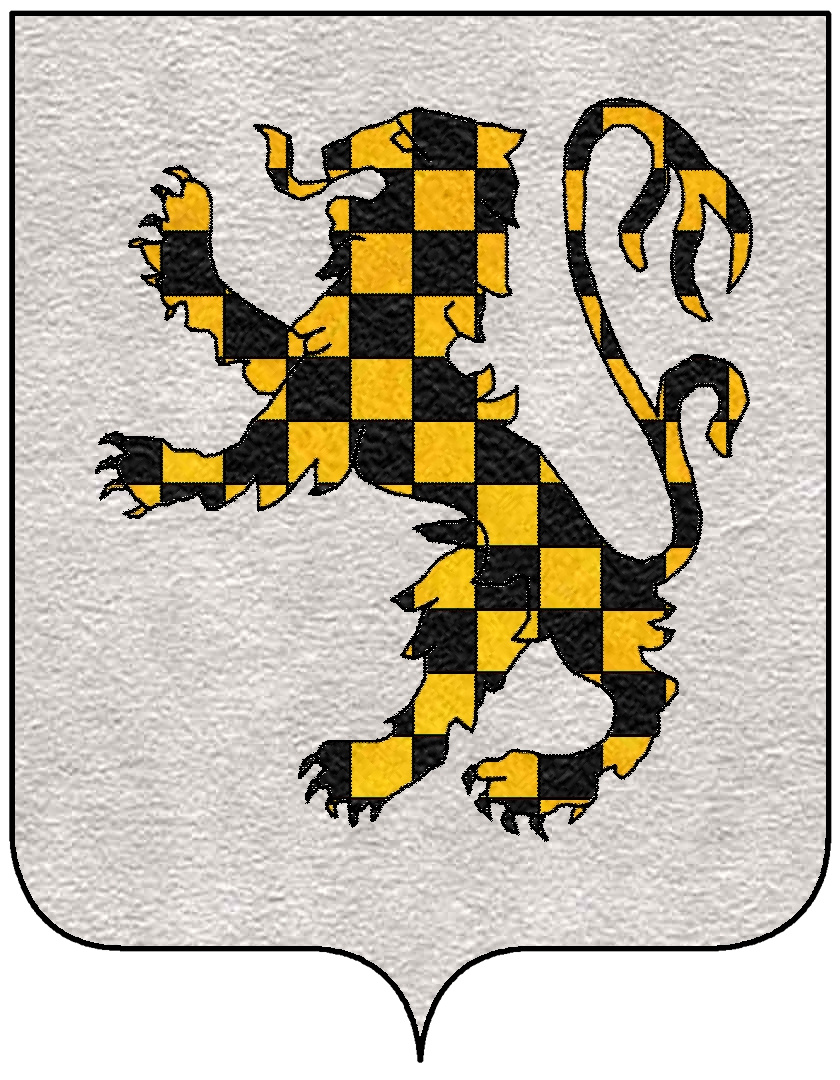
Coat of arms of Pierleoni Family

The family of the Pierleoni, meaning "sons of Peter Leo", was a great Roman patrician clan of the Middle Ages, headquartered in a tower house in the quarter of Trastevere that was home to a larger number of Roman Jews. The heads of the family often bore the title consul Romanorum, or "Consul of the Romans," in the early days.

The family descended from the eleventh-century Jewish convert Leo de Benedicto, whose baptismal name comes from the fact that he was baptized by Pope Leo IX himself. They also were bankers and financially backed the reform papacy.

While the Pierleoni during their greatness spuriously claimed to be descended from the ancient Roman noble family of the Anicii, their enemies in Rome made much of their Jewish extraction and levelled the usual charges of usury. Leo's son was the Peter Leo (Pierleone) of the name and it is his sons that garnered for the family such fame as protectors of the popes: Pope Urban II died in one of the Pierleoni's castelli, July 1099. The family's territory was expanded to include the Isola Tiberina and a further tower house near the Theater of Marcellus.

When Emperor Henry V came to Rome (1111), Petrus Leonis headed the papal legation that effected a reconciliation between the pope and the emperor. Pope Paschal II made Pierleone's son, Peter Peirleone, a cardinal, as well as bestowing the Castel Sant'Angelo on Petrus. Pierleone's attempt to install one of his sons as Prefect of Rome in 1116, though favoured by Paschal II, was resisted by the opposite party with riot and bloodshed. Peter, would later become Antipope Anacletus II (1131), and another, Giordano Pierleoni, with the revival of the Commune of Rome, became the head of the Republic as Patricius in 1144. The family generally supported the papacy and represented the Guelph faction of the city against the Ghibellines, often under the leadership of the Frangipani.

Two branches of the Pierleoni are still in existence. The first is that of Matelica and Pesaro in the Marche and the second is that of Città di Castello in Umbria.

== Image Gallery ==
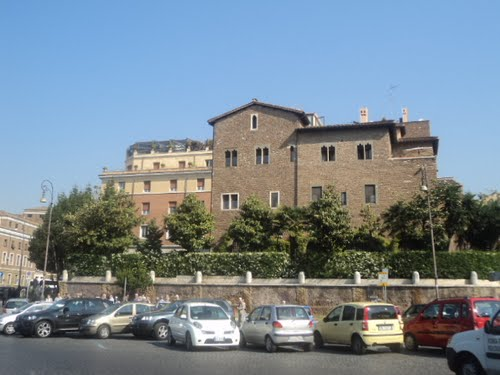
The Pierleoni houses located on the Velabrum

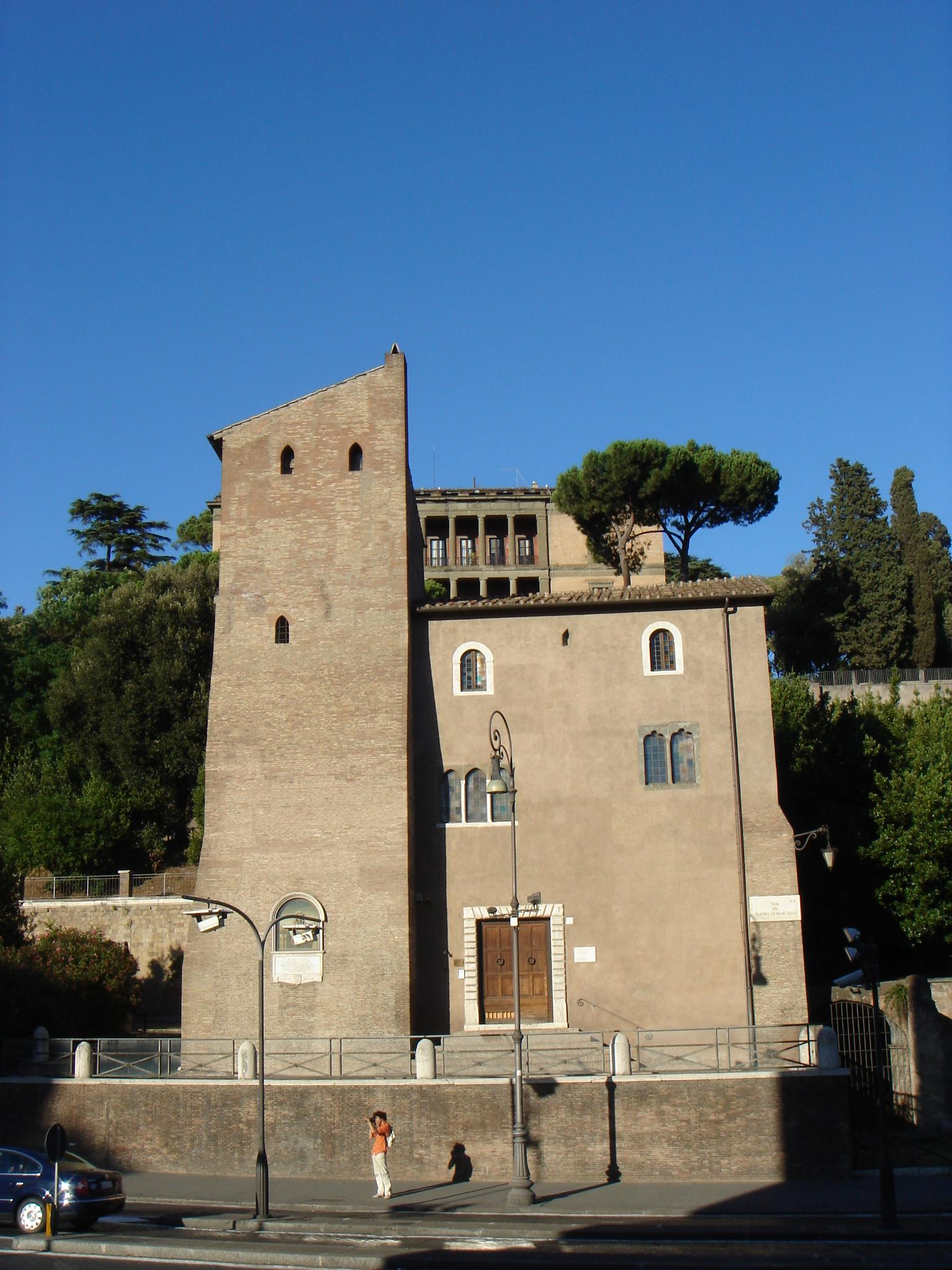
The Pierleoni Tower located in Campidoglio

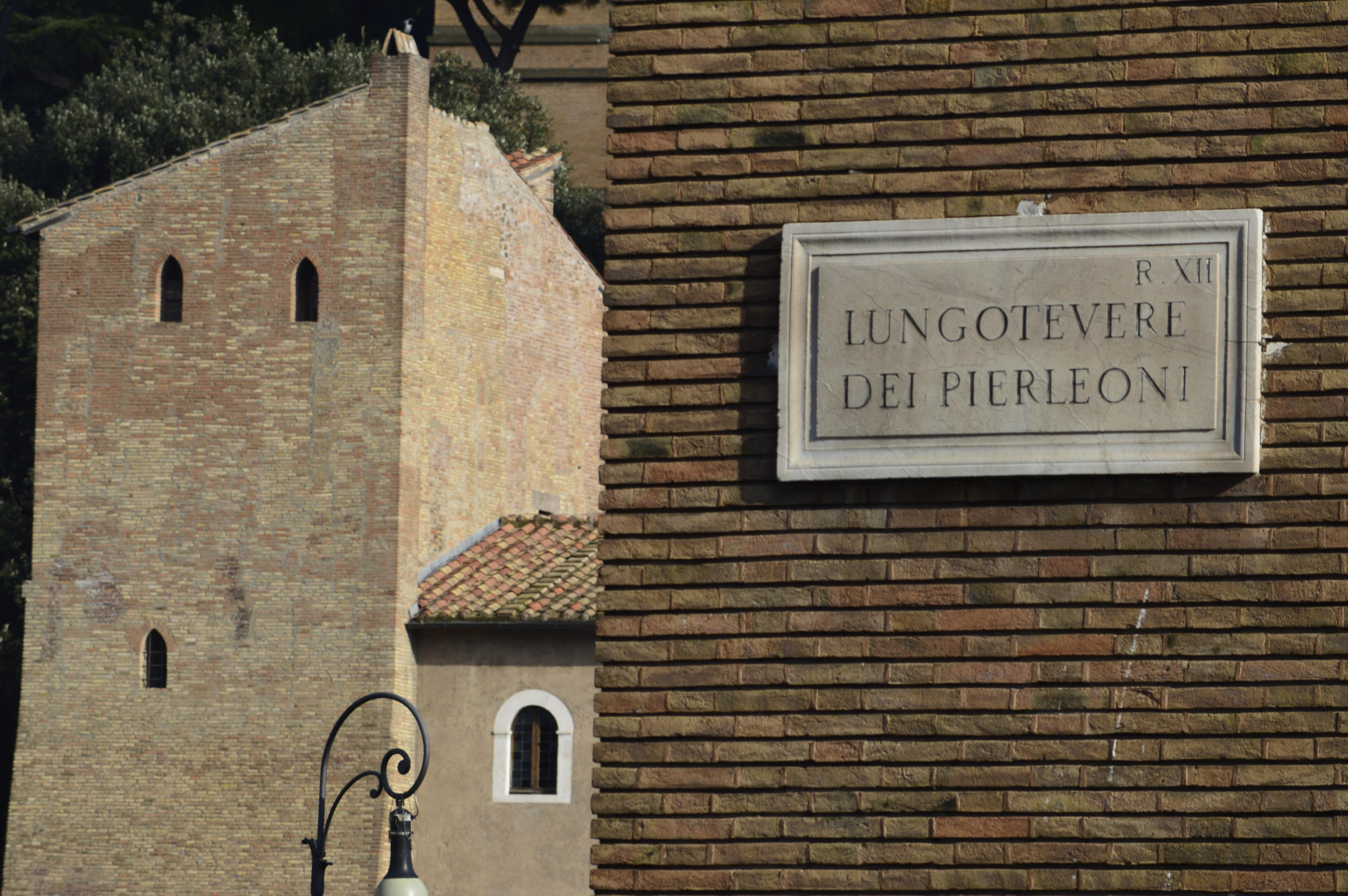
Lungotevere Pierleoni
