= Pier Leoni =

Pier Leoni (or Pierleone) (Latin: Petrus Leo or Petrus filius Leonis) (died 2 June 1128) was the son of the Jewish convert Leo de Benedicto and founder of the great and important medieval Roman family of the Pierleoni. He was called the Jewish Crassus by Gregorovius.

Pierleone himself was a consul of the eternal city in the early twelfth century. He was one of the regents of the city itself when Pope Paschal II left in 1108 to deal with raising troops. "Rome remained the pit of daily rebellion," as Gregorovius says.

In 1111, Pierleone negotiated the imperial coronation of the Emperor Henry V.

Ever a faithful ally of the pope, in 1117, he retook Rome for him, but was subsequently holed up in his tower by Ptolemy I of Tusculum.

After the election of Bishop John of Gaeta as Gelasius II on 24 January 1118, the new pope was thrown into prison by Cencio II Frangipane. It was Pierleone, with his son Peter, Peter the prefect of the city, and the papal gonfalonier Stephen the Norman, who restored the pope's freedom.

Pierleone held the Theatre of Marcellus, Tiber Island, and the Castel Sant'Angelo, fortress of the popes. He was the greatest man in Rome in his time, the grandson of a Jew of Trastevere. His large marble sarcophagus is preserved in the Basilica of Saint Paul Outside the Walls. Its inscription reads, "a man without an equal, immeasurably rich in money and children." Of these children, he left several sons: Leo, Peter (later Antipope Anacletus II), Jordan (later Patrician of the Commune of Rome), Roger, and Huguizon. It is said that his daughter married Roger I of Sicily.

== Sources ==
- Gregorovius, Ferdinand. Rome in the Middle Ages Vol. IV. trans. Annie Hamilton. 1905.
