= Flag of Rome =

Rome
- Use: Civil flag
- Adopted: 1870 (presumed)
- Design: Two equally-sized vertical stripes, purplish red on the left and ochre yellow on the right
- Use: Civil and state flag, civil ensign
- Adopted: 2004
- Design: The civil flag with the coat of arms at the centre
- Use: Gonfalon (Note: Rome has never had a decree granting a gonfalon and makes use of a large flag instead of a gonfalon. The exact date of the adoption of the gonfalon is unknown.)
- Design: Amaranth banner charged with the greater arms at the centre

The flag of Rome (bandiera di Roma), the capital city of Italy, is a bicolour rectangle of two equally-sized vertical stripes, purplish red on the left and ochre yellow on the right.

== State flag ==
The state flag of the city includes the coat of arms in the centre of the aforesaid civil flag. It consists of the yellow (golden) Greek cross near the top left corner, and to its right, the yellow (golden) letters SPQR (an abbreviation for Senatus Populusque Romanus, which translates from Latin to The Roman Senate and People), placed diagonally, from top left to bottom right, across the red Heater-style escutcheon (shield) with square top and pointed base. On the top of the shield is placed a yellow (golden) open crown, crown with five flowers, and with red, white, and green jewels.

== History ==
Since the Middle Ages, the city of Rome used a purplish-red banner with a yellow (golden) Greek cross near the top right corner, and to its right, the yellow (golden) letters SPQR (an abbreviation for Senatus Populusque Romanus, which translates from Latin to The Roman Senate and People), placed diagonally across the banner, from the top left to the bottom right corner.

It is believed that the modern flag design, with the red and yellow vertical stripes, was introduced in 1870, the year when the city was incorporated into the Kingdom of Italy. In 1884, the city officially introduced its coat of arms, which then began being displayed on the state flag variant. Its design was based on a wall carving dating back to the 14th century, which depicted the oldest representation of the city coat of arms. The colours were based on the flag. In the centre of the coat of arms was a purplush-red oval, depicting the yellow (golden) Greek cross in the top left, and to its right, the yellow (golden) letters SPQR (an abbreviation for Senatus Populusque Romanus, which translates from Latin to The Roman Senate and People), placed diagonally, from top left to bottom right, across the oval. The oval was placed within a yellow (golden) Baroque-style escutcheon with scroll-eared top, and lobed base. Above it was placed a yellow (golden) open crown with five flowers and the crown jewels. Senatus Popolusque Romanus (SPQR) was officially adopted as the city motto on 26 August 1927.

The coat of arms design was used from 1884 to 2004, when it was replaced with the current, simplified design, including the change to simplified red Heater-style escutcheon (shield) with square top and pointed base. Subsequently, the new design began being featured on the civil flag.

The flag in use until 2004 had a Baroque-style coat of arms in the center, with a scroll frame and a floral crown, of rather variable shape. It was usually exhibited on the Palazzo Senatorio, the representative seat of the municipality of Rome in Piazza del Campidoglio. Flags with coats of arms even more complicated than the one shown here are known, taken from sculptural specimens.

The banner of Rome, used in the Middle Ages.

The state flag of Rome, used from 1884 to 2004.

Gonfalon illustration with all the external ornaments
