= Antipope Anacletus II =

Antipope from 1130 to 1138

- Papacy began: 1130
- Papacy ended: January 25, 1138
- Predecessor: Roman claimant: Honorius II; Antipapal claimant: Celestine II
- Successor: Roman claimant: Innocent II; Antipapal claimant: Victor IV
- Opposed to: Pope Innocent II

Personal details
- Born: Pietro Pierleoni
- Died: January 25, 1138 Rome
- Residence: Rome
- Parents: Pier Leoni

Anacletus II (died January 25, 1138), born Pietro Pierleoni, was an antipope who ruled in opposition to Pope Innocent II from 1130 until his death in 1138. After the death of Pope Honorius II, the college of cardinals was divided over his successor. Unusually, the election was entrusted to eight cardinals, who elected Gregorio Papareschi as Innocent II. A larger body of cardinals then elected Pierleoni, which led to a major schism in the Roman Catholic Church. Anacletus had the support of most Romans, including the Frangipani family, and Innocent was forced to flee to France. North of the Alps, Innocent gained the crucial support of the major religious orders, in particular Bernard of Clairvaux's Cistercians, the abbot of Cluny Peter the Venerable; and Norbert of Xanten, the archbishop of Magdeburg who established the Premonstratensians and held a high rank in the court of Emperor Lothar III.

The lack of support from these key figures left Anacletus with few patrons outside of Rome. Anacletus, with little remaining support, lived for several years and died with the crisis unresolved. In 1139 the second Lateran Council ended the schism, although opinion remained divided.

== Life ==
Pietro was born to the powerful Roman family of the Pierleoni, the son of the consul Pier Leoni. One of his great-great grandparents, Benedictus, maybe Baruch in Hebrew, was a Jewish banker who converted to Christianity. As a second son with ambitions, Pietro was destined for an ecclesiastical career. He studied in Paris and entered the Benedictine Abbey of Cluny. Later he went to Rome and occupied several important positions.

== Election ==
In 1130, Pope Honorius II lay dying and the cardinals decided that they would entrust the election to a commission of eight men, led by papal chancellor Haimeric, who had his candidate Cardinal Gregorio Papareschi hastily elected as Pope Innocent II. He was consecrated on February 14, the day after Honorius' death.

On the same day, the other cardinals, led by the senior Cardinal Bishop, Pietro of Porto, met with the leaders of Rome in the Basilica of S. Marco, and announced that Innocent had not been canonically elected. He nominated Cardinal Pietro Pierleoni, a Roman whose family were the enemy of Haimeric's supporters the Frangipani, who was elected by the Cardinals, clergy, nobility and People of Rome. Anacletus' supporters included the entire Roman aristocracy, with the exception of the Frangipani, and the majority of the Cardinals. With the support of the People, and in opposition to the French Haimeric, the Pierleoni were powerful enough to take control of Rome, while Innocent was forced to flee north of the Alps.

== Conflict ==
North of the Alps, Innocent gained the crucial support of St. Bernard of Clairvaux, Peter the Venerable, and other prominent reformers who helped him gain recognition from European rulers such as Emperor Lothair, leaving Anacletus with few patrons. Anacletus had been a relatively acceptable candidate for the Papacy, being well-respected, so rumors centering on his descent from a Jewish convert were spread to blacken his reputation. Bernard of Clairvaux wrote: "It is a disgrace for Christ that a Jew sits on the throne of St. Peter's." Among his supporters were Duke William X of Aquitaine, who decided for him against the will of his own bishops, and the powerful Roger II of Sicily, whose title of "King of Sicily" Anacletus had approved by papal bull after his accession.

By 1135 Anacletus' position was weak despite their aid, but the schism only ended with his death in 1138, after which Gregorio Conti was elected as Victor IV but submitted to Innocent within a month. Innocent returned to Rome and ruled without opposition, quickly convening the Second Lateran Council in 1139 and reinforcing the Church's teachings against Usury, clerical marriage, and other practices.

Though the Pierleoni family mostly submitted to Innocent and his successors, Anacletus' brother Giordano, who was then leader of the Commune of Rome, actively opposed these successors in the following decade.

== See also ==
- Papal selection before 1059
- Papal conclave (since 1274)

== Sources ==
- Arnulfi Sagiensis, Episcopus Sexoviensis, "Tractatus de schismate orto post Honorii II papae decessum," Ludovico Antonio Muratori (editor), Rerum Italicarum Scriptores Tomus III, pars 1 (Milano 1723), pp. 423–432.
- Anastasio, Lodovico Agnello (1754). Istoria degli Antipapi di Lodovico Agnello Anastasio arcivescovo di Sorrento. Tomo primo. Napoli: Stamperia Muziana.
- Zigarelli, Daniello Maria (1859). Storia degli antipapi e di taluni memorabili avvenimenti delle epoche rispettive dello scisma. Napoli: Tipografico di G. Gioja.
- Richard, Étienne (1859). Étude historique sur le schisme d'Anaclet en Aquitaine de 1130 à 1136 (in French). Poitiers: Henri Oudin.
- Zöpffel, Richard. Die Papstwahlen und die mit ihnen im Zusammenhange stehenden Ceremonien von 11.–14. Jahrhunderts (Göttingen 1871), 267–395.
- Fedele, Pietro (1904). Le famiglie di Anacleto II e di Gelasio II. Roma. [Archivio della Real Società Romana di Storia Patria 27, 1904, pp. 399–440].
- Brixius, J. M. Die Mitglieder des Kardinalkollegiums von 1130–1181 (Berlin 1912).
- Mann, Horace K. The Lives of the Popes in the Middle Ages Volume IX. 1130–1159 (London 1914), 1–66.
- Bloch, Herbert (1952). The Schism of Anacletus II and the Glanfeuil Forgeries of Peter the Deacon of Monte Cassino. New York: Fordham University Press.
- Zenker, Barbara. Die Mitglieder des Kardinalcollegiums von 1130 bis 1159 (Würzburg 1964).
- Hüls, Rudolf. Kardinäle, Klerus und Kirchen Roms: 1049–1130 (Tübingen 1977) [Bibliothek des Deutschen Historischen Instituts in Rom, Band 48].
- Stroll, Mary (1987). The Jewish Pope: Ideology and Politics in the Papal Schism of 1130. New York: E. J. Brill. ISBN 978-9004085909.
- Stroll, Mary (1991). Symbols As Power: The Papacy Following the Investiture Contest'url=https://books.google.com/books?id=yzrkey-3VUgC. New York & Leiden: Brill. ISBN 978-90-04-09374-4.
- Houben, Herbert (2002). Roger II of Sicily: A Ruler Between East and West. Cambridge: Cambridge University Press. ISBN 978-0-521-65573-6.
- Fryde, Natalie (2002). "Abelard and the Church's Policy towards the Jews". In Gillingham, John (ed.). Anglo-Norman Studies XXIV: Proceedings of the Battle Conference 2001. The Boydell Press. pp. 99–108.
