= Togatus Barberini =

Roman marble sculpture

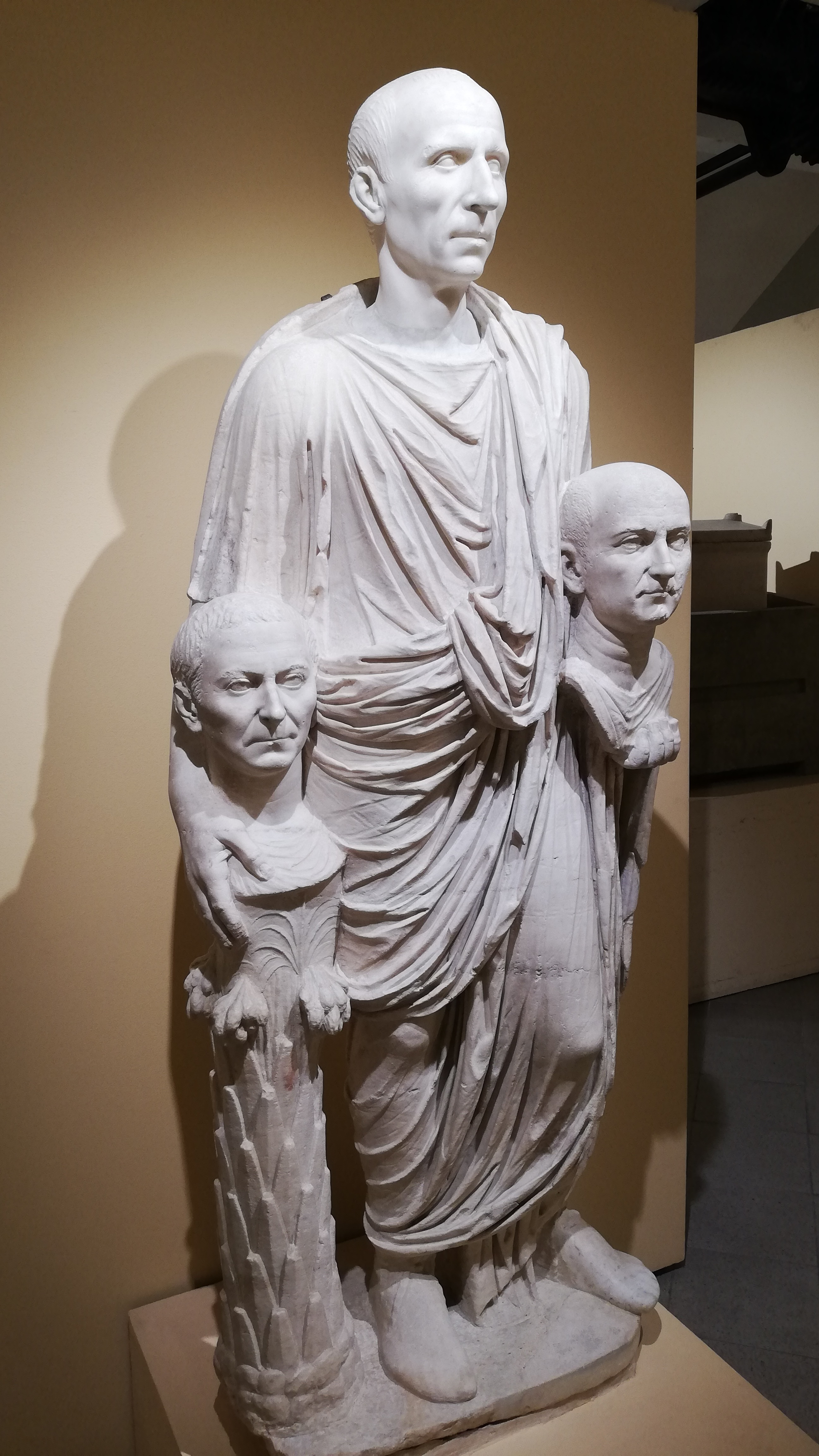
- Year: 1st Century BCE
- Medium: Marble
- Dimensions: 165 cm (65 in)
- Location: Capitoline Museums; Rome; 41.8931°N 12.4825°E
- Owner: Capitoline Museums
- Accession: MC 2392

Togatus Barberini is a Roman marble sculpture from around the first-century AD that depicts a full-body figure, referred to as a togatus, holding the heads of deceased ancestors in either hand. It is housed in the Centrale Montemartini in Rome, Italy (formerly in the Capitoline Museums). Little is known about this sculpture and who it depicts, but it is speculated to be a representation of the Roman funerary practice of creating death masks.

== Speculation of identity ==
Little is known about the identity of those depicted in the sculpture, but it is known that the type of shoes the middle figure is depicted to wear distinguishes him as a member of the Roman noble class. From this small bit of information, many theories have risen in speculation of the true identity of the center figure, but little evidence has been provided to back up many of these claims and as such they remain only theories.

Recent research has suggested that the statue represents a patrician senator, holding the heads of his ancestors. The head on the right is that of a famous general, which is evident thanks to the palm-tree support. Furthermore, it is now known that the head and body of the middle figure do not, in fact, belong to each other, evident due to the marble of the head and body being of different types and colors (the head being a white marble and the body being a yellow). This is made more evident due to the toga's finish from behind and the evidence of the restoration of the nose and ears.

According to Zoega, the figure is supposed to represent Brutus, holding the severed heads of his two sons, while others claim that instead it is the portrait of a sculptor. Others still believe the prominent figure to be that of Julius Caesar, while many simply claim that the figure is an unknown Roman senator.
