= 14 regions of Medieval Rome =

During the Middle Ages, Rome was divided into a number of administrative regions (Latin: regiones), usually numbering between twelve and fourteen, which changed over time.

== Evolution of the regions ==
Originally the city of Rome had been divided by Augustus into 14 regions in 7 BC. Then sometime during the 4th century, Christian authorities instituted seven ecclesiastical regions, which ran parallel to the civil regions. With the collapse of Imperial authority in the Western Roman Empire after the death of Julius Nepos in 480, much of the old Imperial administrative structures began to fall into abeyance.

After the destructive Gothic Wars of the 6th century, the city of Rome had become virtually depopulated. When the city began to recover it was inhabited in new parts and whole districts were in ruins. Consequently, the Augustan regions then had no relationship to the administration of the city, but continued to be used as a means for identifying property. As Rome slowly recovered from the wars, it became necessary to organize the city for the purpose of defence, and one theory contends that this was the origin of the 12 medieval regions. In particular, it is suggested that they were connected with the Byzantine military system (the scholae militiae) and were introduced into Rome in the 7th century, along with their implementation at Ravenna. This saw the creation of a new series of regions based upon a different principle from either of the older ones. However, this revision did not last much longer than two centuries after the fall of the Exarchate of Ravenna in 751.

The division of the city according to the revised civil and ecclesiastical regions appears to have fallen out of use in the confusion of the 10th century. Local variations seem to have sprung up that were adopted, used and then discarded as the years progressed. It has been conjectured that the sack of Rome by Robert Guiscard in 1084 caused a displacement of the population which probably made a revision of the regions necessary. The district from the Lateran Palace to the Colosseum was engulfed and ruined by fire, and the Caelian and Aventine hills were gradually abandoned. The number of regions needed for the south and south-east of the city became smaller, while there emerged a greater need for the organization of the rapidly growing districts to the north-west and along the Tiber.

== Tenth-century boundaries ==
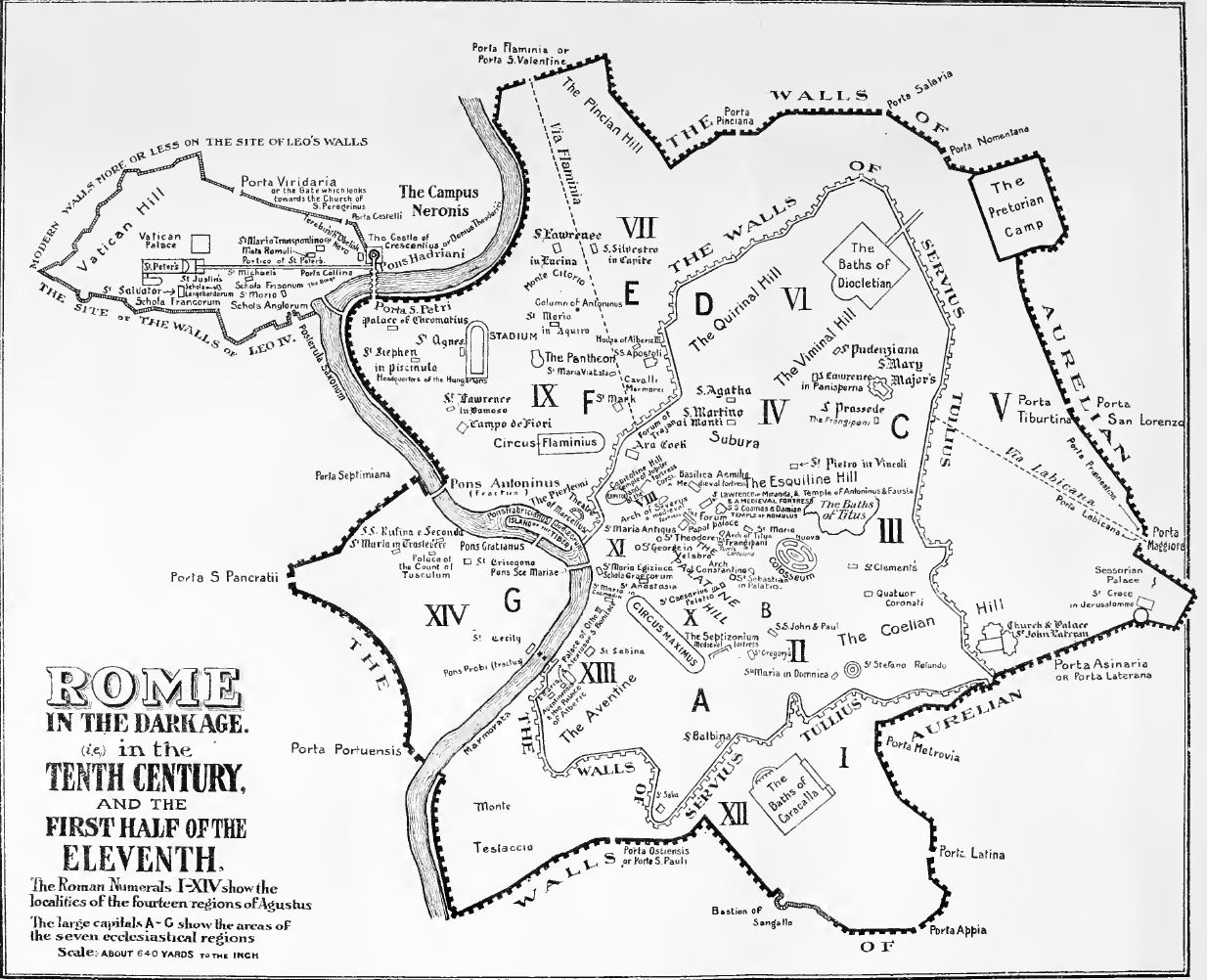
A map of the city of Rome in the 10th and 11th centuries

During the 10th century, it appears that there were only 12 regions in use, and their names, locations and boundary divisions bear very little relationship to the subsequent revisions of the regions. Their locations within the city of Rome are as follows:

The first region was called the Horrea, named after the granaries located within it. At that time it included all the Aventine Hill and stretched across the Marmorata and the Ripa Graeca, butting up against the banks of the Tiber.

The second region included the Caelian Hill, a section of the Palatine Hill, and stretched southward to the foot of the Aventine Hill. It incorporated the areas around Santi Quattro Coronati, the Aqua Claudia (between the Caelian and Palatine hills), the Circus Maximus, the Septizodium and the Porta Metronia. Both of these regions were merged during the 12th century to form Ripe et Marmorate.

The third region largely corresponded to the old fifth Augustan Region (Esquiliae). It contained Porta Maggiore, Santa Croce in Gerusalemme, the modern Via Merulana, the Arch of Pietas and the Porta Tiburtina.

The fourth region contained the church of Sant'Agata and most likely the Quirinal and Viminal hills. It also contained the Suburra and the Baths of Diocletian.

The fifth region contained the part of the Campus Martius which housed the Mausoleum of Augustus, the Column of Marcus Aurelius, the Via Lata and the church of San Silvestro in Capite. It probably also contained the Porta Pinciana and the modern Porta del Popolo.

The sixth region, called Biveretica, presumably named after the monastery of Saint Andrew known as Sant'Andrea de Biveretica, which was situated between the Santi Apostoli and the Column of Trajan, meaning it included at least part of the old Augustan seventh region, the Via Lata. This region included the church of Santa Maria in Trivio, so it was probably centered near the main output for the Aqua Virgo aqueduct, which is supported by the name of the region, a corruption of the Latin Bibere ('to drink'). This region was absorbed into the subsequent region of Trivii et Vie Late.

The seventh region contained the area around the Column and Forum of Trajan, and a part of the Suburra.

The eighth region was called Sub Capitolio, and it contained the area of the Roman Forum and the Colosseum, so this region corresponded to the old eighth Augustan region of Rome.

The ninth region was given the label ad Scorticlarios, named after the tanners quarter which was situated next to the Baths of Nero. Apart from the Baths, this region also contained the church of Sant'Eustachio, Piazza Navona, the Pantheon and San Lorenzo in Lucina. It also included most of the Campus Martius. It broadly corresponded to the later medieval region of Campi Martis et S. Laurentii in Lucina.

The tenth region was referred to as Regione Marcello ('Region of Marcellus'), meaning that this region was centered around the Theatre of Marcellus which had been part of the ninth region of Imperial Rome (the Circus Flaminius).

The eleventh region is not identified. Given the geographic spread of the other regions, it is most likely identical to the largely depopulated 1143 region of Arenule et Caccabariorum.

The twelfth region was known as the Piscina Publica and was identical to the old Augustan region. It contained the Baths of Caracalla.

== List of the 14 regions of 1143 ==
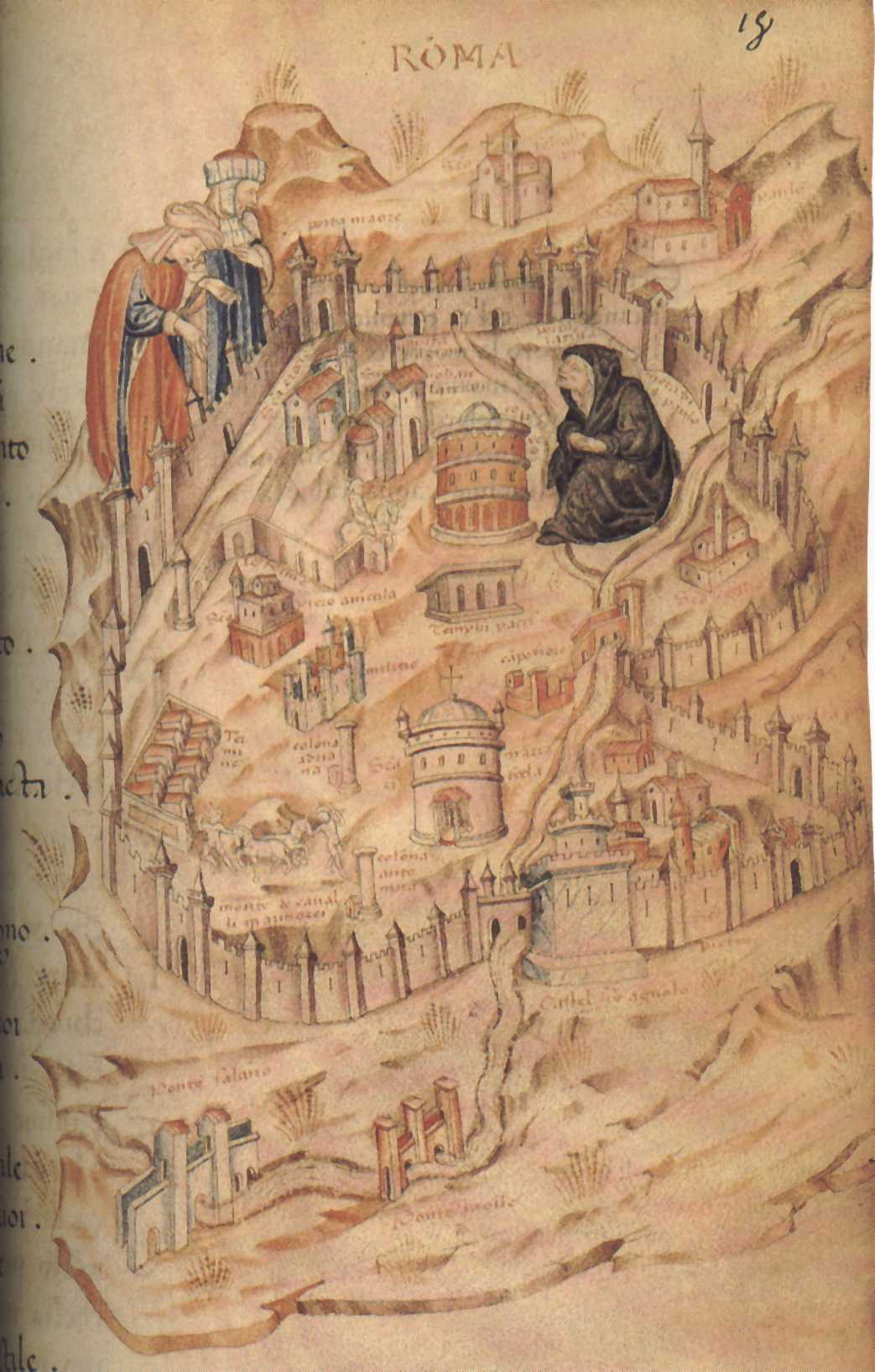
Drawing of Rome during the 14th century

The next major reform was after the revolution of 1143 and the establishment of the Commune of Rome, as the city was redivided into 14 regions. There was a minor adjustment made in the 13th century, bringing the total number down to 13. It was not until 1586 that another region was created, bringing the total number back to 14. Rome kept these administrative divisions intact until the 19th century.

Unlike the Augustan regions of Rome, the medieval regions were not numbered, and few had any relationship to the ancient Roman divisions. They are numbered here merely for convenience.

=== I Montium et Biberatice ===
By the 12th century, the older 10th century region of Biveretica had its name changed to Montium et Biberatice, before simply becoming Montium at the close of the 14th century. This change of name reflected the fact that the Esquiline and Viminal Hills, and parts of the Quirinal and Caelian Hills belonged to this rione during the Middle Ages. Like many of the regions at the time, the hilltop areas were abandoned, as the population sought to remain close to the Tiber River, and so only the part of the region that contained the easternmost part of the Campus Martius was inhabited.

By 1143 the region also contained the Forum Romanum and the Colosseum, which was not part of the older Montium et Biberatice. The Colosseum had at some point during the Middle Ages been fortified and for a time belonged to the area controlled by the Frangipani family.

In the beginning of the 16th century this region included part of the district in the neighbourhood of Forum of Trajan, and by the 19th century, the region then referred to as Monti had a boundary which passed between Trajan's Forum and the Santi Apostoli.

=== II Trivii et Vie Late ===
A region that is believed took its name from absorbing part of the Via Lata, the old Seventh Region of Augustan Rome, while the Trivii described the three principal streets that led to the "piazza dei Crociferi", a square next to the modern Trevi square. The importance of this location in Medieval Rome is that it was the main output for the Aqua Virgo aqueduct, one of the few aqueducts which underwent frequent restoration works during the centuries. By its remaining active it enabled the region to survive well throughout the Middle Ages, although the change of its sources caused the water's properties (purity, taste, etc.) to become much worse than the original one, which was only restored during alteration works in 1562.

During the Middle Ages, the higher reaches of the region (which included part of the Quirinal Hill) were abandoned, as the people chose to inhabit the parts of the region closer to the Tiber River, and during the 9th century, this region was the aristocratic quarter of Rome. Its name was transformed in modern times to become the region of Trevi.

=== III Columpne et S. Marie in Aquiro ===
This region included parts of the city situated around its most prominent features, the Column of Marcus Aurelius, or Antonine Column (late 2nd century), now standing in Piazza Colonna and the Church of Santa Maria in Aquiro. It also contains the remains of the Temple of Hadrian, with its eleven columns also contributing to the name of the region. A prominent feature during the Middle Ages was the Mons Acceptorius, a small artificial embankment created by the pre-Roman inhabitants in order to drive stilts into the swampy ground, and build dry huts for housing. Prior to the 16th century, the region was never densely populated. It now forms part of the modern rione of Colonna.

=== IV Campi Martis et S. Laurentii in Lucina ===
Included the parts of Rome around the Campo Marzio and San Lorenzo in Lucina.

=== V Pontis et Scorteclariorum ===
Included the parts of Rome around Ponte. Unlike its modern counterpart, it included the area across the Tiber spanned by the Ponte Sant'Angelo. This bridge was built by Emperor Hadrian (and originally named after him Pons Aelius) in 134 to connect his mausoleum to the rest of the city.

In ancient Rome, the area belonged to the IX Augustan region called Circus Flaminius, that was a part of the Campus Martius. Nero built another bridge, that was called Neronianus or triumphalis because the Via Triumphalis, the Triumphal Way, passed over it: Starting with Titus, the victorious Emperors celebrating their Triumphs entered Rome marching through it.

Nero's bridge was also called Pons Vaticanus (meaning 'Vatican Bridge' in Latin), because it connected the Ager Vaticanus to the left bank, later Pons Ruptus ('broken bridge'), because it was already broken in the Middle Ages.

Pope Sixtus V eventually changed the rione limits so that the Ponte Sant'Angelo belonged to Borgo.

=== VI S. Eustachii et Vinea Teudemarii ===
Included the parts of Rome around the church of Sant'Eustachio and forms part of the modern rione of Sant'Eustachio.

=== VII Arenule et Caccabariorum ===
The name of the region stemmed from Arenula, (the name is present in the modern Via Arenula) that was the name given to the soft sand (Italian: rena) that the river Tiber left after the floods, and that built strands on the left bank. It included parts of the city around Regola.

In Augustan Rome, the medieval region straddled both the Campus Martius and the IX region called Circus Flaminius. Here there was the Trigarium, the stadium where the riders of the triga (a cart with three horses) used to train. During the early Middle Ages, it belonged to the 4th of the seven ecclesiastic regions.

The region was not widely inhabited due to the frequent flooding of the river Tiber, causing the whole area to be extremely unhealthy, especially during summer. It was only drained at the end of the Middle Ages, after which it was reclaimed by the city and reinhabited once again.

=== VIII Parionis et S. Laurentii in Damaso ===
During Antiquity, it belonged to the 9th Augustan region called Circo Flaminio. In this area Pompey built his curia, while Domitian built his stadium and an Odeon (Odeum), for musical and poetic competitions. During the early Middle Ages it included parts of the city around San Lorenzo in Damaso. From 1200 the population kept on increasing until the 15th century, when it increased in importance due to the paving of Campo de' Fiori, so that it soon became an important economic center.

Under Sixtus IV (1471–1484) the rione lost much of its chaotic look, typical of the Middle Ages, for a cleaner and tidier one, in keeping with the changes brought about by the Renaissance. It saw the recovery of buildings, the enlargement of streets, and the rebuilding of the ancient Pons Aurelius into a new bridge, the "Ponte Sisto" connecting Trastevere and Parione. This activity improved the quality of the region.

Thanks to this renewal, urbanization increased between the 1400 and 1500. In the same period, several artists were asked to renew the front of the most important of the buildings in the region. In 1500, most of the commercial activity slowly moved from Campo de' Fiori to Piazza Navona, due to the fact that it had more space for trading.

Today it is part of the modern rione of Parione.

=== IX Pinee et S. Marci ===
At the beginning of the 10th century, this region was referred to as Pina before transforming into Pinee et S. Marci by the 12th century, and finally into Pigna by the 16th century. For many centuries this region has been reckoned as the ninth region, certainly parts of it, such as the Pantheon were included in the ninth region of Augustan Rome.

From at least the 16th century, and possibly much earlier, this region has been centered on the Basilica of San Marco, Santa Maria sopra Minerva and the Pantheon.

=== X S. Angeli in Foro Piscium ===
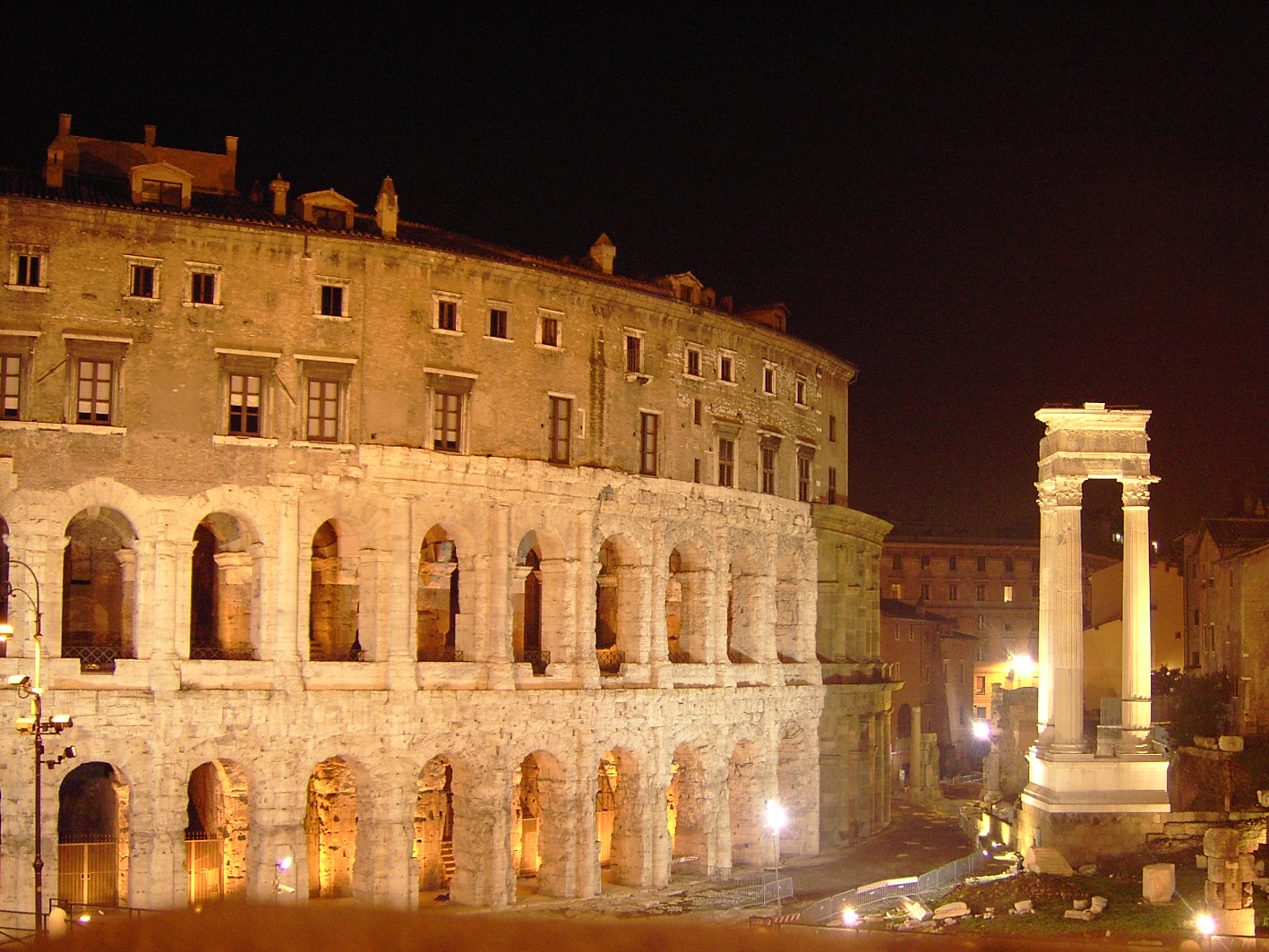
The Theatre of Marcellus, after which a region of Rome was named in the 10th century

Referred to as Regione Marcello in the tenth century, by the 12th century, its name had changed to indicate that it included parts of the city around the fish market, which had moved from the Forum Piscarium, located near the Forum Romanum, into the ruins of the Porticus Octaviae, though it still included the Theatre of Marcellus, which now housed the shops of smiths and coppersmiths inside the arcades of the theater.

It also included the most important church of the rione, Sant'Angelo in Foro Piscium ('St. Angel in the Fish Market'). This church, erected in 770 inside the Propylea of the Portico of Octavia, had a great historical importance during the Middle Ages. From here, on the Whitsunday of 1347, the Romans, led by Cola di Rienzo, launched the assault on the Capitol, attempting to restore the Roman Republic.

This region now forms part of the region of Sant'Angelo.

=== XI Ripe et Marmorate ===
Includes part of the city that bounded on the east bank of the old Port of Rome, the Ripa Grande ('Great Bank'), it was constructed after the Second Punic War, and was only abandoned in the 19th century. The area of the Marmorate referred to the river bank south of the Aventine Hill where, since the imperial age, rough blocks of different kinds of marble (marmora), shipped to Rome from the East, were stored in a large deposit area, called the emporium.

During the period of the high empire, a number of rich mansions stood here but they were mostly destroyed during the barbarian invasions of the 5th century, resulting in the area being almost completely abandoned, with the exception of a few convents on the heights of the Aventine Hill, located on a safer spot. The district became again inhabited during the Renaissance, when sometime during the 16th century the river port called Ripa Grande was made operational once again.

During the 13th century, the section where the Arch of Janus is located was included by the Frangipani family in their fortified estate, which stretched over the Palatine Hill and included the remains of the small Frangipani Tower at the southern end of the Circus Maximus, which was also within this region. The area also had the headquarters of the Knights Templar in Rome from the 11th to the 13th centuries.

The region incorporated parts of today’s Via Marmorata, and forms part of the modern rione of Ripa.

=== XII Campitelli et S. Adriani ===
During the 10th century, this region was referred to as the Clivus Argentarii, and it contained the streets that now connect the Corso with the Forum Romanum (the old Via di Marforio). It includes parts of the city around the Piazza di Campitelli, near Santa Maria in Campitelli, and forms part of the modern rione of Campitelli. It also included the church of Sant'Adriano al Foro.

=== XIII Trastevere ===
Originally a separate region in 1143 from the Tiber Island, these two regions were combined in the 13th century, bringing the total number of regions down to thirteen.

=== XIV Insula Tiberina ===
The Tiber Island. After its amalgamation with the region of Trastevere, Rome did not get a fourteenth region until 1586 when Sixtus V added the old Leonine City, considered until then outside the city, as a new administrative division, under the name of Borgo.
