= Ferdinand Gregorovius =

German historian (1821–1891)

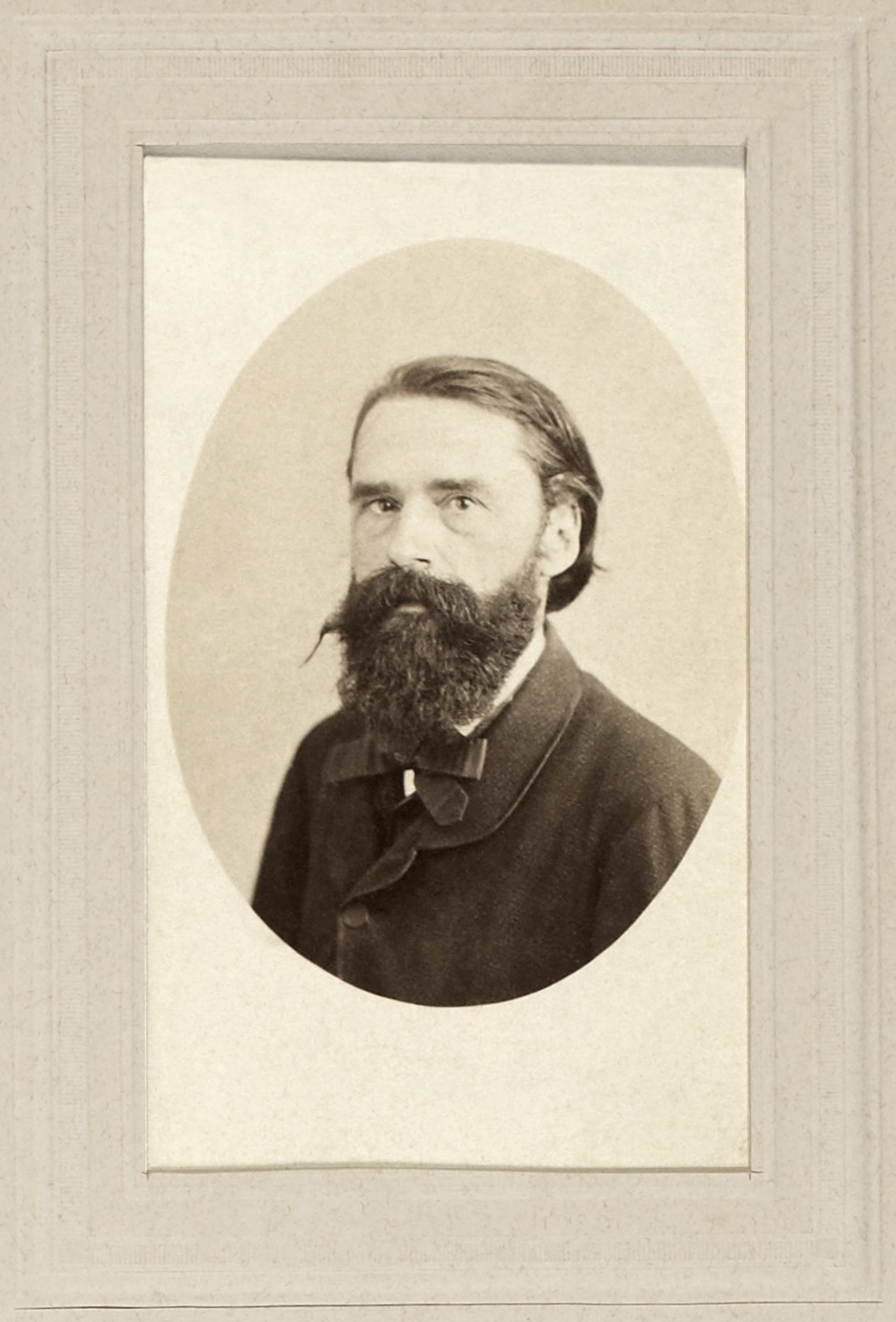
- Collodion portrait of Gregorovius taken during his time in Rome
- Born: Ferdinand Adolf Gregorovius; January 19, 1821; Neidenburg, East Prussia, Kingdom of Prussia
- Died: May 1, 1891 (aged 70); Munich, Kingdom of Bavaria, German Empire

Academic background
- Education: University of Königsberg
- Thesis: Plotini de pulcro doctrina (1843)
- Academic advisor: Karl Rosenkranz

Academic work
- Discipline: History
- Sub-discipline: Medieval history
- School or tradition: Romanticism
- Main interests: History of Rome
- Notable works: Wanderjahre in Italien

Ferdinand Adolf Gregorovius (German: [ˈfɛʁdinant ˈaːdɔlf ɡʁeɡoˈʁoːvi̯ʊs]; 19 January 1821 – 1 May 1891) was a German historian who specialized in the medieval history of Rome.

== Biography ==
Gregorovius was the son of Neidenburg district justice council Ferdinand Timotheus Gregorovius and his wife Wilhelmine Charlotte Dorothea Kausch. An earlier ancestor named Grzegorzewski had come to Prussia from Poland. Members of the Gregorovius family lived in Prussia for over 300 years, and produced many jurists, preachers and artists. One famous ancestor of Ferdinand's was Johann Adam Gregorovius, born 1681 in Johannisburg, district of Gumbinnen.

Gregorovius was born in Neidenburg, East Prussia in the Kingdom of Prussia (now Nidzica, Poland), and studied theology and philosophy at the University of Königsberg. In 1838, he joined the student association, the Corps Masovia. After teaching for many years, Gregorovius took up residence in Italy in 1852, where he remained for over twenty years. In 1876, he was made an honorary citizen of Rome, the first German to be awarded this honor. A street and a square are named after him. He eventually retired to the Kingdom of Bavaria, where he died in Munich.

He is best known for Wanderjahre in Italien, his account of the travels on foot that he took through Italy in the 1850s, and the monumental Die Geschichte der Stadt Rom im Mittelalter (transl. History of Rome in the Middle Ages), a classic for Medieval and early Renaissance history. He also wrote biographies of Pope Alexander VI and Lucrezia Borgia, as well as works on Byzantine history and medieval Athens, and translated Italian authors into German, among them Giovanni Melis.

== Reputation ==
According to Father John Hardon SJ, Gregorovius was "a bitter enemy of the popes", while quoting him reflecting in wonder at the late medieval reform of the Church following the tenth century's Saeculum obscurum. An earlier Catholic writer, the historian Charles George Herbermann, described Gregorovius as

"a historian of undoubted authority, a Protestant, and by no means an admirer of the Papacy. On the civil history of the popes during the middle ages there is, perhaps, no greater authority, for whilst completely at home among modern writers who have dealt with his subject, he has, wherever he could, had recourse to the original sources."

== Works ==
- Der Ghetto und die Juden in Rom, Mit Einem Geleitwort von Leo Baeck, Im Schocken Verlag/Berlin, 1935 (originally published, 1853)
- Der Tod des Tiberius ("Tiberius' Death", 1851)
- Geschichte des römischen Kaisers Hadrian und seiner Zeit ("History of the Roman Emperor Hadrian and His Times", 1851)
  - The Emperor Hadrian (1898 translation by Mary E. Robinson)
- Siciliana (1853)
- Corsica (1854); Corsica (1855 trans. by Edward Joy Morris)
- Göthe’s Wilhelm Meister in seinen socialistischen Elementen entwickelt. Schwäbisch Hall: E. Fischhaber, 1855.
- Geschichte der Stadt Rom im Mittelalter (1859–1872) Translated into English 'The History of Rome in the Middle Ages' (1894–1902). (reissued by Italica Press, 2000–2004.); (reissued by Cambridge University Press, 2010. ISBN 978-1-108-01513-4)
  - Anne Hamilton's trans. of the 4th German edition
- "Wanderjahre in Italien". spiegel.de. 1856–1877. Archived from the original on 27 January 2003.
- Die Insel Capri (1868); The island of Capri (1879 trans. by Lilian Clarke)
- Geschichte der Stadt Athen im Mittelalter. Von der Zeit Justinians bis zur türkischen Eroberung ("History of Athens in the Middle Ages. From Justinian to the Turkish Conquest", 1889)
- Lucrezia Borgia: Nach Urkunden und Correspondenzen ihrer eigenen Zeit (Lucrezia Borgia: a chapter from the morals of the Italian Renaissance, 1874)
  - John Leslie Garner's trans. of the 3rd German edition
- Die Grabmäler der Römischen Päpste (The Tombs of The Roman Popes), first edition 1857 in German (Google Books link), later in 1881 as Die Grabdenkmäler der Päpste (The Tombs of The Popes) (Open Library link) and in English as The Tombs of the Popes (tr: Louisa W. Terry) Victoria Press, Rome 1904 (Google Books link)
- Die Insel Capri – Idylle vom Mittelmeer (1897)
  - M. Douglass Fairbairn's trans.
