= Commune of Rome =

Medieval Roman political regime from 1143 to 1398

Commune of Rome Communis Romae
- 1143–1398
- Banner of Arms Coat of arms
- Status: Semi-autonomous city-state
- Capital: Rome
- Common languages: Medieval Latin
- Legislature: Senate of the Commune of Rome
- Historical era: Medieval
  - Established: 1143
  - Pope Clement III recognizes a certain autonomy to the city of Rome: 1188
  - Pope Martin V abolishes the city's autonomy, placing it under direct papal control: 1398
Preceded by	Succeeded by
Papal States	Papal States

The Commune of Rome (Latin: Communis Romae) was a semi-autonomous, citizen-led political regime established in the city of the same name, whose emergence can be included within the process of constitution of urban communes in Northern Italy (11th-12th centuries). As a political-administrative entity, the Commune of Rome, with its physical headquarters on the Capitoline Hill, was made up of governing and representative bodies (Arengum or Parlamentum, Senate and Council), justice and finance whose jurisdiction presumably included, from north to south, from the Paglia bridge in Radicofani to Ceprano and, from east to west, from Carsoli to the coastline.

== History ==
=== The quest for autonomy and renovatio Senatus (1143) ===
After two years of conflict with Rome (1141-1143), neighbouring Tivoli had finally been subjected to the authority of Pope Innocent II (1130-1143), who nevertheless forbade the Romans to tear down its walls or to take reprisals against the Tiburtines. For this reason, between August and October 1143, the Roman citizens, encouraged by the reformist preacher Arnold of Brescia, rebelled against the then Pope, Lucius II and proceeded to renew the old Senate on the Capitoline Hill. This episode, known as the renovatio Senatus, is considered the founding act of the Commune of Rome, but its formation nevertheless responds to a process that began in the 11th century. In fact, the Roman quest for autonomy outside papal authority has as its earliest references the prominent presence of laici potenti in the public courts of the 11th century, the emergence of courts of justice specialized in the resolution of professional disputes, the granting of an important commercial privilege to the Abbey of Monte Cassino in 1127 by six Roman citizens acting on behalf of the city and, above all, the configuration of an armed militia composed of members of noble families that acted independently of papal authority. In this sense, the citizen nobility gathered in arms against Tivoli forms a key element to understand the evolution of the Commune of Rome, which is nourished by its cadres from the revolt of 1143 onwards.

=== Winning autonomy (1143-1188) ===
From its foundation until 1188, the Commune of Rome enjoyed almost complete autonomy from the Papacy, with which it came to dispute its lordships in Latium (Tivoli, Albano Laziale, Tuscolo) based on a policy of communal expansion, as well as the control of cereal production between Viterbo and the Tyrrhenian Sea, the imposition of taxes, the administration of justice in the territories of Sabina, Tuscia and Campagna e Marittima and even the power to consecrate emperors, regardless of the final decision of the Germanic claimants.

=== Papal recognition of the Commune ===
In 1188, the Commune of Rome reached an agreement with Pope Clement III (1187–1191) by which it returned to the pontiff some of the powers lost since 1143 (the right to mint coins, royalties, etc.) and also undertook to respect cardinals, clerics and visitors, to return the revenues and properties of the churches previously plundered, to perform military service to the pontiff and to swear allegiance to him as lord of the city. The commune, for its part, obtained from the Papacy not only official recognition of its existence and its territorial aspirations over Tuscolo, but also reparations, donations and financial contributions.

=== The election of the sole senator and the appearance of the medianus ===
In 1191, following a popular revolt demanding communal autonomy from the Papacy, the Commune of Rome saw its system of government modified, represented by the Senate, through the election of a single senator; a collegiate senatorial magistracy, controlled by representatives of opposing aristocratic factions, which could be compared, in a certain way, to that of consul and/or podestà in the rest of the communes of northern Italy. From then on, the Senate began to form a subordinate council, which would eventually split into a general council, composed of the caporioni and the consuls of the Arts of Rome, and a special council, of more restricted composition. Likewise, the services that initially depended on the authority of the Senate began to organize themselves autonomously.

Exceptionally, although notably noticeably, between 1198 and 1205 Pope Innocent III (1198-1216) appointed himself a medianus; a figure whose role was to elect a senator from among the Guelph and/or Ghibelline families who would remain loyal to the pontiff. Such interference would on more than one occasion provoke the noble families to revolt whenever the leadership of the Commune fell to one faction or another, so much so that the split into two opposing parties made the instability of the political environment evident.

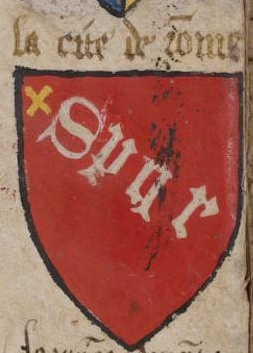
Contemporary depiction of the coat of arms, c.1400

=== The 1234 revolt in defense of communal autonomy ===
While the historian Paolo Brozzi paints an accurate picture of the Roman revolt of 1234, the causes of the revolt are unknown. However, it is noted that it was led by Senator Luca Savelli, his collaborators Pietro Parenzo and Giovanni Cenci, and the merchant classes in response to the poor relations between the Commune and Pope Gregory IX. The demands of the popolo grasso were to extend the communal jurisdiction to Anagni, Segni, Velletri, Viterbo and Montalto to the detriment of the Papacy and to annul the peace of 1188 in order to recover powers such as the free election of the Senate, the minting of coins or the right to collect taxes. Having requested military assistance against the Romans, Frederick II of Hohenstaufen came to the aid of Gregory IX and together they finally defeated the communal troops at Viterbo.

The implications of the revolt of 1234 ended with the restitution to the Papacy of all the territorial conquests made by the Commune, the liberation of the prisoners, the payment of compensation due for the sacking of St. John Lateran and the cardinal's houses, the recognition of the privilege of the ecclesiastical jurisdiction and the tax immunity of the Roman churches and the promise not to harass pilgrims or clerics and to be at peace with the emperor and with the cities of Campagna e Marittima, Sabina, etc. However, despite the considerable obligations demanded by the Pope, he for his part renounced the right to freely elect the senators of the corporation, the right to mint coins and the collection of gabelles, so that by this act the papal authority implicitly returned and recognized the powers for which the Commune had risen up against its lord.

=== Popular phase (1252-1347) ===
Between 1252 and 1347, Rome experienced no less than a dozen political changes, mostly due to popular movements of varying intensity that interrupted the government of the barons for short periods of time, so that power fell into the hands of a college of magistrates with unknown functions called boni viri reformatores reipublicae (1256), boni homines (1266; 1312; 1327; 1342), anziani (1305), priores (1338), or shared functions with podestà and/or foreign princes. This last trend was not different from that of the rest of the Italian cities in which placing part of the power in the hands of foreign podestà and/or foreign princes (symbolically, in this case) sought the execution of reforms favorable to the citizen nobility and the components of Arts and Crafts. In the Roman case, however, the election of foreign officials was a novelty, since the origin of communal offices until 1252 was always local. However, from the election of Brancaleone degli Andalò as podestà (1252-1259) onwards, the Roman commune would experience a series of personalist mandates, such as those of Charles I of Anjou (1263-1266; 1268-1278; 1281-1284) or Robert I of Anjou (1313-1326; 1328-1336).

With the transfer of the papal seat to Avignon under Pope Clement V (1305-1314), Rome was plunged into power struggles between barons and populars until the arrival of the outsiders Giovanni da Ignano and Paganino della Torre, who served in 1305 as senator and captain of the people, respectively, with the aim of restoring order.

Five years later, Pope Clement V consented to the repeal of the Fundamenta of Pope Nicholas III and the election of Louis of Savoy as senator, who unsuccessfully dedicated himself to ending the conflict between the Orsini and Colonna families, who returned to hold and share power in the city from 1312. The brief appointment of Jacopo Arlotti of the Stefaneschi as Capitano del popolo, seen as a mandate of punishment against the great families involved in the disorders, was followed in 1313 by the papal appointment of Robert of Naples as senator.

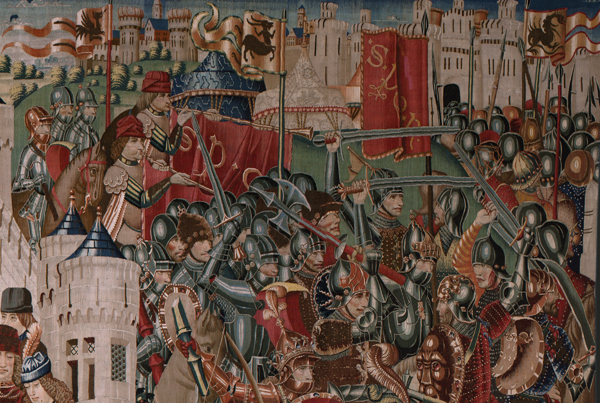
15th century depiction of the City of Rome

=== The Rome of Cola di Rienzo (1347-1354) ===
Engulfed in internal divisions of an aristocratic nature, Rome witnessed in 1347 the rise of a figure who sought to end the baronial hegemony of the Commune: Cola di Rienzo. His figure, although shrouded in shadow, is one of the best known by Italian medievalist historiography thanks to the Cronica del Anonimo Romano, which narrates several of the political events that took place in the Eternal City between 1325 and 1357.

Rienzo, born in Rome around 1313 into a poor family, belonged to the guild of notaries and was married to the daughter of a notable. His great wit and eloquence, combined with the vast culture accumulated from reading Livy, Virgil, Dante Alighieri and Petrarch, soon earned him an important position among the magistrates of the city, whose government had been in the hands of the popular Stefano Colonna since 1338. On the occasion of the death of Pope Benedict XII (1334-1342), Rienzo took the lead in an embassy parallel to the official one, led by Stefano, with the aim of obtaining from the new pontiff, Pope Clement VI (1342-1352), the proclamation of the jubilee year. Thanks to his friendship with Petrarch and the latter's connections with Cardinal Colonna at the Avignon See, Rienzo was appointed notary of the Apostolic Camera and returned to Rome in 1344 to attack the misrule of the thirteen priors from his position in the communal assectamentum, while attracting the people with his harangues. After the discovery in 1347 of the lex regia de impero on a bronze plaque in St. John Lateran, Rienzo claimed for Rome the powers that belonged to it de jure, fascinated by the idea of restoring the greatness of the Roman Empire.

=== Final period (late 14th century) ===
When Pope Gregory XI returned to Rome in 1377, ending the Avignon period, he found a city in the grip of anarchy due to the struggles between the noble and popular factions, and in which his power was now more formal than real. Forty years of instability followed, characterized at a local level by the conflict of power between the Commune and the Papacy, and at an international level by the great Western Schism between the Roman Popes and the Avignon antipopes, at the end of which Martin V of the Colonna family, the only Roman Pope of the fifteenth century, was elected Pope by mutual agreement between the parties . His return and that of the Papal institution to Rome was strongly desired and obtained by Catherine of Siena. Martin V succeeded in bringing order to the city, reconstituting its now lost civic identity, and laying the foundations for its rebirth.

== Battles ==
- 1145 – Battle against Tivoli, Italy.
- 1167 – Battle of Monte Porzio against Holy Roman Emperor, Tusculum and Albano Laziale.
- 1170 – Destruction of Albano Laziale.
- 1191 – Destruction of Tusculum.

== See also ==
- History of Rome#Roman Commune
- 14 regions of Medieval Rome

== Sources ==
- Gregorovius, Ferdinand. History of the City of Rome in the Middle Ages, Vol IV, Part 2.
- John of Salisbury. The Historia Pontificalis
