= Graziella al Porto Napoli =

- Chiesa di Santa Maria delle Grazie al Porto Napoli
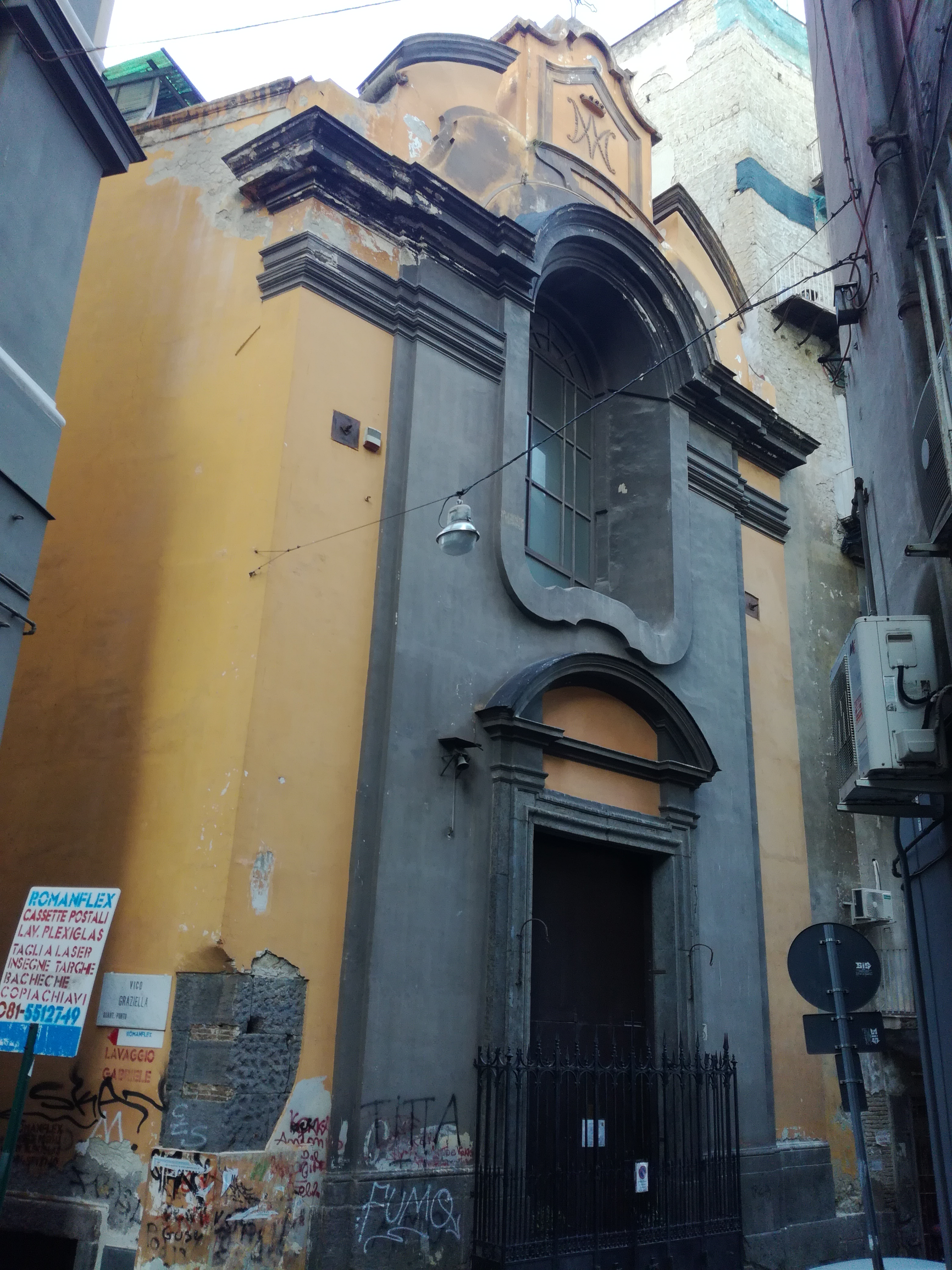
- Façade of the church
- Graziella al Porto Napoli
- 40.8418°N 14.2531°E
- Location: Naples
- Country: Italy
- Denomination: Roman Catholic

Architecture
- Style: Baroque architecture
- Years built: 1737

Administration
- Archdiocese: Roman Catholic Archdiocese of Naples

The church of the Graziella al Porto Napoli or Santa Maria delle Grazie al Porto Napoli is a small Roman Catholic church in Naples, Italy. The church is just behind the church of Pietà dei Turchini, on vico Graziella al Porto. It is accessible through narrow alleys from via Medina, along the church of San Diego all'Ospedaletto and the former Royal Conservatory, but also by pedestrian alleys from via Guglielmo San Felice and via De Pretis. It is located in the rione San Giuseppe Carità.

In 1737, the architect Angelo Carasale, in order to signal his gratitude to the providence granted by the Virgin, decided to erect this church, initially named Santa Maria delle Grazie. Carasale had found success when he was granted direction of the Teatro San Bartolomeo by King Charles III. The church was in the custody of the Mercedarian order until 1801, when it was transferred to the Confraternity of Santi Bernardo e Margherita. That group merged in 1859 with the Confraternity of Santa Maria Visita Poveri. Since the 1980 Irpinia earthquake the church has remained closed, like many other nearby churches including Santa Barbara dei Cannonieri and San Giacomo degli Italiani.

The main altar has a canvas of the Virgin granting a banner to San Pietro Nolasco by Giuseppe Bonito and two lateral canvases Madonna and San Carlo Borromeo also by Bonito, and a Crucifixion by M. Rossi. San Pietro Nolasco was the founder of the Mercedarian order.
