= Crescenzio =

Crescenzio (pronounced [kreʃˈʃɛntsjo]) is both an Italian form of the male name Crescentius and a surname. It may refer to:

== Given name ==
- Crescenzio Gambarelli (fl. 1591–1622), Italian painter
- Crescenzio Grizi or Crescentius of Jesi (died 1263), Italian Friar Minor
- Crescenzio Nomentano or Crescentius the Younger (died 998), Roman politician and aristocrat
- Crescenzio Onofri (1634–1712/14), Italian painter, draughtsman and engraver
- Crescênzio Rinaldini (1925–2011), Italian-Brazilian Roman Catholic prelate
- Crescenzio Sepe (born 1943), Italian Roman Catholic cardinal
- Crescenzio de Theodora or Crescentius the Elder (died 984), Roman politician and aristocrat

== Surname ==
- Antonello Crescenzio (fl. 16th century), Italian painter
- Antonio Crescenzio (fl. 15th century), Italian painter
- Giovanni II di Crescenzio or John II Crescentius (died 1012), Roman politician and aristocrat
- Mario Crescenzio (1942–2024), Italian politician
- Pier Crescenzio or Pietro de' Crescenzi (1230/35–c. 1320), Italian jurist and writer on agriculture

== See also ==
- Crescenzi
- Crescenzo
