= Crescenzi =

Crescenzi (pronounced [kreʃˈʃɛntsi]) is an Italian surname derived from the given name Crescenzo or Crescenzio. Notable people with the name include:

- the following members of the Roman aristocratic family of Crescentii:
  - Alessandro Crescenzi (cardinal) (1607–1688), Italian Roman Catholic cardinal
  - Giovanni Battista Crescenzi (1577–1635), Italian painter and architect
  - Marcello Crescenzi (1500–1552), Italian Roman Catholic cardinal
  - Marcello Crescenzi (bishop of Assisi) (died 1630), Italian Roman Catholic prelate
  - Ottaviano dei Crescenzi Ottaviani (1095–1164), Ghibelline antipope as Victor IV
  - Pier Paolo Crescenzi (1572–1645), Italian Roman Catholic cardinal
- Alessandro Crescenzi (born 1991), Italian footballer
- Alexander Crescenzi (fl. 17th century), Italian mathematician, translator and scholar
- Andrew Crescenzi (born 1992), Canadian ice hockey player
- Luca Crescenzi (born 1992), Italian footballer
- Pierluigi Crescenzi, Italian computer scientist and academic
- Pietro de' Crescenzi or Pier Crescenzi (1230/35–c. 1320), Italian jurist and writer on agriculture
- Ugo Crescenzi (1930–2017), Italian politician
