= Crescenzo =

Crescenzo (pronounced [kreʃˈʃɛntso]) is both an Italian form of the male name Crescentius and a surname. Notable people with the name include:

== Given name ==
- Crescenzo Alatri (1825–1897), Italian writer
- Crescenzo D'Amore (1979–2024), Italian cyclist
- Crescenzo della Gamba (fl. 1749–1783), Italian painter

== Surname ==
- Angelo Crescenzo (born 1993), Italian karateka
- Casey Crescenzo (born 1983), American singer, songwriter, multi-instrumentalist and producer
- Delilah DiCrescenzo (born 1983), American runner
- Eduardo De Crescenzo (born 1951), Italian singer, songwriter and multi-instrumentalist
- Lauren De Crescenzo (born 1990), American cyclist
- Luciano De Crescenzo (1928–2019), Italian writer, film actor and director
- Luigi De Crescenzo (born 1964), known as Pacifico, Italian singer, songwriter, composer and musician
- Lydia de Crescenzo, Italian fashion designer
- Maria Luisa De Crescenzo (born 1992), Italian actress
- René Crescenzo (1901–1975), known as René Sarvil, French actor

== See also ==
- Crescenzi
- Crescenzio
