= Giunti =

Giunti may refer to:

== People ==
- Federico Giunti (born 1971), Italian former footballer
- Ignazio Giunti (1941–1971), Italian racing driver.
- Lucantonio Giunti or Giunta (1457–1538), Florentine book publisher and printer
- Massimo Giunti (born 1974), former Italian cyclist

== Other ==
- Giunti (printers), an Italian family of printers active from the 15th to the 17th century
- Giunti Editore, an Italian publisher founded 1956
