= Santa Barbara dei Cannonieri =

Church building in Naples, Italy

Coordinates: 40.842450°N 14.253910°E

The church of Saint Barbara of the Gunners or Santa Barbara dei Cannonieri or Santa Barbara dei Cannonieri e dei Marinai is a small religious edifice in central Naples, Italy. It is located on Rua Catalana, near the church of San Giacomo degli Italiani. The church embedded in the Castel Nuovo of Naples, has also been called Santa Barbara (or by other sources, San Sebastiano).

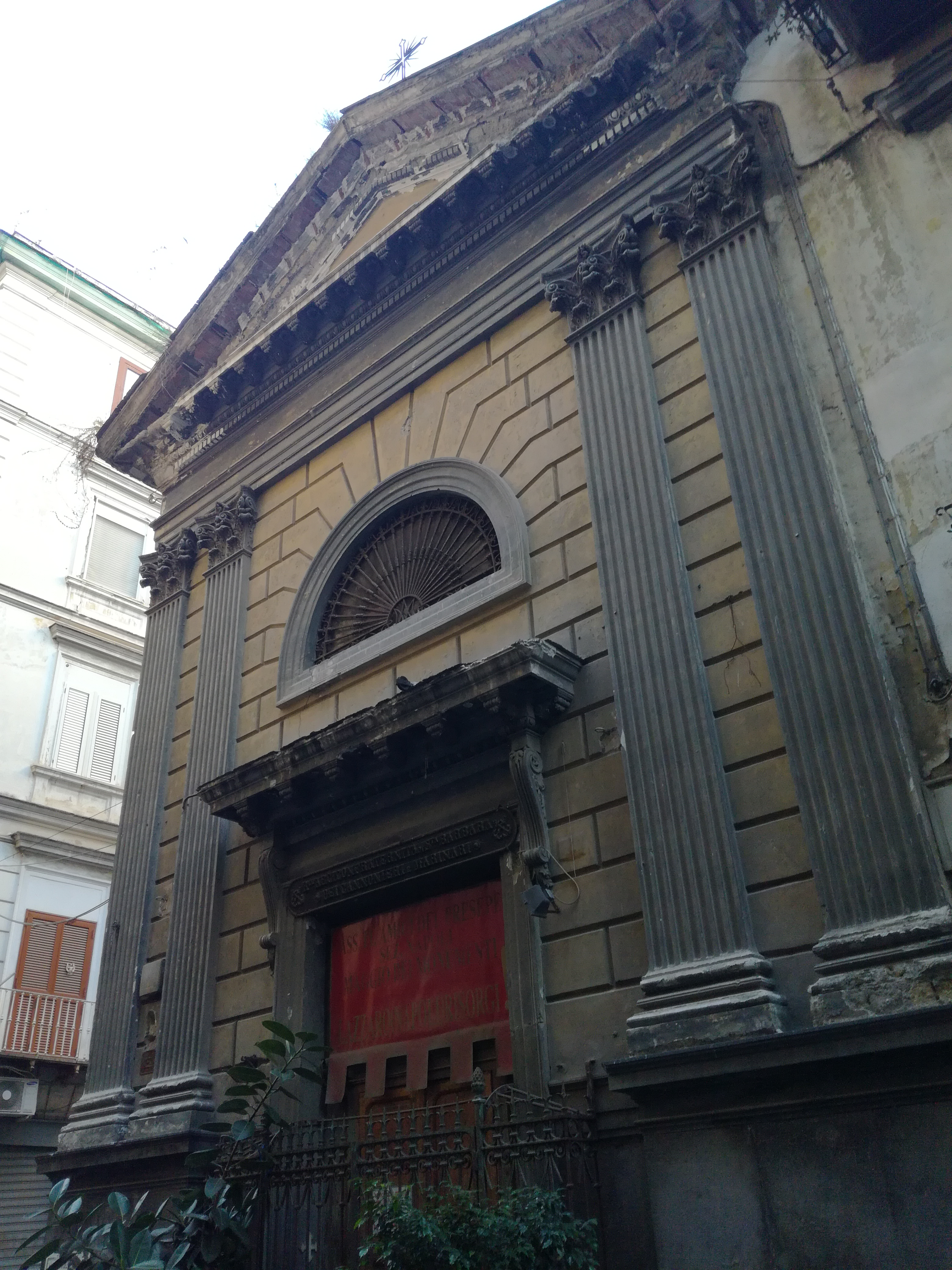
Facade

== History ==
This church has hosted many groups over the years. Initially built over the remains of a 14th-century church by commission of the Serguidone family; it was called Santa Maria dell' Incoronatella, (to distinguish it from the larger church of the Incoronata). By the late 16th century, the church housed the confraternity of the Bianchi, who founded a music conservatory in 1583, called the Conservatory of the Pietà. This group soon moved to a new site on Via Medina. The church became a parish church. In the early 17th century, it housed another confraternity, that of Santa Maria della Pietà, and the church became known as Pietatella (to distinguish it from the larger church of Pietà dei Turchini). The present building was moved to this present site on Rua Catalana in the 19th century to wide vico Pietatella, to create via dei Griffi.

In 1564, a confraternity dedicated to Saint Barbara, patronized by artillery gunners of the Royal Marine, established their first church at the church of San Giovanni a Mare near the Borgo degli Orefici. In 1727, the confraternity moved to the church of Santa Maria della Pietà dei Remolari. That church was demolished in 1940 during urban renewal, and the confraternity moved here. Till 1960, this church was the center of celebrations in a festival of Santa Barbara, including processions and fireworks, and sponsored by the Associazioni dei Corpi della Marina e degli Artiglieri. It fell in disuse, and was deconsecrated in 1981.

== See also ==
- San Giacomo degli Italiani, Naples
