= Johannes Engel =

German astronomer and physician

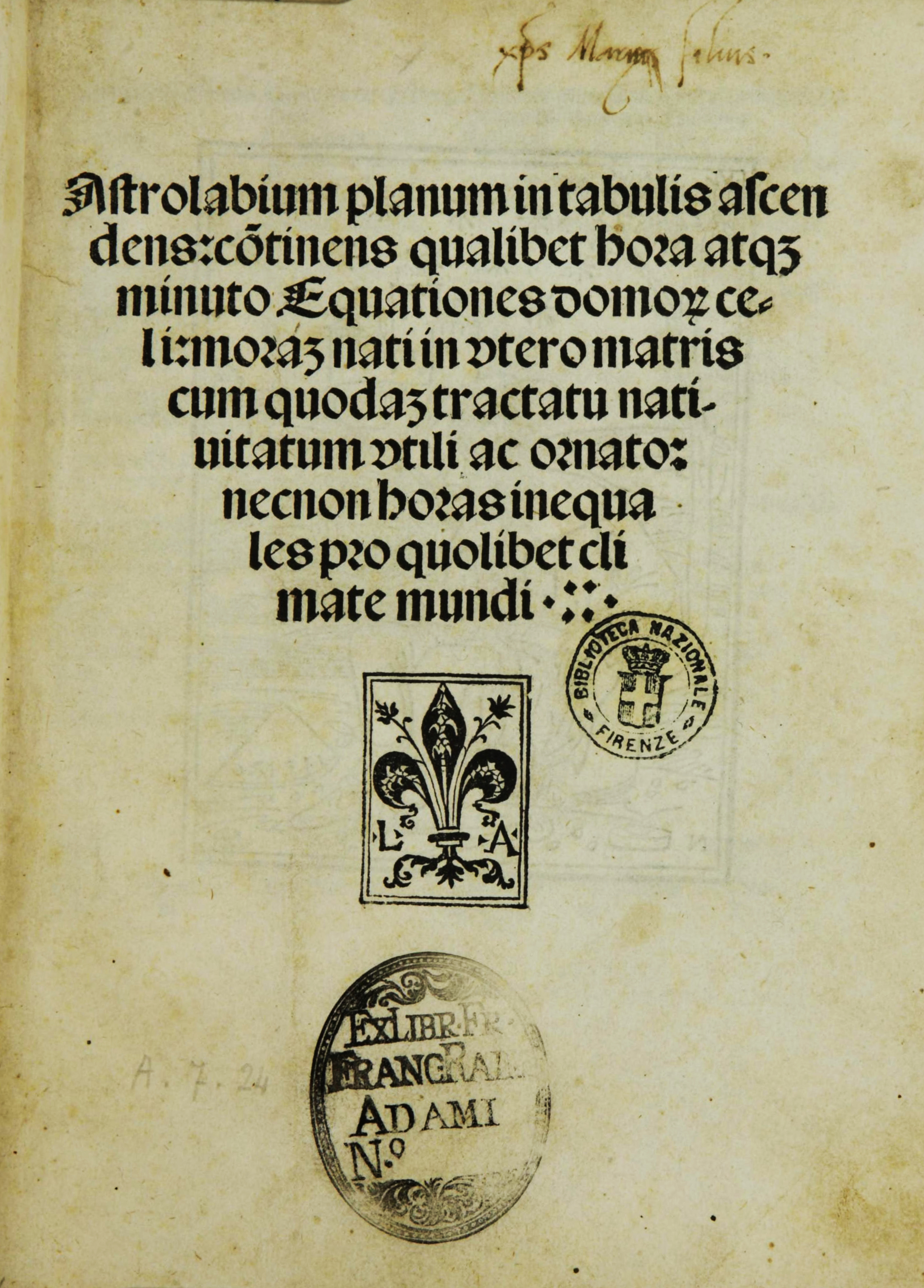
- Title page of the Astrolabium, printed by Johann Emerich for Lucantonio Giunti, Venice 1494
- Born: 2 March 1453; Aichach, Holy Roman Empire
- Died: 29 September 1512 (aged 59); Vienna, Holy Roman Empire
- Other names: Iohannes Angelus; Johannes Angelus; Joannis Angelus; Joannes Bavarus Angelus
- Occupations: doctor, astronomer
- Known for: Astrolabium planum, 1488

Johannes Engel (2 March 1453 – 29 September 1512), also known as Johannes Angelus, was a doctor, astronomer and astrologer from Aichach, near Augsburg, which at that time was a Free Imperial City within the Holy Roman Empire. He practiced medicine in Vienna, and published numerous almanachs, planetary tables and calendars. His Astrolabium planum was published by Erhard Ratdolt of Augsburg in 1488; a second edition was printed by Johann Emerich for Lucantonio Giunti in Venice in 1494.

== Life ==
Engels was born at Aichach, near Augsburg in Bavaria, probably on 2 March 1453. He registered at the University of Ingolstadt in the summer of 1472, the year of its foundation, and graduated as a Master of Arts in 1474; in 1476 he gave lectures on Aristotle at the university. From 1489 to 1491 Engel worked as a proof-reader or editor for the noted printer Erhard Ratdolt of Augsburg, who had previously worked in Venice and had published many works on astronomy. Between 1492 and 1497 Engels studied medicine at the University of Ingolstadt. He later practiced medicine in Vienna, where on 29 September 1512 he died.

== Works ==
From 1484 Engel began to publish almanachs and astrological calendars, in both German and Latin. His Astrolabium planum, with many tables of astrological calculation and 360 examples of horoscopes, was published by Erhard Ratdolt in Augsburg in 1488. A second edition was printed by Johann Emerich for Lucantonio Giunti in Venice in 1494, and subsequently reprinted by Giunti in 1502.

Engel's edition of the De magnis coniunctionibus, Latin translations by Jean de Séville (Johannes Hispalensis) of works by the ninth-century astronomer and astrologer Abu Ma'shar al-Balkhi of Baghdad, was published by Ratdolt in 1489, and was influential in the development of the astrological theory of planetary conjunctions. Ratdolt's edition of the Tabule directionum profectionumque of Regiomontanus, printed in 1490, has corrections by Engel. In 1491 Ratdolt printed Engel's edition of the Decem tractatus astronomiae of the thirteenth-century mathematician and astrologer Guido Bonatti of Forlì.

The Ephemerides coelestium motuum usque ad annum 1500 of 1494 was printed in Vienna by Johannes Winterburger, the first Viennese printer, who also printed the undated Almanach novum atque collectum … super anno domini 1510.

Engel's brief treatise on the plague, Tractat von der Pestilentz Joanni Engel … was printed posthumously in Augsburg by Sigmund Grimm and Marx Wirsung, on 4 November 1518.

== Publications ==
Among the publications of Johannes Engel as author or editor are:

- Astrolabium planum. Augsburg: Erhard Ratdolt, 1488
  - Second edition. Venice: Johann Emerich for Lucantonio Giunti, 1494
  - Reprinted. Venice: Lucantonio Giunti, 1502
- Abu Ma'shar al-Balkhi, De magnis coniunctionibus. Augsburg: Erhard Ratdolt, 1489
- Almanach auf das Jahr 1490. Augsburg: Erhard Ratdolt, [1489]
- Regiomontanus, Tabule directionum profectionumque. [Augsburg: Erhard Ratdolt], 1490
- Guido Bonatti (Guido Bonatus de Forliuio), Decem continens tractatus astronomie. Augsburg: Erhard Ratdolt, 1491
- Almanach novum atque correctum per Joannem angelum artium et medicine doctorem peritissimum ex p[ro]prijs tabulis calculatum super Anno domini 1510. Vienna: Johannes Winterburger, 1509
- Almanach novum atque correctum per Joannem angelum artium et medicine doctorem peritissimum ex p[ro]prijs tabulis calculatum super Anno domini 1512. Vienna: [s.n.], 1511
- Astrolabij quo primi mobilis motus deprehenduntur canones. Venice: Peter Liechtenstein, 1512
- Tractat von der Pestilentz Joanni Engel, der freyen künsten und artzney Doctor, auss der leer der Doctorn der artzney und der Astronomey gezogen, Augsburg: Sigmund Grimm and Marx Wirsung, 4 November 1518
