= San Giorgio dei Genovesi =

San Giorgio dei Genovesi can refer to:

- Church of San Giorgio dei Genovesi, Naples
- Church of San Giorgio dei Genovesi, Palermo
- Chapel of San Giorgio dei Genovesi, Sciacca
