= San Giovanni a Mare =

San Giovanni a Mare may mean:

- San Giovanni a Mare, Gaeta
- San Giovanni a Mare, Naples
