= San Giorgio dei Genovesi, Naples =

Coordinates: 40.841507°N 14.251835°E

San Giorgio dei Genovesi
- Chiesa di San Giorgio dei Genovesi
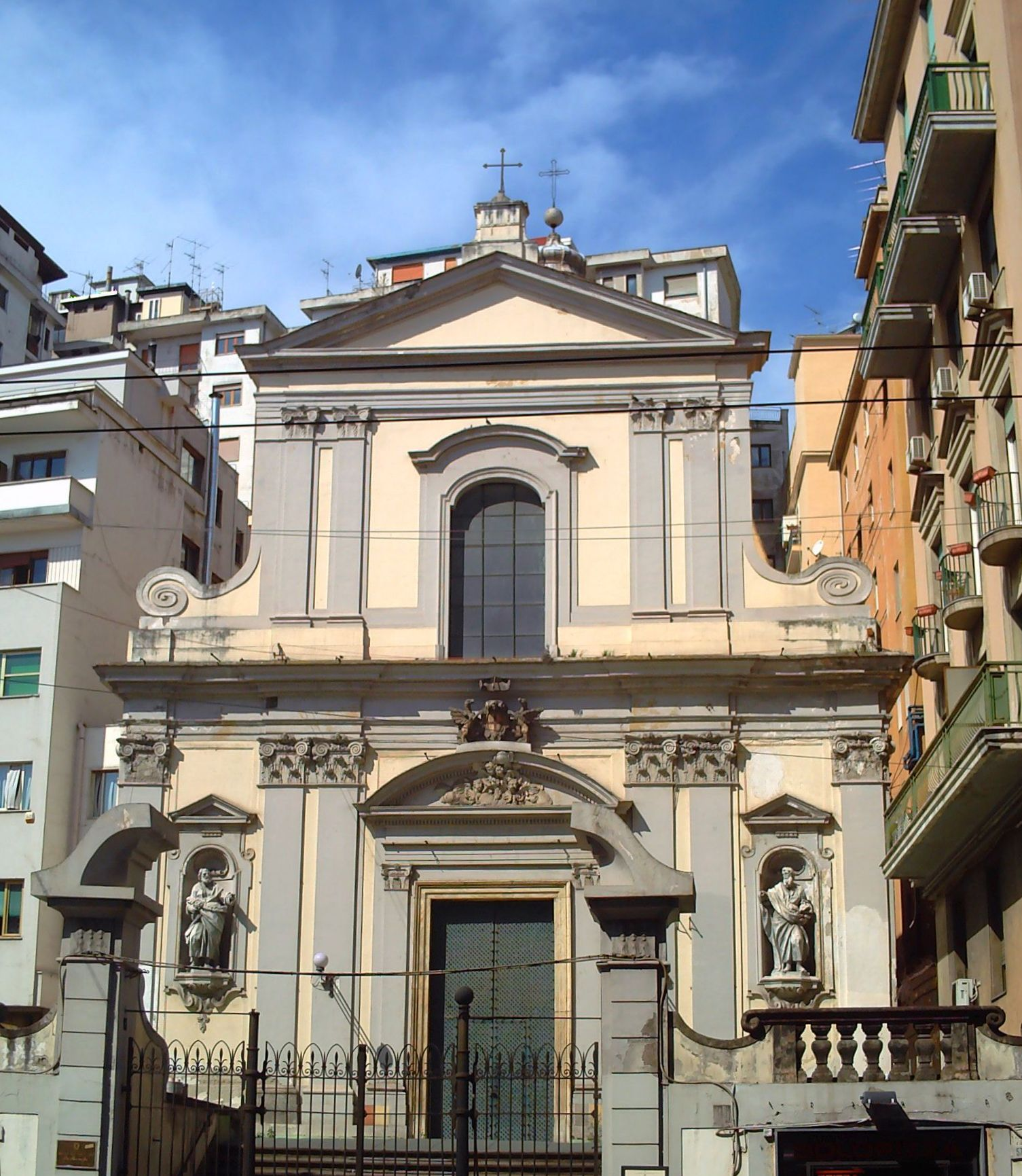
- The façade.
- San Giorgio dei Genovesi
- Location: Naples
- Country: Italy
- Denomination: Roman Catholic

Architecture
- Architectural type: Church

Administration
- Diocese: Roman Catholic Archdiocese of Naples

San Giorgio dei Genovesi (or San Giorgio alla Commedia Vecchia) is a church on Via Medina in the Center of Naples, Italy. It is adjacent and just north of the Church of the Santa Maria Incoronata, two doors south from the Palazzo d’Aquino di Caramanico, and across the street from the Church of the Pietà dei Turchini.

The church was designed in the early 17th century based on designs by Bartolomeo Picchiatti. The original name derives from its attachment to the Genoese community in Naples.

The interior is a Latin Cross plan with abundant stucco decoration and a cupola. The interior has a Caravaggesque painting of St Anthony resurrects a dead man by Battistello Caracciolo. The third chapel on right has frescoes (1770) by Giacomo Cestaro and a painting depicting St George slays the Dragon by Andrea da Salerno. The altar has a marble relief of Sant'Agostino of the 17th century Tuscan school. The facade of the church is simple. The alternate name indicates the church was built at the site of the Neapolitan Commedia dell'arte Theater of the Commedia Vecchia.

== Bibliography ==
- Napoli sacra. Guida alle chiese della città, coordinamento scientifico di Nicola Spinosa; curated by Gemma Cautela, Leonardo Di Mauro, Renato Ruotolo, Naples, Italy 1993–1997, 15 fascicoli.
