= Luca Trevisan =

Italian computer scientist (1971–2024)

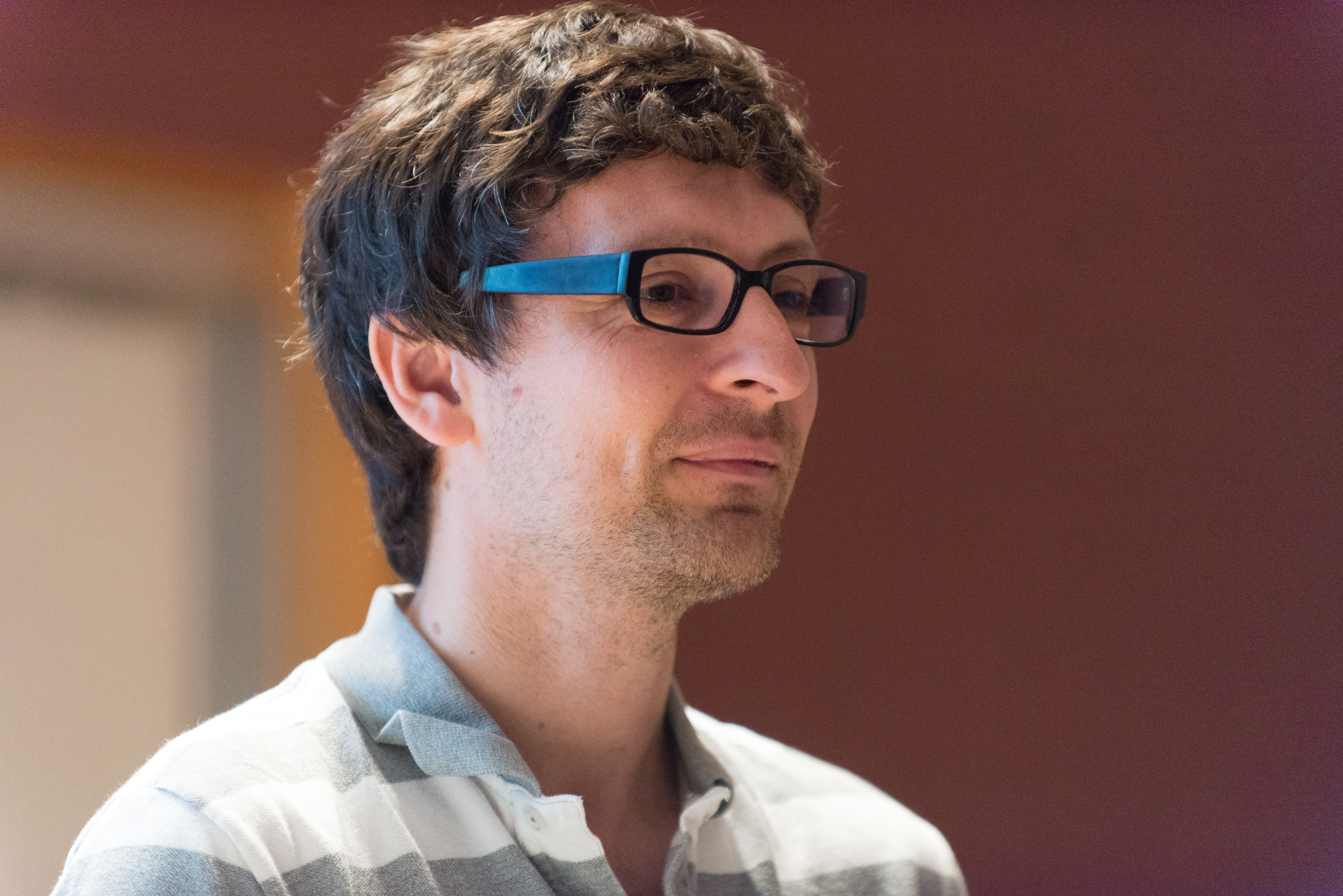
- Trevisan speaking in 2013
- Born: 21 July 1971; Rome, Italy
- Died: 19 June 2024 (aged 52); Milan, Italy
- Education: La Sapienza
- Scientific career
- Fields: Computer science
- Workplaces: University of California, Berkeley
- Doctoral advisor: Pierluigi Crescenzi

Luca Trevisan (21 July 1971 – 19 June 2024) was an Italian professor of computer science at Bocconi University in Milan.

His research area was theoretical computer science, focusing on randomness, cryptography, probabilistically checkable proofs, approximation, property testing, spectral graph theory, and sublinear algorithms. He also ran a blog, in theory, about theoretical computer science.

== Education and career ==
Trevisan received his PhD from La Sapienza, Rome, under the supervision of Pierluigi Crescenzi. After postdoctoral studies at the Massachusetts Institute of Technology and DIMACS, he held an assistant professor position at Columbia University before moving to the University of California, Berkeley and then, in 2010, to Stanford. In 2014 he returned to Berkeley, and in 2019 he moved to the Department of Decision Sciences at Bocconi University.

== Recognition ==
Trevisan won the Danny Lewin Best Student Paper Award at the 1997 Symposium on Theory of Computing, the Oberwolfach Prize in 2000, and a Sloan Fellowship also in 2000. He was an invited speaker at the 2006 International Congress of Mathematicians in Madrid. He was an Erdős Lecturer at Hebrew University of Jerusalem in 2012.

== Personal life and death ==
Trevisan came out as gay in 2000, and in 2012 he organised a collection of testimonials by gay theoretical computer scientists on their experiences in the research community.

Trevisan died in Milan after succumbing to cancer on 19 June 2024, at the age of 52.
