= Angelo Carasale =

Italian architect

Angelo Carasale (died 1742) was an Italian architect, active mainly in Naples.

He held the primary responsibility for designing the elaborate furnishings of the Teatro di San Carlo, which was the new opera house in Naples in 1737. Alexandre Dumas recounts the commonly repeated, yet likely apocryphal, tale that the king was so taken by the beauty of the theatre that he personally presented Carasale to the public for applause, remarking that the only thing lacking from the new theater was a private passageway for royalty from the adjacent Royal Palace. The anecdote continues by stating that, a few hours later, at the end of the performance of the opera Achille in Sciro by Domenico Sarro, Carasale approached the king and notified him that the passageway was ready.

Carasale subsequently served as impresario of the San Carlo opera house for the first four years of its existence.

Earlier, Carasale had been the architect given the task of redesigning San Carlo's predecessor, the small San Bartolomeo theatre, in order that it might be converted into a church. He also worked on the interiors of a number of Neapolitan churches. Apparently, Carasale was imprisoned in the fortress of Sant'Elmo on charges of embezzling funds meant for the San Carlo house. Some sources says that he "died in disgrace."
