= Aichach =

- Town
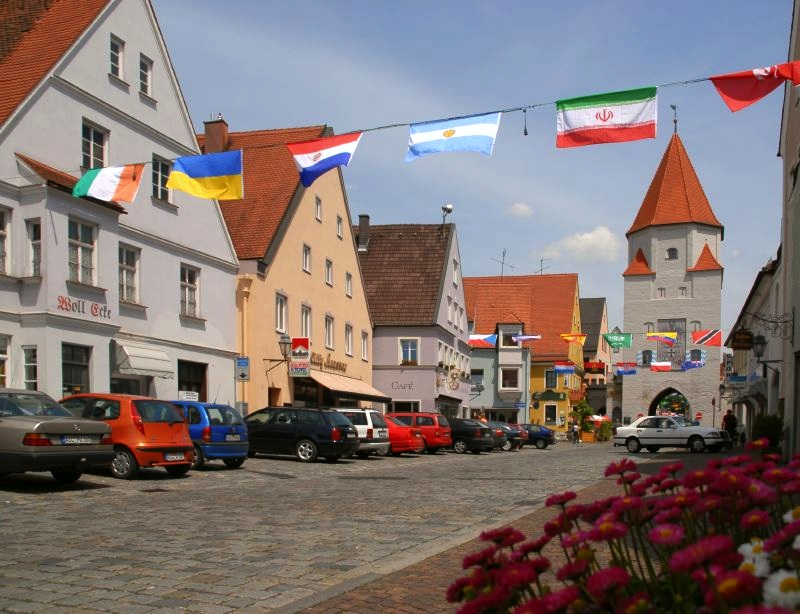
- Town center

- Coat of arms

- Location of Aichach within Aichach-Friedberg district
- Interactive map of Aichach
- Location within Germany Location within Bavaria
- Coordinates: 48°27′N 11°08′E
- Country: Germany
- State: Bavaria
- Admin. region: Schwaben
- District: Aichach-Friedberg

Government
  - Mayor (2020–26): Klaus Habermann (SPD)

Area
  - Total: 92.84 km^{2} (35.85 sq mi)
- Elevation: 435–530 m (1,427–1,739 ft)

Population (2025-12-31)
  - Total: 22,011
  - Density: 237.1/km^{2} (614.0/sq mi)
- Time zone: UTC+01:00 (CET)
  - Summer (DST): UTC+02:00 (CEST)
- Postal codes: 86551
- Dialling codes: 08251
- Vehicle registration: AIC
- Website: www.aichach.de

Aichach (German pronunciation: [ˈaɪçax]; Central Bavarian: Oacha) is a town in Germany, located in the Bundesland of Bavaria and situated just northeast of Augsburg. It is the capital of the district of Aichach-Friedberg. The municipality of Aichach counts some 20,000 inhabitants. It is not far from the motorway that connects Munich and Stuttgart, the A8. The local river is called Paar.

== History ==
Aichach's history dates back nearly 1000 years.

A prison for women was established in Aichach in 1909. In 1967, Ilse Koch, also known as The Witch of Buchenwald, committed suicide here.

== Parish parts ==
There are 40 parts of the municipality:

- Aich (chapel)
- Aichach (main town)
- Aichach (railway station)
- Algertshausen (Kirchdorf)
- Andersbach (wasteland)
- Blumenthal (hamlet)
- Ecknach (Pfarrdorf)
- Edenried (Kirchdorf)
- Eitershofen (wasteland)
- Frogham (Wasteland)
- Gallenbach (parish village)
- Gansbach (wasteland)
- Griesbeckerzell (parish village)
- Hiesling (village)
- courtyard garden (village)
- Ippertshausen (hamlet)
- Blades (parish village)
- Knottenried (wasteland)
- Matzenberg (wasteland)
- Neuhausen (hamlet)
- Neulhof (upper) (hamlet)
- Neulhof (lower) (wasteland)
- Neumuehle (hamlet)
- Nisselsbach (wasteland)
- Oberbernbach (parish village)
- Obermauerbach (parish village)
- Oberschneitbach (Kirchdorf)
- Oberwittelsbach (parish village)
- Röckerszell (wasteland)
- Sulzbach (parish village)
- Potting Mill (Wasteland)
- Untergriesbach (village)
- Untermauerbach (Kirchdorf)
- Untermühle (Wasteland)
- Unterschneitbach (Kirchdorf)
- Unterwittelsbach (village)
- Walchshofen
- Wilpersberg (wasteland)
- Windten (Wasteland)
- Wöresbach (wasteland)

== Mayor ==
Since 1996: Klaus Habermann (born 1953) (SPD)

== Twin towns – sister cities ==
Aichach is twinned with:

- Brixlegg, Austria
- Gödöllő, Hungary
- Schifferstadt, Germany

== Notable people ==
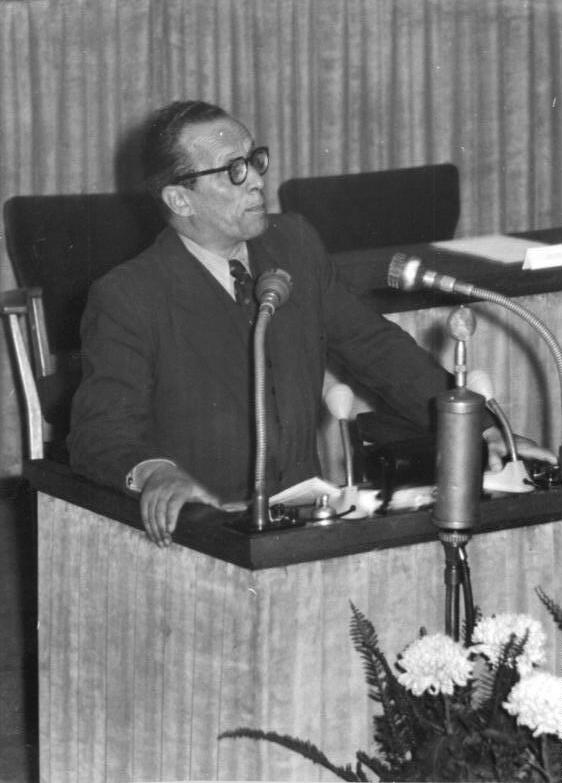
Vinzenz Müller in 1951

- Erhard Bühler (born 1956), major general
- Christoph Burkhard (born 1984), footballer
- Johannes Engel (1453–1512), doctor, astronomer and astrologer
- Matthias Greitter (1495–1550), cantor and composer
- Chrislo Haas (1956–2004), musician
- Vincenz Müller (1894–1961), officer of Reichswehr, Wehrmacht and NVA
