= Matthias Greitter =

Matthias Greitter, also Matthäus Greiter, (ca. 1495 – 20 December 1550) was a German priest, cantor and composer.

== Life ==
Greitter was born in Aichach. He became priest and cantor at Strasbourg Cathedral. In 1524 he joined the new Reformed Church. In 1538 he accepted a position of music teacher at the Collegium Argentinense (later University of Strasbourg). In 1549 he moved back to the Catholic religion and founded a Catholic school of singing, but he died the following year in Strasbourg, presumably from the plague.

== Works ==
=== Sacred works ===
- Domine non secundum, motet, 2 parts, 1545
- Passibus ambiguis/Fortuna desperata, motet, 4 parts
- Christ ist erstanden/Christus surrexit, motet, 5 parts
- 7 psalms
- Kyrie
- Gloria
- Credo
- Alleluia

=== Secular works ===
- 16 songs, 4–5 parts

== Sources ==
- Moritz Fürstenau (1879). "Greitter, Matthäus". Allgemeine Deutsche Biographie (in German). Vol. 9. Leipzig: Duncker & Humblot. p. 636.
- Hans-Christian Müller (1966). "Greiter, Matthäus". Neue Deutsche Biographie (in German). Vol. 7. Berlin: Duncker & Humblot. pp. 41–42. (.html full text online).
- Hans-Christian Mueller and Sarah Davies's article in New Grove Dictionary of Music
