= Santa Maria Incoronata, Naples =

Church building in Naples, Italy

Church of Santa Maria Incoronata
- Chiesa di Santa Maria Incoronata
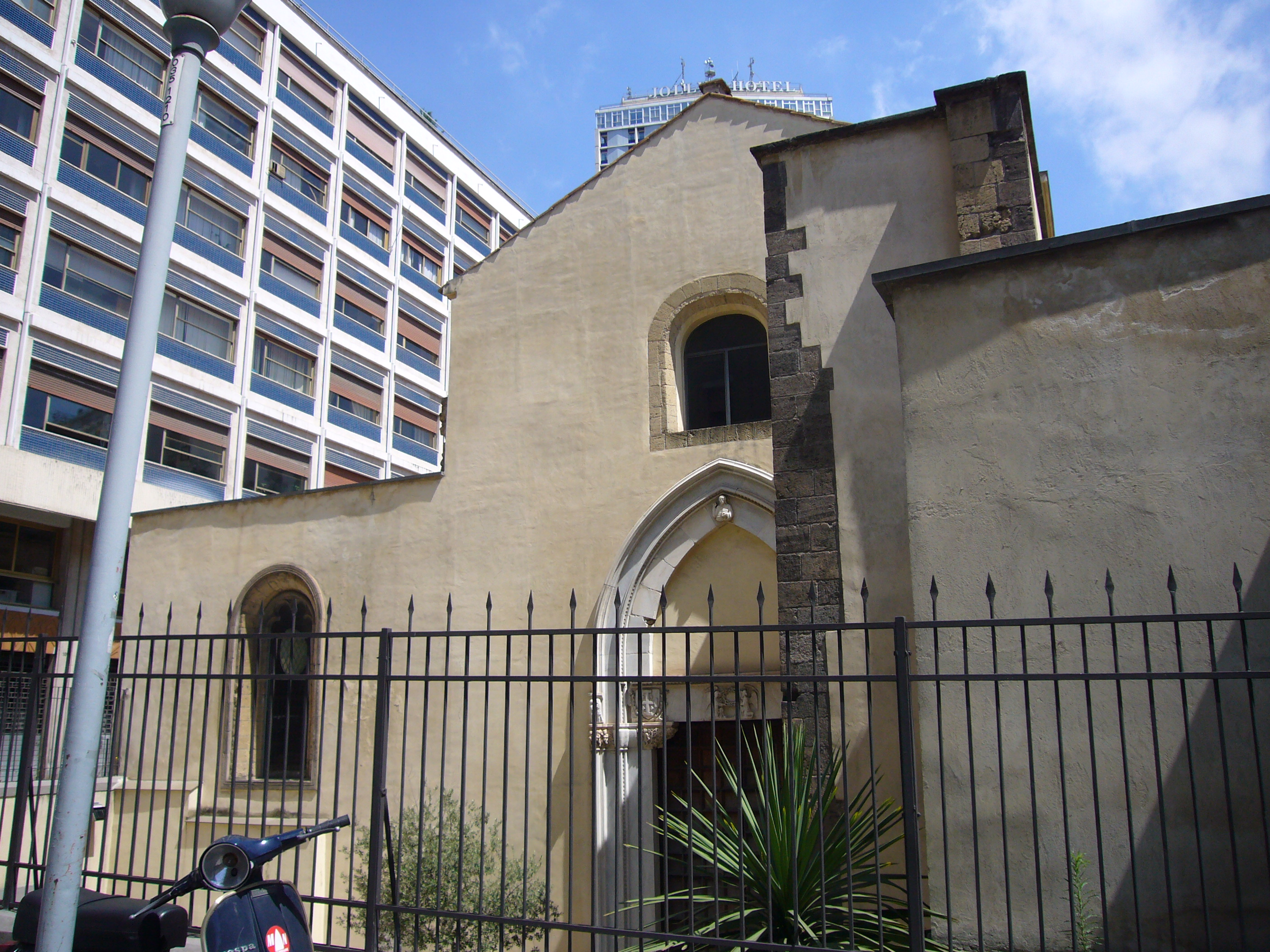
- The façade of Santa Maria Incoronata.
- Church of Santa Maria Incoronata
- 40.841210°N 14.252063°E
- Location: Via Medina; Naples; Province of Naples, Campania
- Country: Italy
- Denomination: Roman Catholic

History
- Status: Active

Architecture
- Architectural type: Church
- Groundbreaking: 1352
- Completed: 1373

Administration
- Diocese: Roman Catholic Archdiocese of Naples

Santa Maria dell'Incoronata is an ancient church on Via Medina in Naples, Italy. It is located just south of San Giorgio dei Genovesi and across the street from the Church of Pietà dei Turchini.

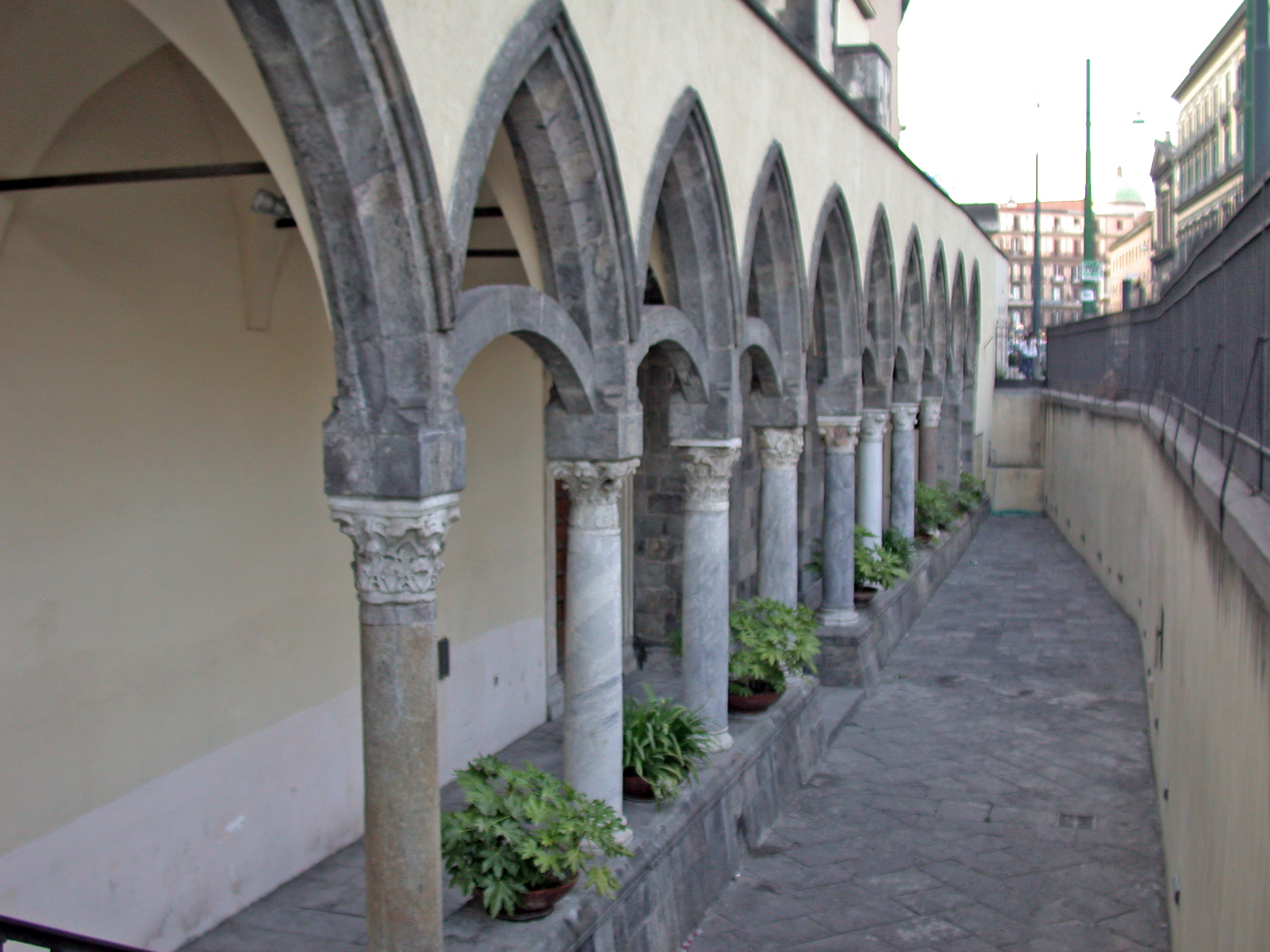
Portico

The church was built in the 14th century in Gotico Angioino style as part of urban project around the Castel Nuovo, the royal palace of Charles II of Anjou. The church was founded in 1364, not as tradition holds, in memory of the coronation of Joanna I of Naples and her second marriage to Louis, Prince of Taranto, but to hold a precious relic, a spine from the thorny crown of Christ, which the queen had requested from Charles V of France, and whose portrait is kept in the entrance. The edification of the Palace chapel or cappella palatina outside of the Castle, was completed in a difficult moment for the Queen, after the death of her husband in 1362.

In 1403 Ladislaus of Naples ordered the painting of a cycle of Saint Ladislaus' legend in the church (finished 1414). There the Hungarian king is depicted receiving the royal crown, also fighting against the pagans, and receiving the crown of Croatia.

Originally a small hospital was constructed attached to the church, and the entire complex was under the jurisdiction of the Carthusian Monastery of San Martino, till the end of the 16th century. The church was reconsecrated in the 18th century, after years of disuse, and restored over the centuries. However the interior has been stripped on most of its former Baroque decoration.

== Interior ==
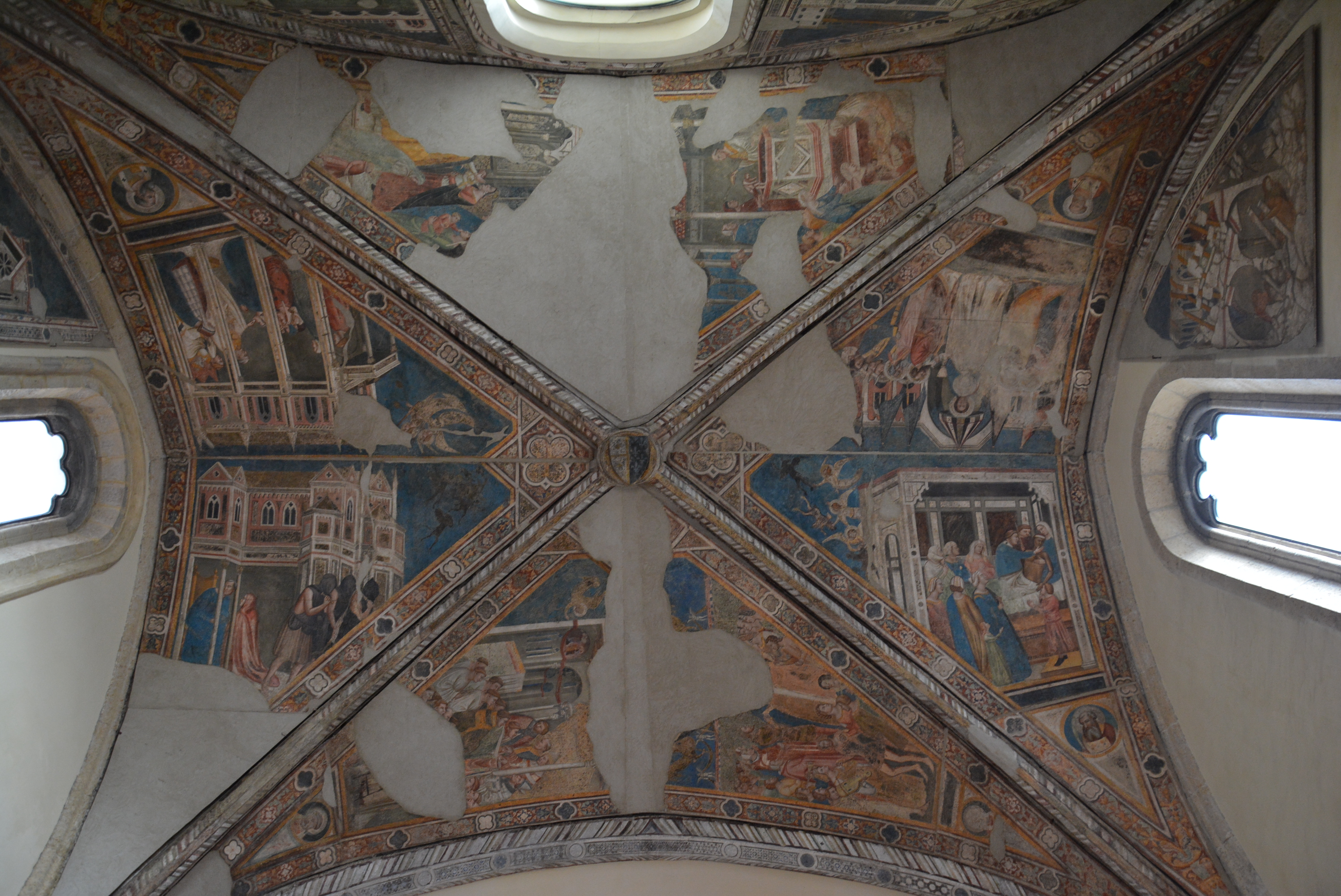
Frescoes on arches

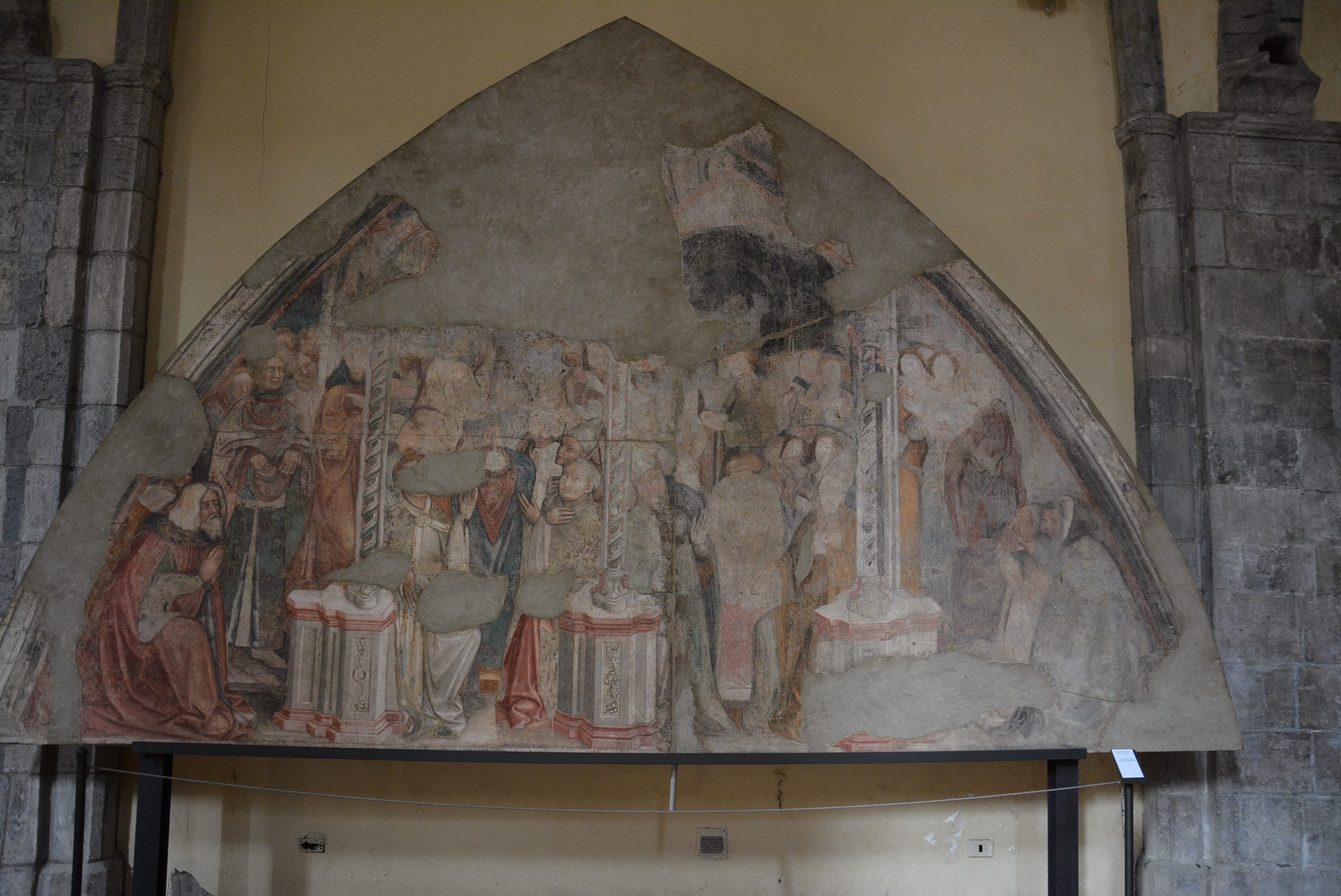
Ladislaus venerates the relic of the crown

The particular shape, consisting of two asymmetric naves, derives from the fact that part of this church was once a tribunal during the Angevin Era. The church floor is lower than the street level, since this area was raised using soil from the nearby earthenworks of the Castel Nuovo in times of Charles V. Fragments of frescoes dating likely from 1352 are visible in the first bay to the left of the entrance, they once depicted the Triumph of Faith and Seven Sacraments, attributed to Roberto d'Oderisio. Some attributions, without any documentation, have been made for some of the images on the frescoes; they remain highly speculative.

In the end of the nave, left of the 17th century main altar is the Chapel of the Crucifix (Cappella del Crocifisso), that had 15th-century frescoes depicting Life of San Ladislao and commissioned by King Ladislaus of Naples in 1403. Fragments are now displayed in the main nave, and attributed to an unknown master. The ceiling of the chapel has frescoes on the subject of Life of the Virgin, and the chapel once had a polyptych, now in the Museum of Capodimonte, both of these were by the same artist.

In the chapel was once a wooden crucifix made by Naccherino, long considered a work of Giovanni da Nola; the crucifix is now found in the Church of Santa Maria di Costantinopoli.

== Bibliography ==
- Celano, Chiarini, Notizie del bello, dell'antico e del curioso, Naples 1972.
- G.A. Galante, Napoli Sacra, Naples 1872.
- F.Navarro, Il maestro di San Ladislao, in "Dialoghi di Storia dell'arte", 7, 1998.
