= Giunti (printers) =

Florentine family of printers

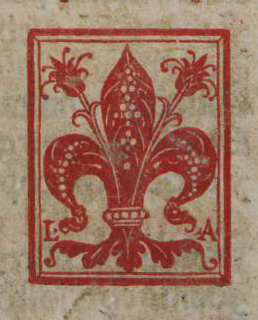
- The Florentine giglio, printer's mark of Lucantonio Giunti, from a missal printed in Venice in 1521
- Earlier spellings: Giunta; di Giunti
- Origin: Republic of Florence
- Members: List: Giunta Giunti; Lapo Giunti; Biagio Giunti; Giunta Giunti (1407–1471); Iacopo Giunti (1426–?); Mariotto Giunti (1445–1499); Biagio Giunti (1446–1509); Filippo Giunti (1456–1517); Lucantonio Giunti (1457–1538); Francesco Giunti (1458–?); Iacopo Giunti (1478–1528?); Giovanni Giunti (d. 1561); Giuntino Giunti (1477–1521); Tommaso Giunti (1494–1538); Giovanmaria Giunti; Bernardo Giunti (1487–1550); Benedetto Giunti (1506–1562); Giovanni Giunti; Benedetto Giunti; Giacomo Giunti (1487–1546); Filippo Giunti (1533–1600); Iacopo Giunti (d.1591); Bernardo Giunti (d.1597); Luca Giunti; Giulio Giunti; Lucantonio Giunti (d.1602); Jeanne Giunti; Jacqueline Giunti (1547–?); Modesto Giunti; Giandonato Giunti; Cosimo Giunti (1579–?)

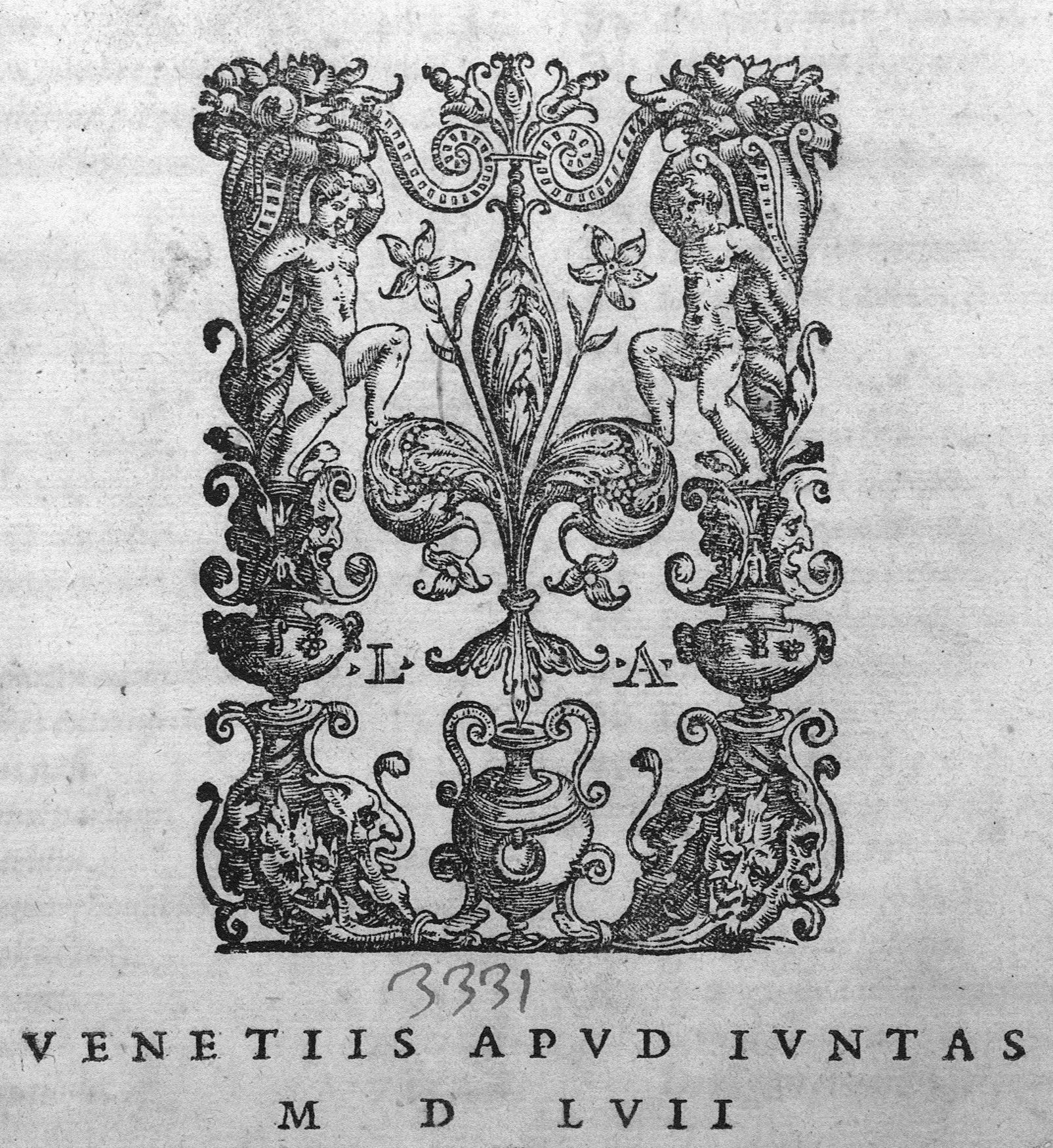
Giunti printer's mark on the frontispiece of the Practica Ioannis Arculani Veronensis … of Giovanni Arcolano, Venice 1557

The Giunti, sometimes given as Giunta, were a Florentine family of printers. (Note: The surname is also found as Giunta, de Gionta, de Giunta, de Giuntis, Degionta, Deionta, Dezunta, di Giunta, Iunta, Juncta, Junta, Junte, de Zonta, de Zontis or de Zunta, Juncta, and de' Giunti Modesti.) The first Giunti publishing bookshop was established in Venice by Lucantonio Giunti, who began printing under his own name in 1499 or 1500. The press of his brother Filippo Giunti (1450–1517) in Florence, active from 1497, was a leading printing firm in that city from the turn of the sixteenth century. Some thirty members of the family became printers or booksellers. A press was established in Lyon in 1520. By about 1550 there were Giunti bookshops or warehouses in Antwerp, Burgos, Frankfurt, Lisbon, Medina del Campo, Paris, Salamanca and Zaragoza, and agencies in numerous cities of the Italian peninsula, including Bologna, Brescia, Genoa, Livorno, Lucca, Naples, Piacenza, Pisa, Siena and Turin, as well as the islands of Sardinia and Sicily.

In Venice the Giunti press was the most active publisher and exporter of liturgical texts in Catholic Europe.

In Florence the Giunti sought an effective monopoly of music-printing. Prominent in the output of the press are bandi and laws promulgated by the Grand Dukes of Tuscany, for whom the Giunti operated virtually as an official press.

The classic bibliographic monograph, De Florentina luntarum typographia by Angelo Maria Bandini, details the output of the press at Florence by year from 1497 to 1550. Bandini was able to build upon a printed catalogue of 1604.

After the death of Bernardo in 1551, the presses continued to be operated by their heirs. The most famous book published by the Giunti is the second edition of the Lives of the Most Excellent Painters, Sculptors, and Architects by Giorgio Vasari in 1568.

== Origins ==
The origins of the family are unknown. The first documentary record, from 1427, finds the three brothers Luca, Giunta and Iacopo in the parish of Santa Lucia d'Ognissanti, where they lived with their mother; their father Biagio had died. Luca was ill, Giunta was a weaver, and Iacopo a labourer. In 1451 Giunta's seven sons were living together within the walls of Florence; among them were Lucantonio and Filippo, founders of the family printing business.

== Lucantonio Giunti ==
Lucantonio Giunti (1457 – 1538) was one of the seven sons of Giunta di Biagio. With his brother Bernardo, he left Florence in about 1477 for Venice, where he set up as a stationer. In 1489 he started book publishing with three titles printed by Matteo Capcasa. From 1491 Giunti was constantly active as a publisher, and later as a printer too; he issued some 410 titles during his lifetime. He did not have his own printing workshop until about 1500; until that time, he employed independent typographers, most frequently Johan Emerich of Speier.

== See also ==
- Books in Italy
