= Matteo Capcasa =

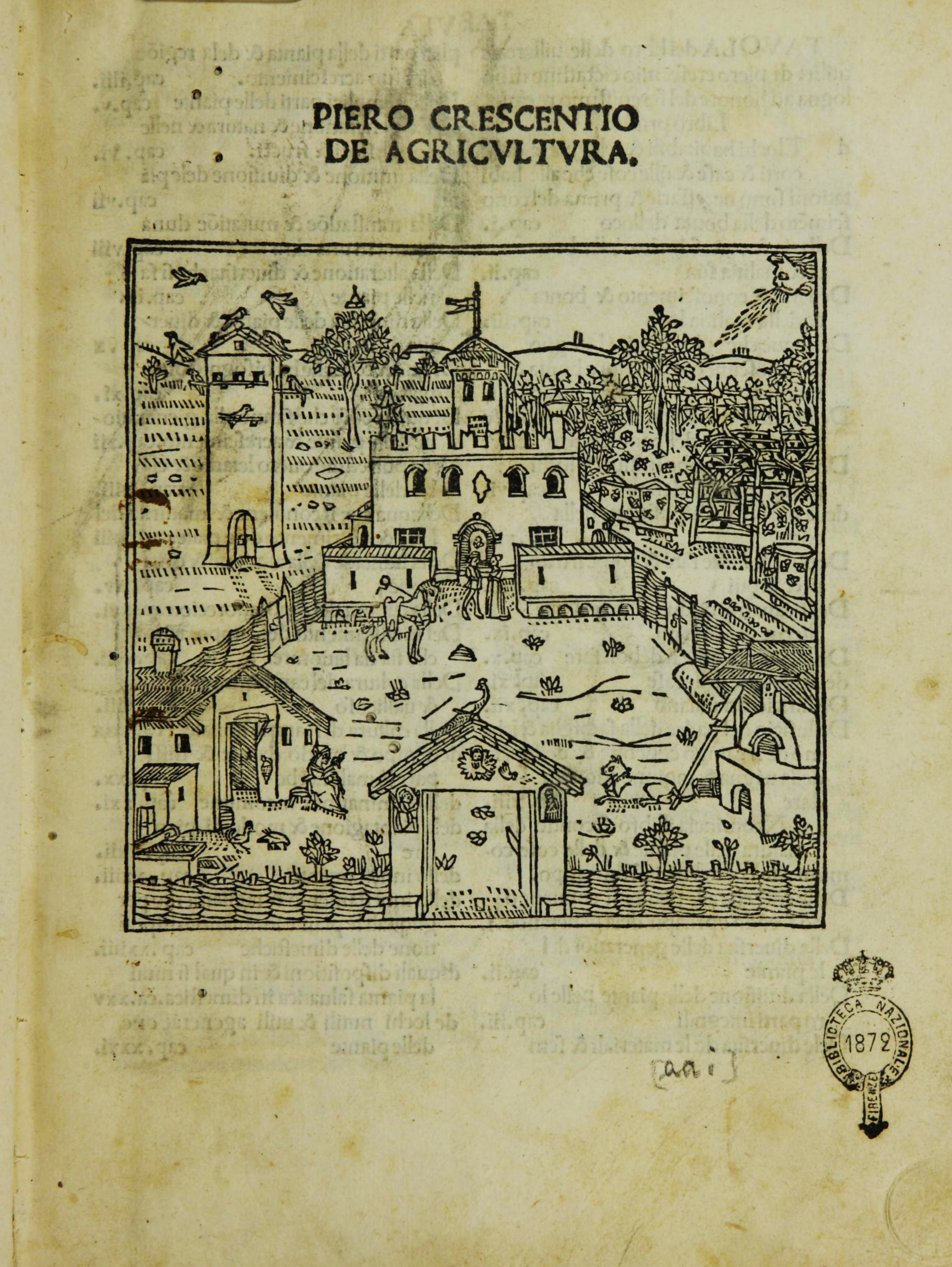
- Title page of a vernacular translation of the De agricultura of Piero Crescentio, printed by Capcasa in Venice in 1495
- Born: Parma
- Died: 1495; Venice
- Other names: Matteo Capodicasa; Matteo Cap di Casa; Matteo Codeca; Matteo Chodeca; Matteo Co de Cha; Mattheo da Parma
- Occupations: printer, typographer

Matteo Capcasa was a printer and typographer from Parma, in Emilia in central Italy, which at that time was subject to the Duchy of Milan. He was active as a book printer and typographer in Venice from 1485, when he printed a Vocabularium utriusque iuris (usually attributed to Jodocus of Erfurt) and an anonymous Fior di virtù. His workshop was in San Paterniano in the sestiere of San Marco, where he worked with his brother Giovanni.

In 1489 Capcasa began a collaboration with the Florentine publisher – and later also printer – Lucantonio Giunti, with three titles: the works of Ovid; an anonymous translation into the volgare of the Transito de sancto Hieronymo, partly by Eusebius Cremonensis; and a translation of the Imitatio Christi, authorship of which was at that time attributed to Jean Gerson.

Capcasa then collaborated with Bernardino Benagli on a number of illustrated works, including a finely-illustrated Divina Commedia of Dante on 3 March 1491, with the new text and commentary of Cristoforo Landino; this Capcasa re-printed on his own account in 1493. Later in 1491 Capcasa fell seriously ill. After his recovery, he again collaborated with Giunti, on a further four works including the Dialogo della divina Provvidenza of Catherine of Siena. He also printed a number of books on his own account, including a reprint of the Dante from 1491, another Fior di virtù, the Tragedies of Seneca and the Epigrammata of Giovanni Battista Cantalicio.

In 1494 he printed two editions for the Florentine publisher Girolamo Biondo: the De coelesti vita of Giovanni da Ferrara, and the letters of Marsilio Ficino. In July 1495 he completed printing the Epistolae of Francesco Filelfo for the Milanese publisher Ottaviano Scotti. He died shortly thereafter.
