= San Giacomo degli Italiani =

Church in Naples, Italy

Coordinates: 40.842240°N 14.254525°E

San Giacomo degli Italiani (once the church of San Giacomo dei Pisani) is a church located on Via Depretis in Naples, Italy.

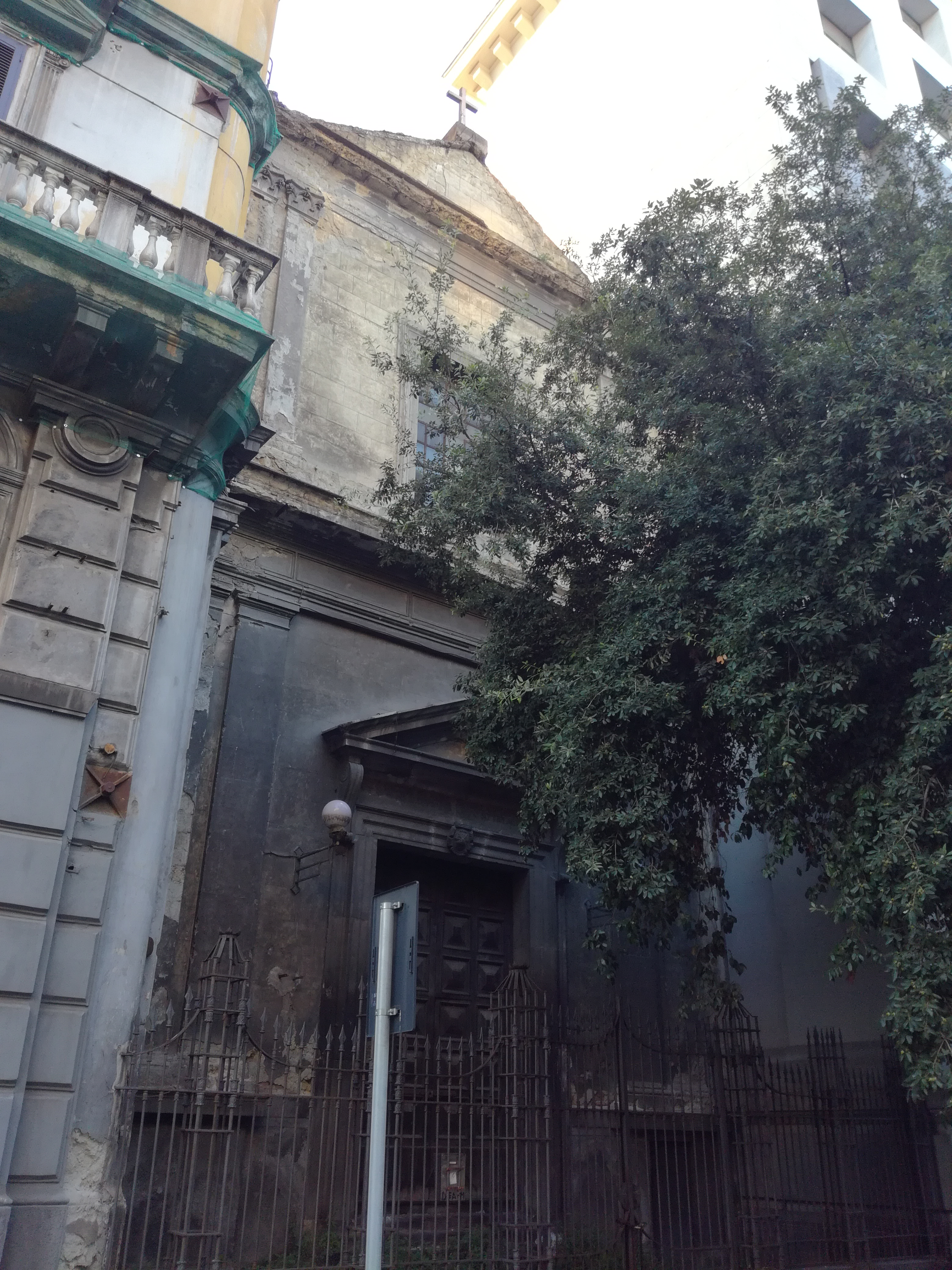
Facade

First built in 1238, in the Swabian era, and given in gratitude to merchants from the Republic of Pisa, who had recently been victorious in a battle against a Saracen navy. At the beginning of the 15th century the church was turned over to the knights of the Order of the Sword (Ordine della Spada). Subsequently circa 1575, the church and the order of the Spada was forbidden to carry out their investitures by the viceroy Íñigo López de Hurtado de Mendoza, and the ceremonies were moved to the San Giacomo degli Spagnoli.

In 1775, the church was granted to the Complementari, who restored the church in a Baroque style. The present church of San Giacomo was reconstructed by reopening an alternative older portal, surmounted by a coat of arms of a shell with crossed swords. Due to the damage from the bombardment of 1943 and the Irpinia earthquake of 1980, the building is not longer consecrated, and used for temporary art exhibitions. The interior artwork has been moved elsewhere.

== See also ==
- Santa Barbara dei Cannonieri, Naples
