= Lucantonio Giunti =

Publisher

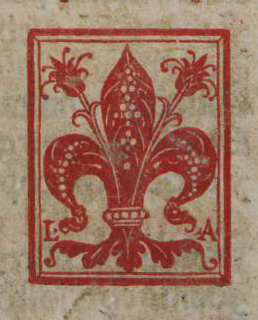
- The Florentine giglio, printer's mark of Lucantonio Giunti, from a missal printed in Venice in 1521
- Born: 1457; Florence
- Died: 3 April 1538 (aged 80–81); Venice
- Resting place: Santa Maria Novella, Florence
- Other names: List: Luceantonius de Gionta; Luceantonius De Giunta; Lucas Antonius de Giuntis; Lucantonio Degionta; Lucantonio Deionta; Lucantonio Dezunta; Lucantonio Fiorentino; Lucantonius Florentinus; Lucas Antonius Florentinus; Luc Antoine Giunta; Lucantonio Giunta; Lucas Antonius Giunta; Luca-Antonio Giunta; Luca-Antonio Giunti; Luc'Antonio Giunti; Lucaantonius Iunta; Lucæantonius Iunta; Lucaantonius Junta; Luce Antonius Junta; Luceantonius Junte; Lucantonio de Zonta; Lucas Antonius de Zontis; Lucantonio de Zunta

Lucantonio Giunti or Giunta (1457 – 3 April 1538) was a Florentine book publisher and printer, active in Venice from 1489, a member of the Giunti family of printers. His publishing business was successful, and among the most important in the late fifteenth and early sixteenth centuries. Through partnerships, often with members of his family, he expanded the business through much of Europe. At about the time of his death in 1538 there were Giunti presses in Florence and Lyon, Giunti bookshops or warehouses in Antwerp, Burgos, Frankfurt, Lisbon, Medina del Campo, Paris, Salamanca and Zaragoza, and agencies in numerous cities of the Italian peninsula, including Bologna, Brescia, Genoa, Livorno, Lucca, Naples, Piacenza, Pisa, Rome, Siena and Turin, as well as the islands of Sardinia and Sicily.

== Life ==
Lucantonio Giunti was one of the seven sons of Giunta di Biagio, a weaver. He was born in the parish of Santa Lucia d'Ognissanti in Florence in 1457. With his brother Bernardo, he left Florence in about 1477 for Venice, where he set up as a stationer. In 1489 he started book publishing with three titles: the works of Ovid; an anonymous translation into the volgare of the Transito de sancto Hieronymo, partly by Eusebius Cremonensis; and a translation of the Imitatio Christi, authorship of which he attributed to Jean Gerson. For all three he employed the printer and typographer Matteo Capcasa. From 1491 Giunti was constantly active as a publisher, and later as a printer too; he issued some 410 titles during his lifetime. He did not have his own printing workshop until about 1500; until that time, he employed independent typographers, most frequently Johan Emerich of Speier.

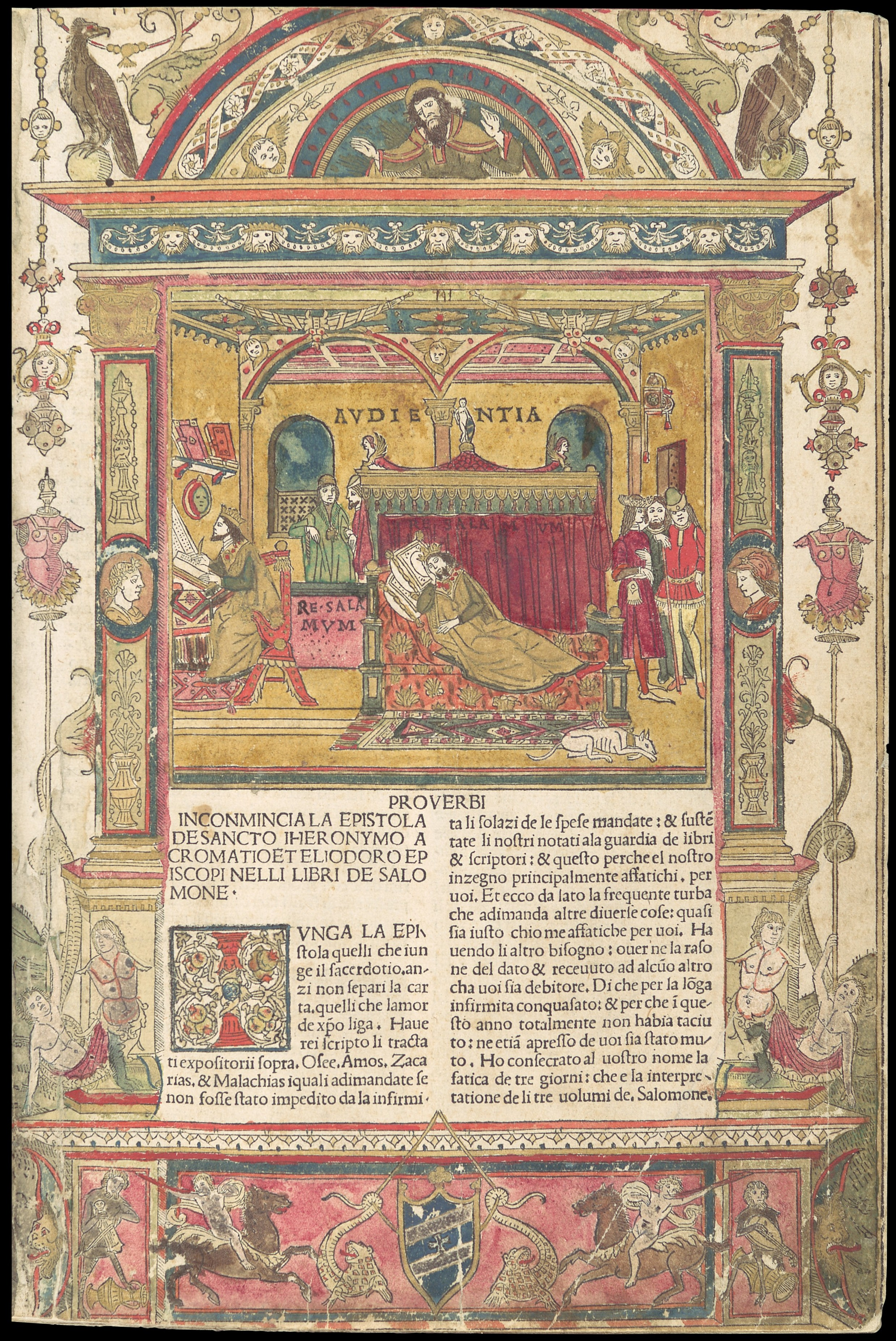
Page from the Malermi Bible in the Metropolitan Museum of Art, printed text, with hand-coloured woodcut illustrations, 1490

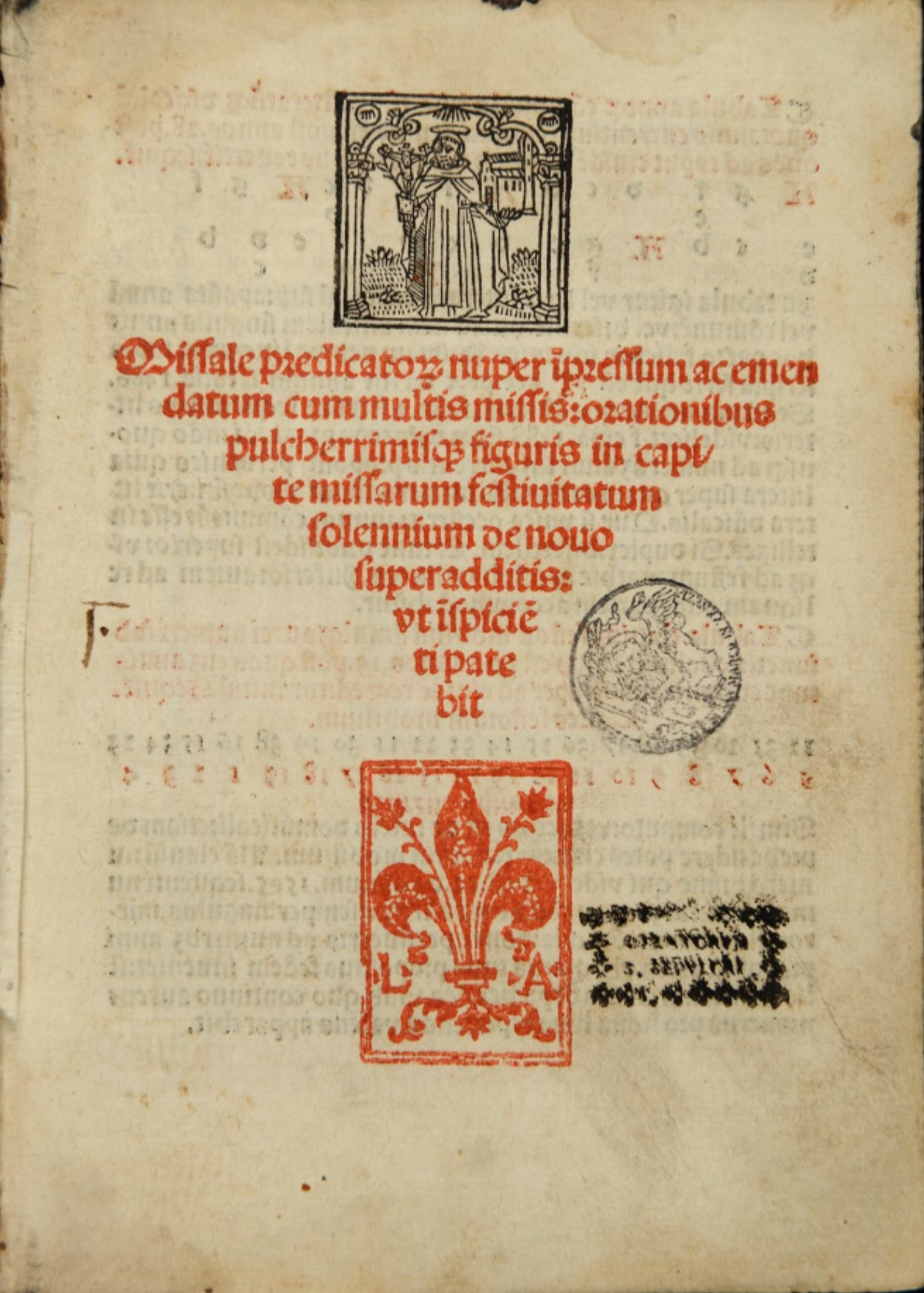
Title-page of the Missale predicatorum, 1504

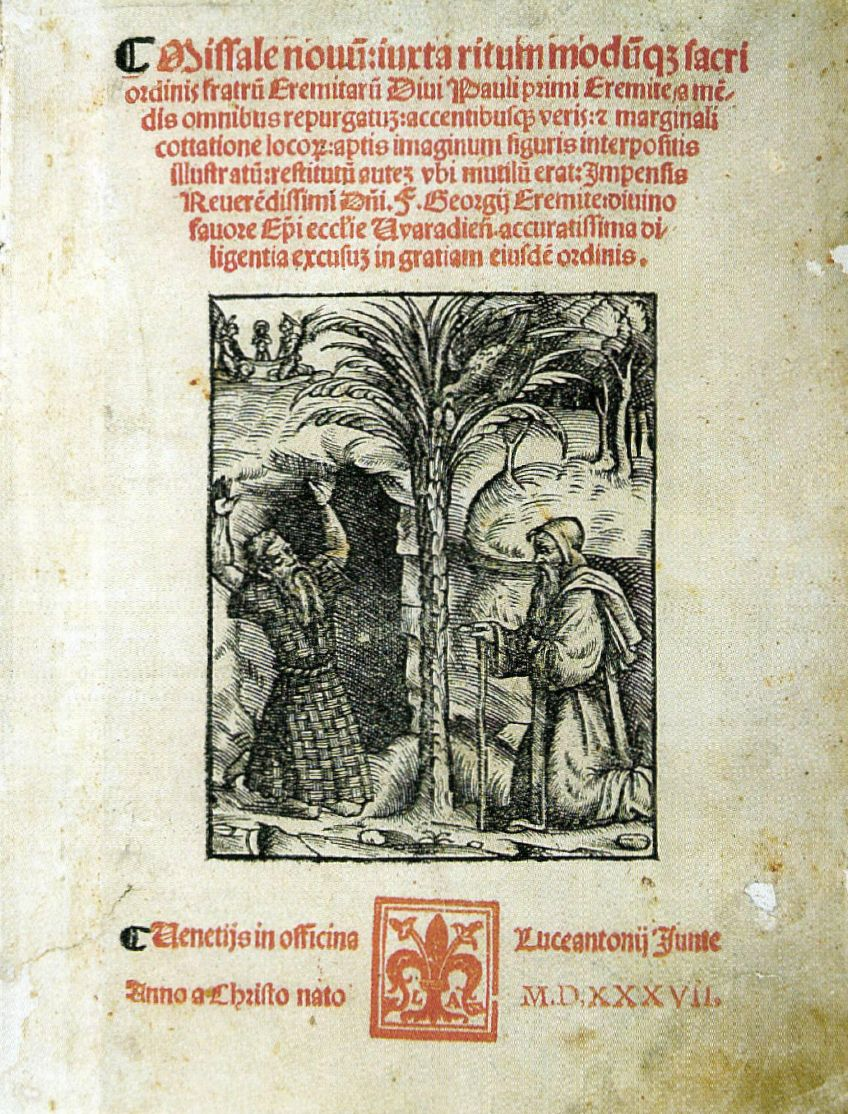
Title-page of a missal, 1537
