= Pierluigi Crescenzi =

Italian computer scientist

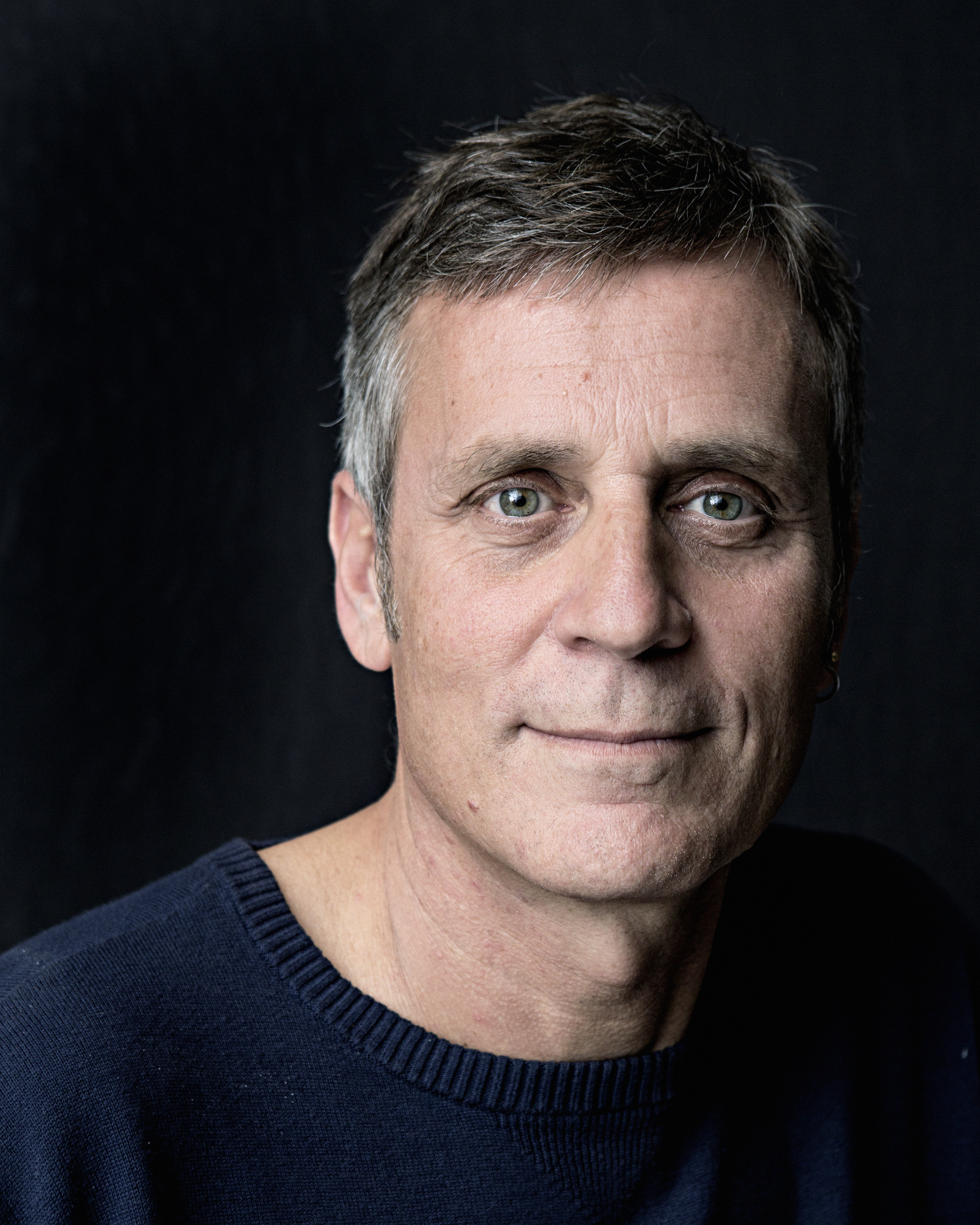
- Born: Rome
- Education: La Sapienza
- Scientific career
- Fields: Computer science
- Workplaces: Gran Sasso Science Institute
- Doctoral advisor: Daniel Pierre Bovet

Pierluigi "Pilu" Crescenzi is a full professor of computer science at the Gran Sasso Science Institute. His research areas include theoretical computer science and computer science education. He has been teaching at Sapienza University of Rome, University of Florence and Université Paris Diderot.

Crescenzi has completed his PhD in Computer Science under the supervision of Daniel Pierre Bovet. He is the co-author of several textbooks in various areas of computer science, including computational complexity, approximation algorithms, and programming. Among his notable students, there is Luca Trevisan.
