= Antonio Crescenzio =

Italian painter

Antonio Crescenzio (active first half of 15th century) was an Italian painter, active in Palermo, Sicily.

He frescoed a large Last Judgement (later destroyed) and De Marzo attributes to him a Triumph of Death, likely the painting The Triumph of Death (Palermo). De Marzo cites works dating from 1417 until 1466, although some of the later works likely belong to Antonello. He was said to be an ancestor of Antonello Crescenzio, who was born early in the 16th century, and practiced both as a sculptor and a painter.
