= Johann Emerich =

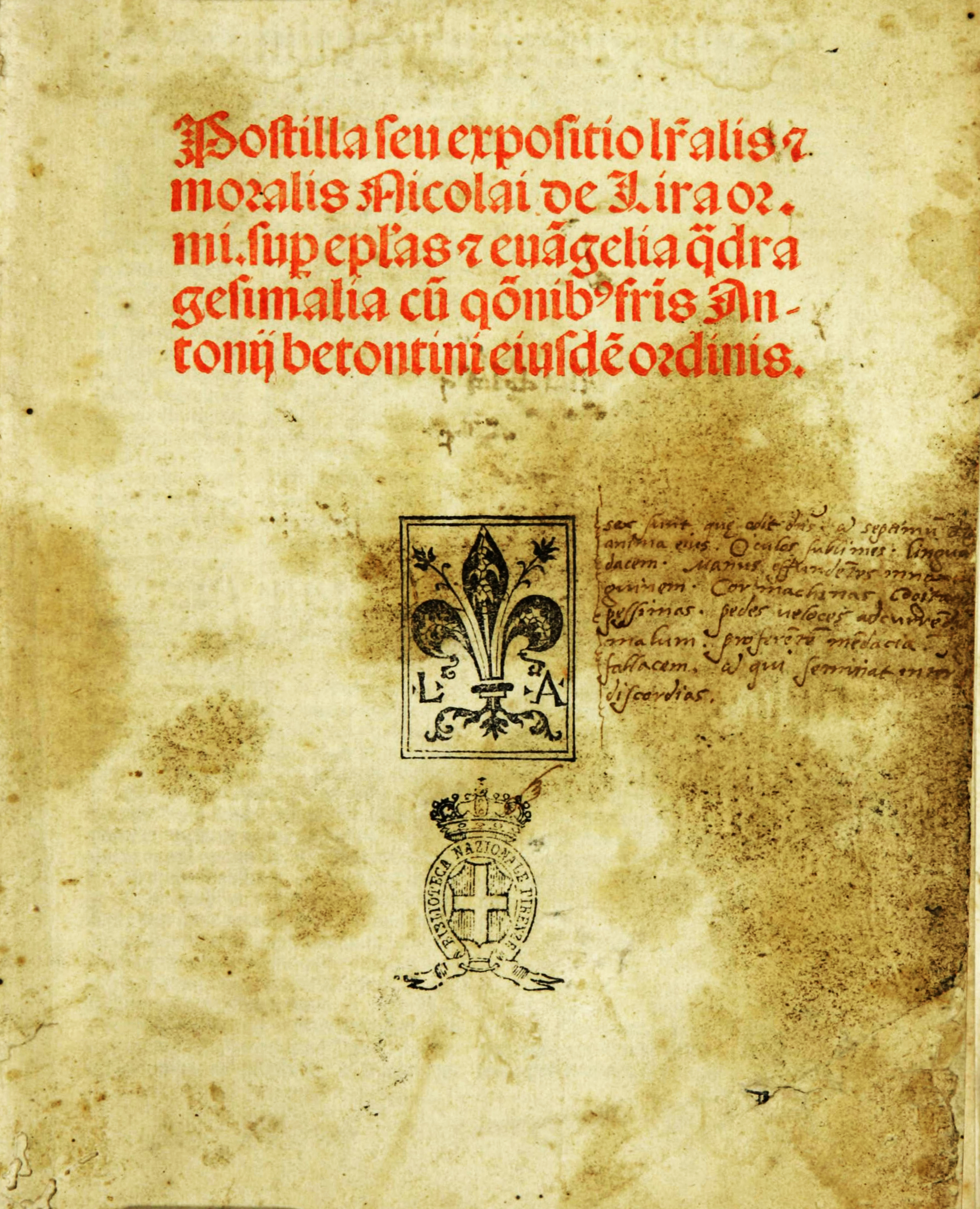
- Title page of the Postilla seu expositio litteralis et moralis of Nicholas of Lyra, printed by Emerich for Lucantonio Giunti, Venice 1494
- Born: Udenheim, near Speyer, Rhineland
- Died: circa 1499; Venice
- Other names: Iohannes Emericus de Spira; Iohannes de Spira
- Occupations: printer, typographer

Johann Emerich was a printer and typographer from Udenheim, near Speyer, in the Rhineland in the Holy Roman Empire. He was active as a book printer and typographer in Venice from 1487, when he collaborated with Johannes Hamman of Landau in the printing of a breviary and a missal, until about 1499, when he spent almost six months on the printing of an illustrated Graduale secundum morem sancte Romane Ecclesie for the Florentine publisher Lucantonio Giunti. Emerich is thought to have died at about this time. His fonts and equipment passed to Giunti and enabled him to establish his own printing workshops.

Emerich printed about forty works, of which about thirty were for Giunti. These represented about half the total output of the Giunti imprint in the fifteenth century. With the single exception of the Astrolabium of Johannes Engel, printed in 1494, all were religious works.
