= Alexander Crescenzi =

Alexander Crescenzi (Hebrew: אלכסנדר קריסצינצי) was a seventeenth-century mathematician, translator, and scholar living in Rome. He was a Jewish convert to Christianity.

Crescenzi became celebrated on account of his report, which he edited with mathematical notes, on the 1660 eruption of Mount Vesuvius. He also translated the Tradado de Chocolate ("Treatise on Chocolate") of Antonio Colmener de Ledesma from Spanish into Italian, published in Rome in 1667 with notes by Alexander Vitrioli.
