= Early theatres in Naples =

Neapolitan drama venues of the 16th and 17th centuries

Theatres for diverse musical and dramatic presentations began to open in Naples, Italy, in the mid-16th century as part of the general Spanish cultural and political expansion into the kingdom of Naples, which had just become a Vicerealm of Spain. None of the early theaters still function as such, having been replaced by later facilities from the mid-18th century onwards. Neapolitan theatres first built in the 16th and 17th centuries include:

== Teatro della Commedia Vecchia ==
Built around 1550, the Commedia Vecchia was the first public theatre in Naples. It was the professional home to acting troupes from Spain "playing the provinces," and it provided a stage for the improvised antics of the masked and costumed figures in the then innovative Italian commedia dell'arte. In its heyday, the theatre was so successful that the government put a tax on their proceeds to finance the Casa dei Incurabili, a home for people with incurable diseases. The theatre was acquired in 1587 by a consortium of merchants and seamen from Genoa. It was torn down in the early 17th century and replaced by the church San Giorgio dei Genovesi, built to serve the considerable Genovese population in Naples at the time. For many years, however, the church was called "San Giorgo alla Commedia Vecchia", thus recalling its origins.

== Teatro dei Fiorentini ==
Built in the first decade of the 17th century, the Teatro dei Fiorentini was meant to replace the defunct Commedia theatre. It took the name from the nearby church of San Giovanni dei Fiorentini. It seated approximately 250 people. In the 18th century the theatre specialised in the opera buffa genre. Antonio Orefice's Patrò Calienno de la Costa which premiered there in 1709 was the first opera buffa in Neapolitan dialect to be performed on a public stage. From 1724, the theatre's main competitor in the opera buffa genre was the much larger Teatro Nuovo. Nevertheless, the Fiorentini survived as a theater into the early 20th century, although it became increasingly a venue for comic plays rather than operas. An establishment calling itself the Fiorentini exists today on the same site but has not functioned as a theatre for many years. It is now a bingo hall.

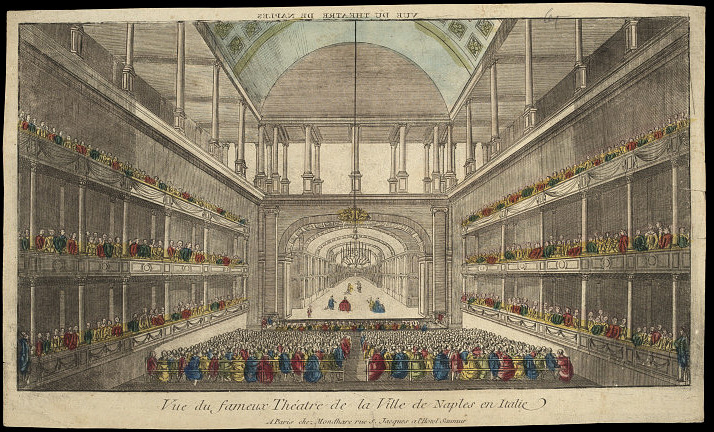
Interior of the Teatro San Bartolomeo

== Teatro San Bartolomeo ==
The Teatro San Bartolomeo was the predecessor of what is now the main opera house of Naples, the Teatro di San Carlo. Built in 1620, the Bartolomeo was originally devoted to prose theatre but by 1650, it was primarily an opera house and the site of the performances of the first real opera in Naples—that is, works by Monteverdi and others from the north, which had begun to filter down to the south. It had been very badly damaged during the insurrection of 1647-48 but was soon rebuilt at great expense. It burnt down in 1681, but was reopened two years later. In 1724 the opera seria Didone abbandonata with the intermezzo L'impresario delle Isole Canarie by Metastasio and the composer Domenico Sarro was performed there. The theatre was closed definitively in 1737 when the newly built Teatro San Carlo replaced it as the royal opera house. It was then largely demolished to build the Chiesa di Santa Maria delle Grazie (also known as "Graziella al Porto Napoli"). However, remnants of the old theatre's boxes are still visible in the church.
