= Antonello Crescenzio =

Italian painter

Antonello Crescenzio, known as Antonello da Palermo, who, according to De Marzo, was the son of Antonio Crescenzio, was born early in the 16th century, and practised both as a sculptor and a painter. He was an assistant to the sculptor Gagnino in 1527. In 1537 he completed two copies of Raphael's 'Spasimo;' one of them is in the Carmelite Church at Palermo, and the other in the Monastery of Fazello, near Sciacca. The date of his death is uncertain.

- Palermo, La Ganzia. Madonna and Child, dated 1528.
