= Crescenzo della Gamba =

Italian painter

Crescenzo della Gamba (active 1749 -1783) was an Italian painter, active in Naples in a late-Baroque style. His style is influenced by Francesco Solimena.

He painted an altarpiece depicting the Exposition of Dead Christ by Angels for the Church of Pietà dei Turchini in Naples. He painted the ceiling of the Teatrino della Corte, depicting Apollo kills the Serpent in the Palace of Caserta. In Caserta, he worked alongside Gaetano Magri. He painted the ceiling of the church of San Pietro in Vincoli in Naples.
