= Crescentius =

Crescentius may refer to:

- The mediaeval writer on agriculture, Petrus de Crescentius, or Pietro de' Crescenzi
- Crescentius of Jesi or Crescentius Grizi of Jesi (died 1263), Italian Franciscan
- Crescentius Richard Duerr, President of De La Salle College in the Philippines

One of several leaders of the Roman aristocracy in the tenth century, during their opposition to the imperial and papal government of the time:

- Crescentius the Elder
- Crescentius the Younger (d. 998 AD)
- John I Crescentius
- John II Crescentius

One of several saints:

- Crescentius of Rome, child saint (feast day: September 14)
- St. Crescentius, bishop of Mainz in the 2nd century AD
- St. Crescentius, deacon of Saint Zenobius
- St. Crescentius, companion of Saint Romulus of Fiesole
- Crescentius, one of a group of four martyrs killed in 326

Crescentius (insect), a genus of true bugs

== See also ==
- Crescentinus
