= San Giovanni a Mare, Naples =

Church in Naples, Italy

Coordinates: 40.846525°N 14.263270°E

San Giovanni a Mare (Italian: [san dʒoˈvanni a mˈmaːre] St. John at Sea) is a church in Naples, Italy. It is located near the docks, not far from the church of Sant'Eligio Maggiore.

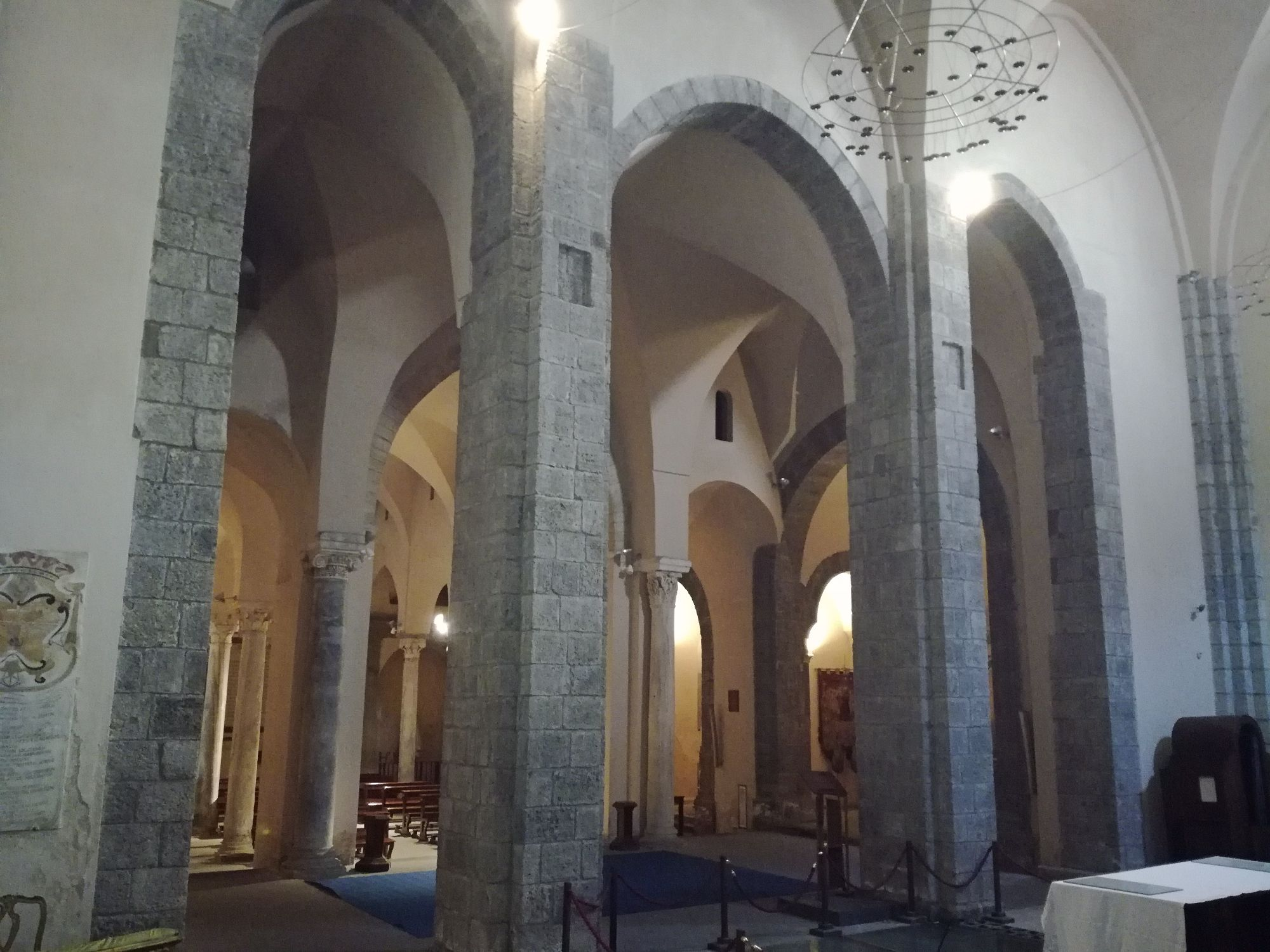
Naves from the presbytery

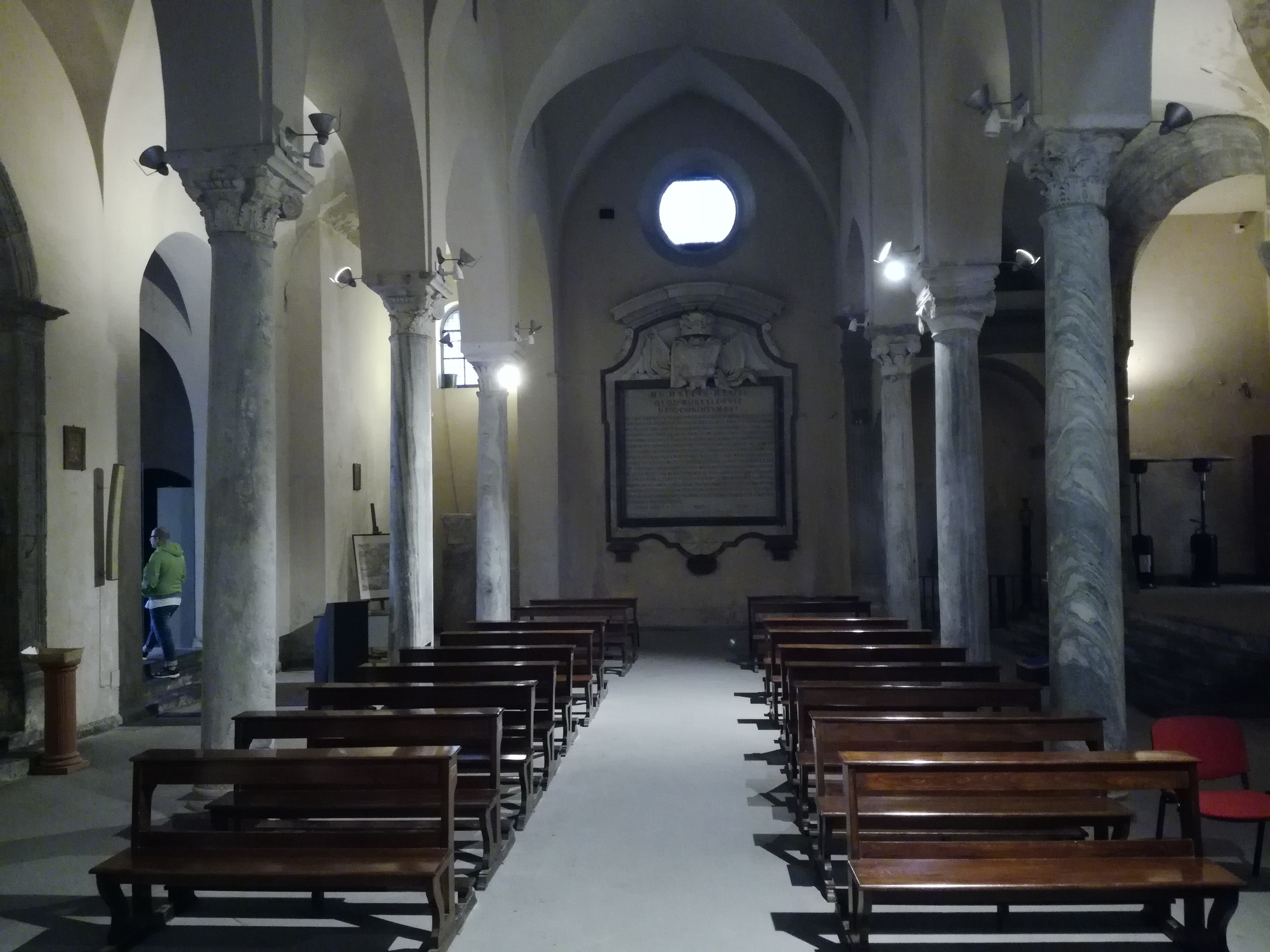
Roman columns

The Romanesque church was erected by Benedictine monks before the 12th century. By the 13th century, the church was attached to a hostel of the knightly order of Gerosolimitani ("Knights Hospitaller"). For some time, the church too belonged to the knights. The hostel was closed by Napoleonic forces, but was returned to the Church in 1828. The church building has been recently restored. Interior columns are spolia. Arabic and Byzantine influences can be seen in some of the apse columns. Other arches in the dome recall architecture of Amalfi.

== Donna Marianna: the Head of Naples ==
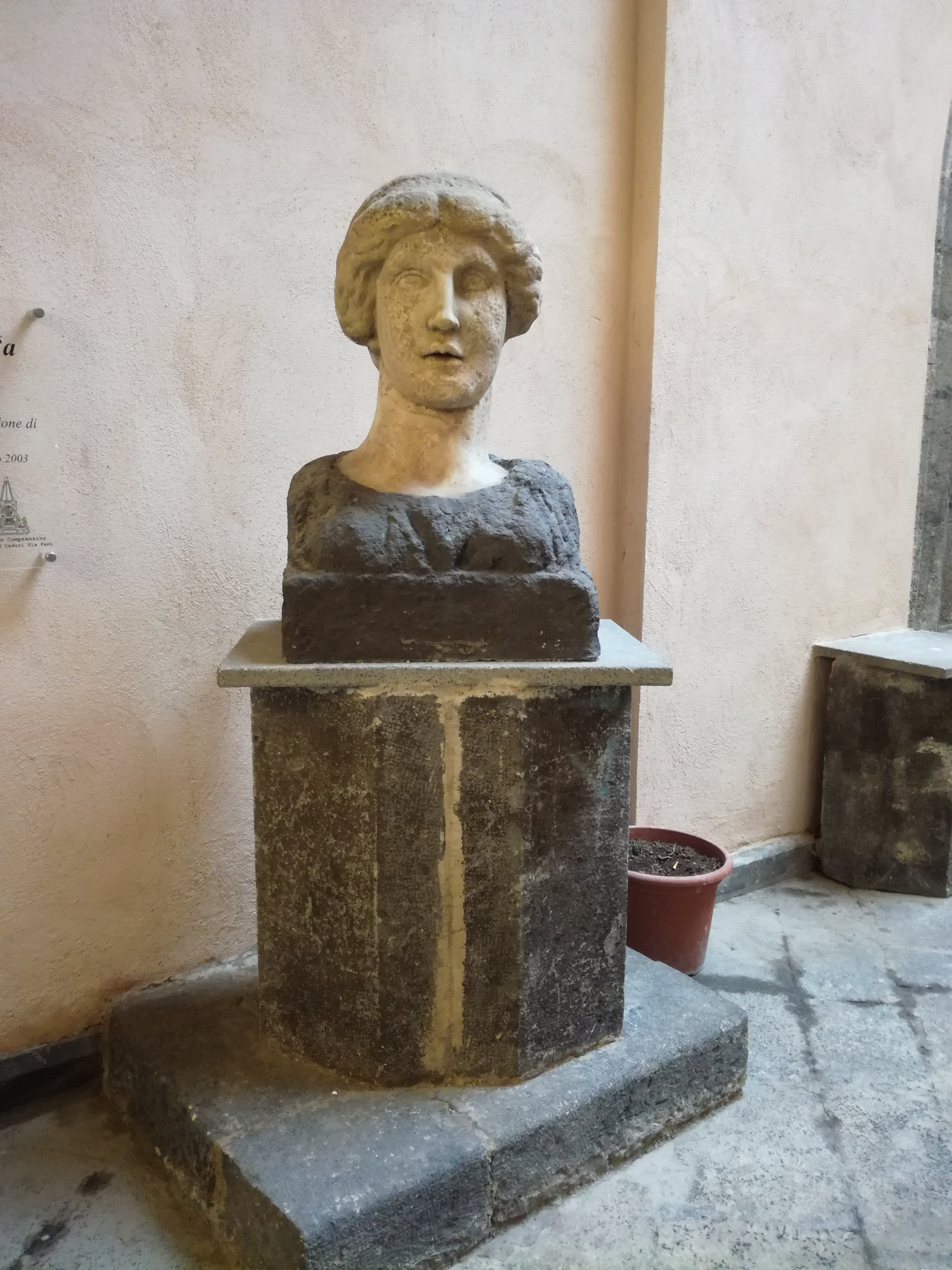
Donna Marianna bust

In the atrium is a copy of an ancient Greek bust; the original is currently in the Palazzo San Giacomo. Now referred to as Donna Marianna or the Head ("Testa") of Naples, it was once found in the Piazza del Mercato ("Plaza of the Marketplace"). The bust was most likely once part of a sculpture depicting the Greek mythological siren Parthenope, associated with the story of Odysseus, and specifically associated with the craggy cliffs and islands in the Bay of Naples. Over time the pagan bust became a symbol of the city, and paradoxically found itself protected inside a church. It was damaged and threatened with destruction during the periods after the Neapolitan Republic of 1647 and of 1799. In the latter period the bust came to be associated with Marianne the symbol of the French Revolution.

== Bibliography ==
- Napoli sacra: guida alle chiese della città, coordinamento scientifico di Nicola Spinosa; a cura di Gemma Cautela, Leonardo Di Mauro, Renato Ruotolo, Naples 1993-1997, 15 fascicoli.
