= Pietà dei Turchini =

Church of Pietà dei Turchini
- Chiesa della Pietà dei Turchini
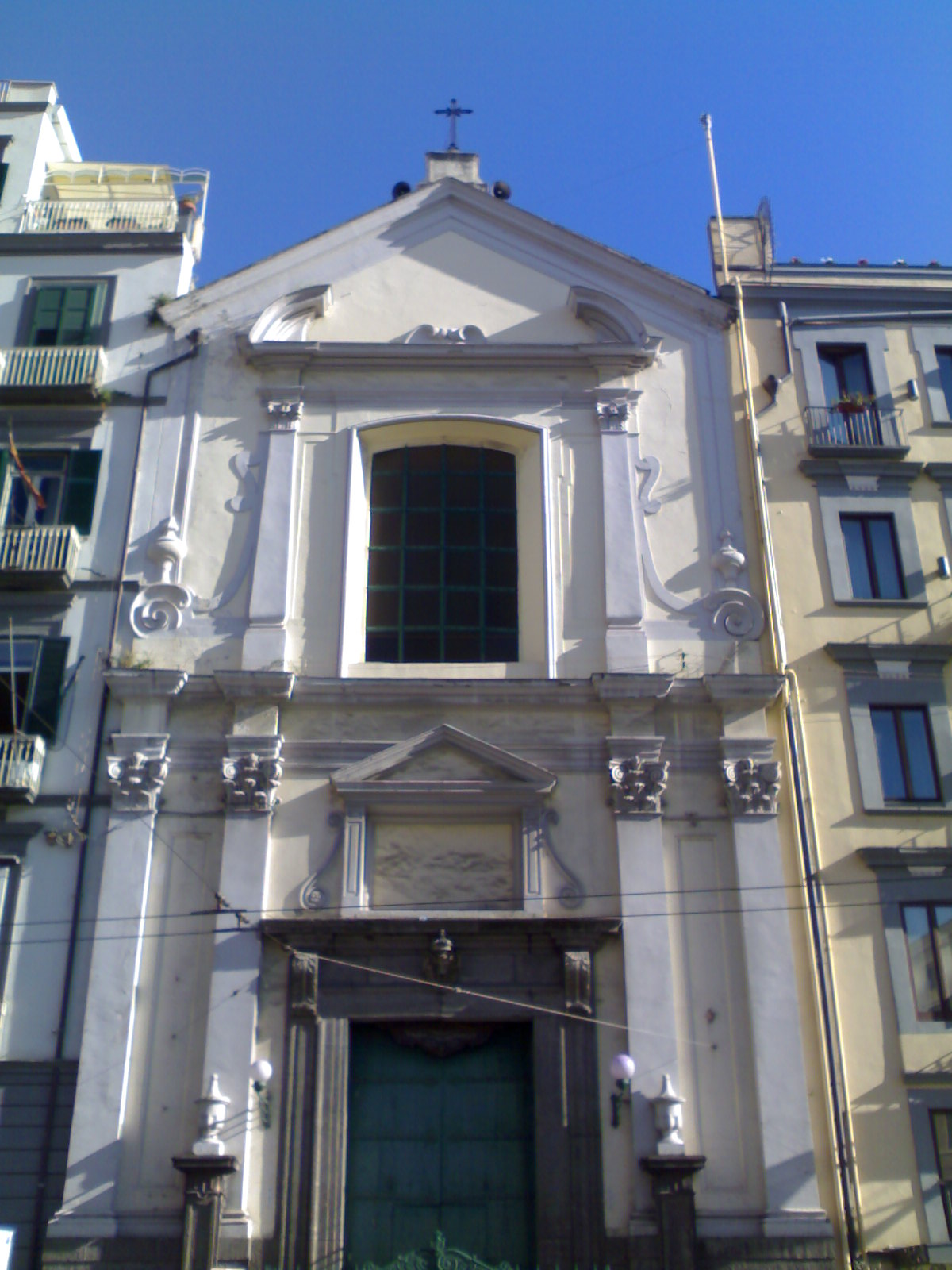
- The façade of church.
- Church of Pietà dei Turchini
- 40.841238°N 14.252637°E
- Location: Naples; Province of Naples, Campania
- Country: Italy
- Denomination: Roman Catholic

History
- Status: Active

Architecture
- Architectural type: Church
- Style: Baroque architecture

Administration
- Diocese: Roman Catholic Archdiocese of Naples

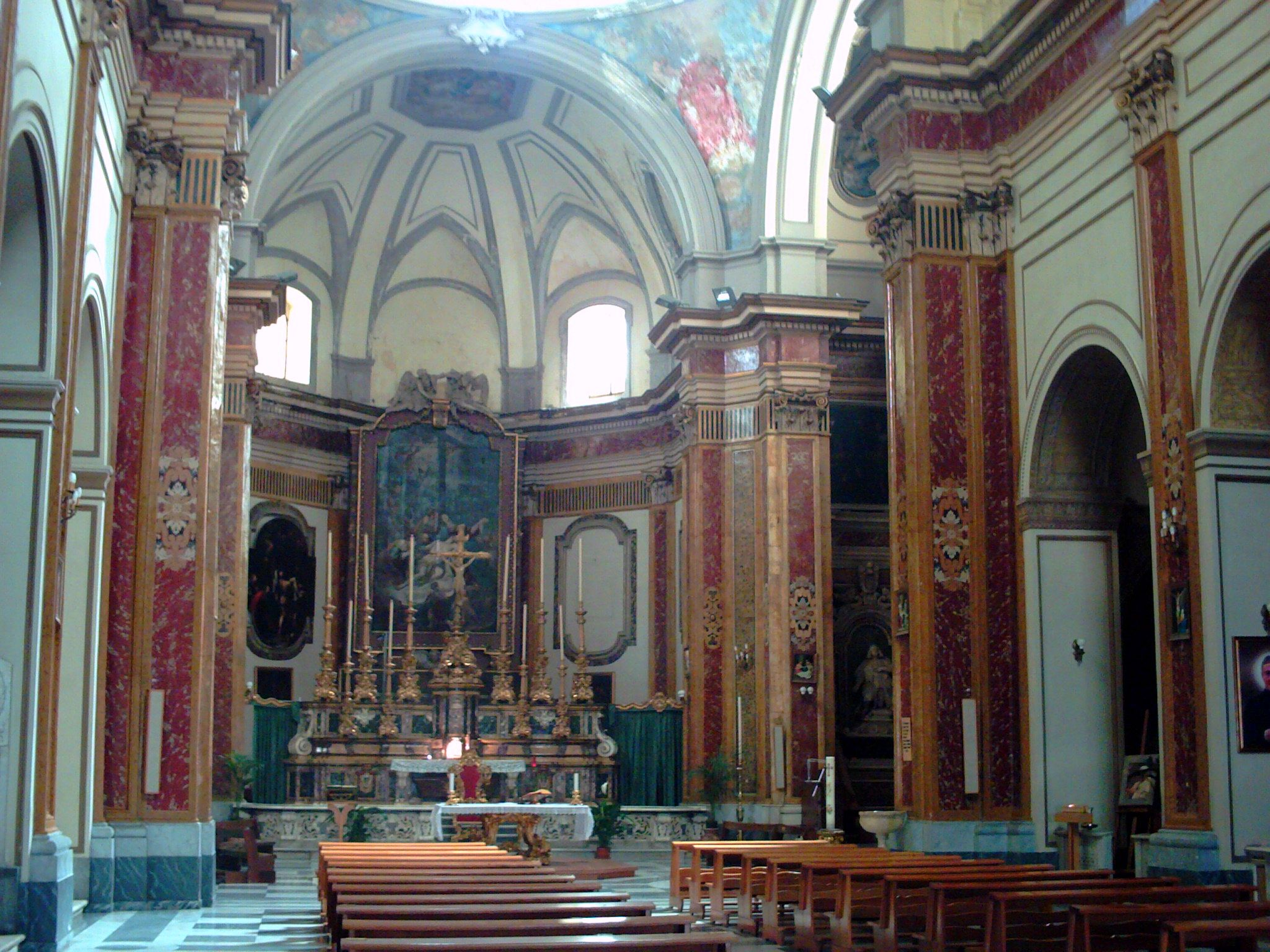
Interior

The Church of Pietà dei Turchini is a religious building in Naples, Italy. A smaller church, located on Rua Catalana, was built originally in 1592–1595 by the Confraternity of the Incoronatella. This church was nearly destroyed by an explosion in the Castel Nuovo in 1638. It was rebuilt in 1638–1639, and retitled Santa Maria Incoronatella della Pietà dei Turchini when it acquired a dome. The facade was completed in 1769–70 by Bartolomeo Vecchione.

== Description ==
The interior hosts two paintings, including the Discovery of the True Cross by St Helena, by Luca Giordano in the third chapel to right, including a Deposition; a Holy Family (1617) by Battistello Caracciolo. The large chapel of the right transept has altarpieces by Giacomo Farelli, depicting the Birth and Death of the Virgin. It houses a Exposition of Dead Christ by Angels by Crescenzo Gamba. The ceiling canvases, painted by Marulli and Annella di Massimo, were removed in the past centuries.

The confraternity, also known as the Congregation of ‘’Bianchi dell'Oratorio’’ referring to the white robes worn by members, was involved in the welfare of orphan children abandoned in the nearby church of Incoronatella in Rua Catalana. In time, needing more space they moved here to via Medina, founding an orphanage, this church, and the annexed conservatory (Conservatorio della Pietà dei Turchini). The name derives from the turquoise tunic worn by the orphans, who were conserved here.

The orphanage instructed the children in art, specially music and singing, and the Conservatory produced or was associated with masters of Italian music. Among its pupils were Scarlatti, Giovanni Paisiello, and Giovan Battista Pergolesi. While the orphanage no longer remains, the building is used for concerts, including by the foundation of Centro di Musica Antica Pietà de' Turchini, which specializes in performing classical Neapolitan music, including works associated historically with the conservatory associated with this church and orphanage complex.

== Gallery ==
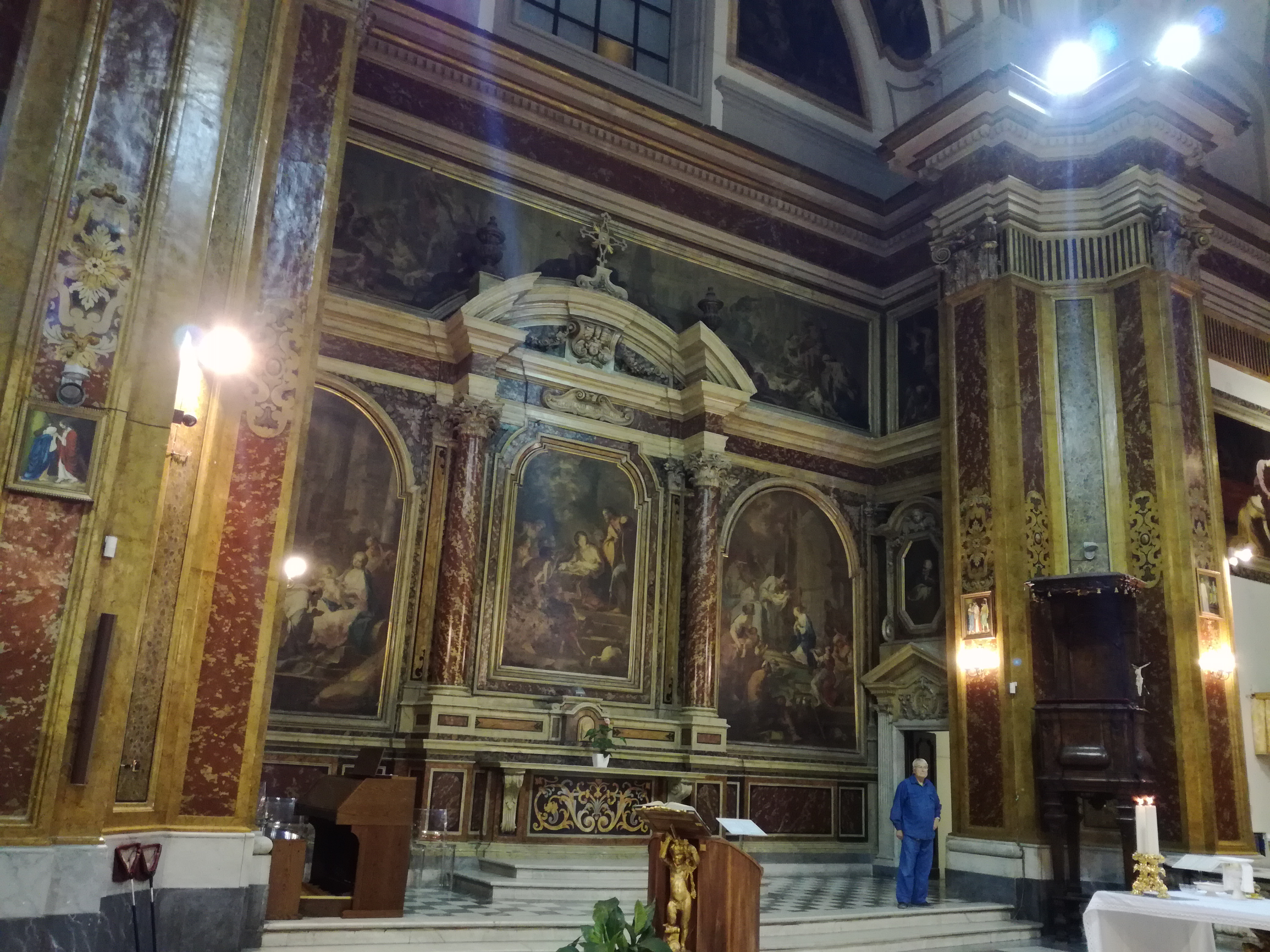
One of the two lateral altars.

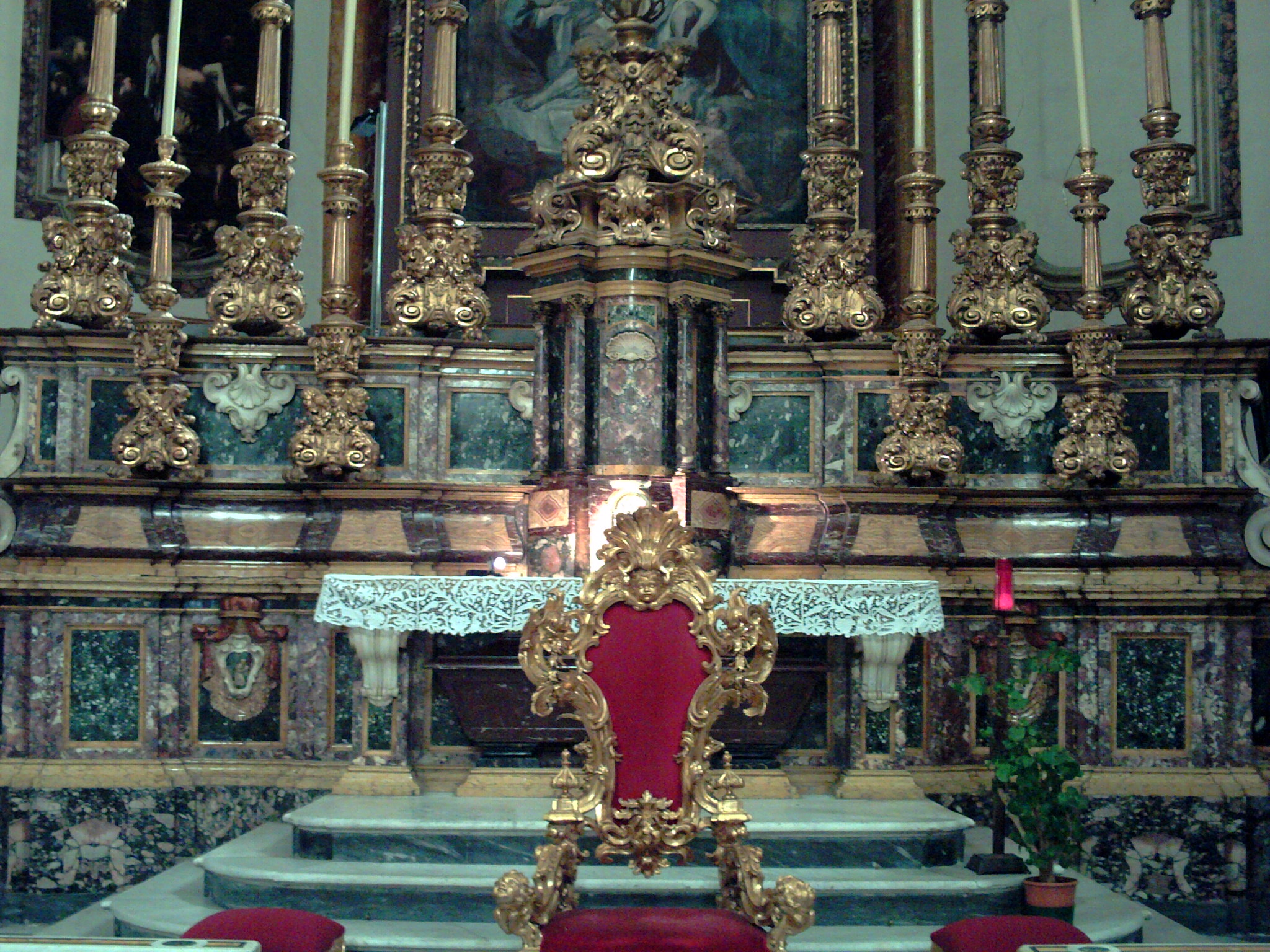
Main altar

== Bibliography ==
- Vincenzo Regina, Le chiese di Napoli. Viaggio indimenticabile attraverso la storia artistica, architettonica, letteraria, civile e spirituale della Napoli sacra, Newton e Compton editore, Napoli 2004.

== Related Entries ==
- Music conservatories of Naples, includes a section for the Conservatorio della Pietà dei Turchini.
