= Pietro de' Crescenzi =

Bolognese jurist and writer on agriculture (1233–1320)

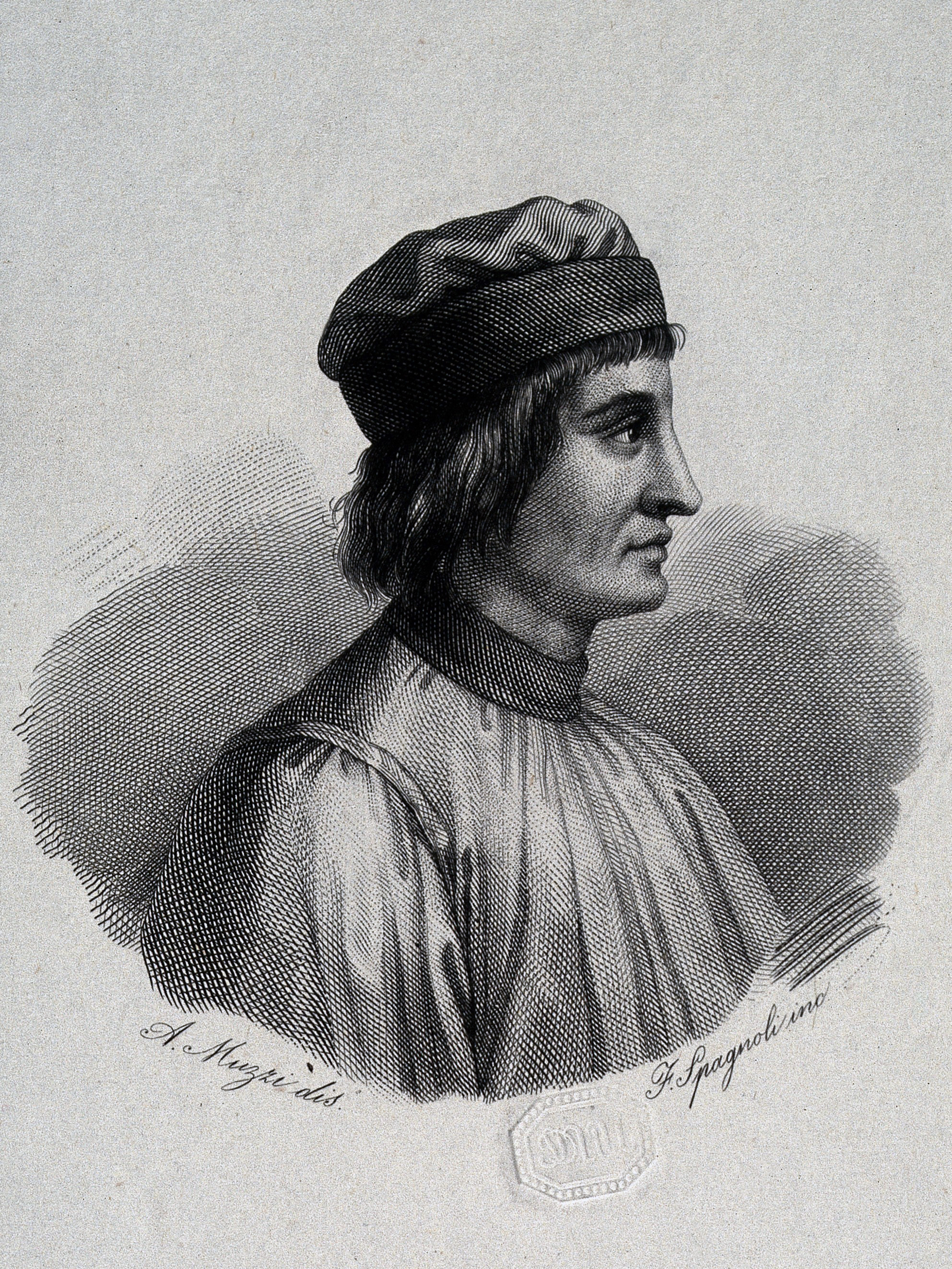
- Nineteenth-century engraved portrait of de' Crescenzi after Antonio Muzzi
- Born: c. 1230/35; Bologna, Commune of Bologna
- Died: c. 1320 (aged c. 85–90); Bologna, Commune of Bologna
- Resting place: Basilica di San Domenico, Bologna
- Citizenship: Bolognese
- Occupations: Jurist; writer
- Spouses: Geraldina de' Castagnoli (m. 1274; died 1287); Antonia de' Nascentori (m. 1289)
- Writing career
- Language: Latin
- Notable work: Ruralia commoda

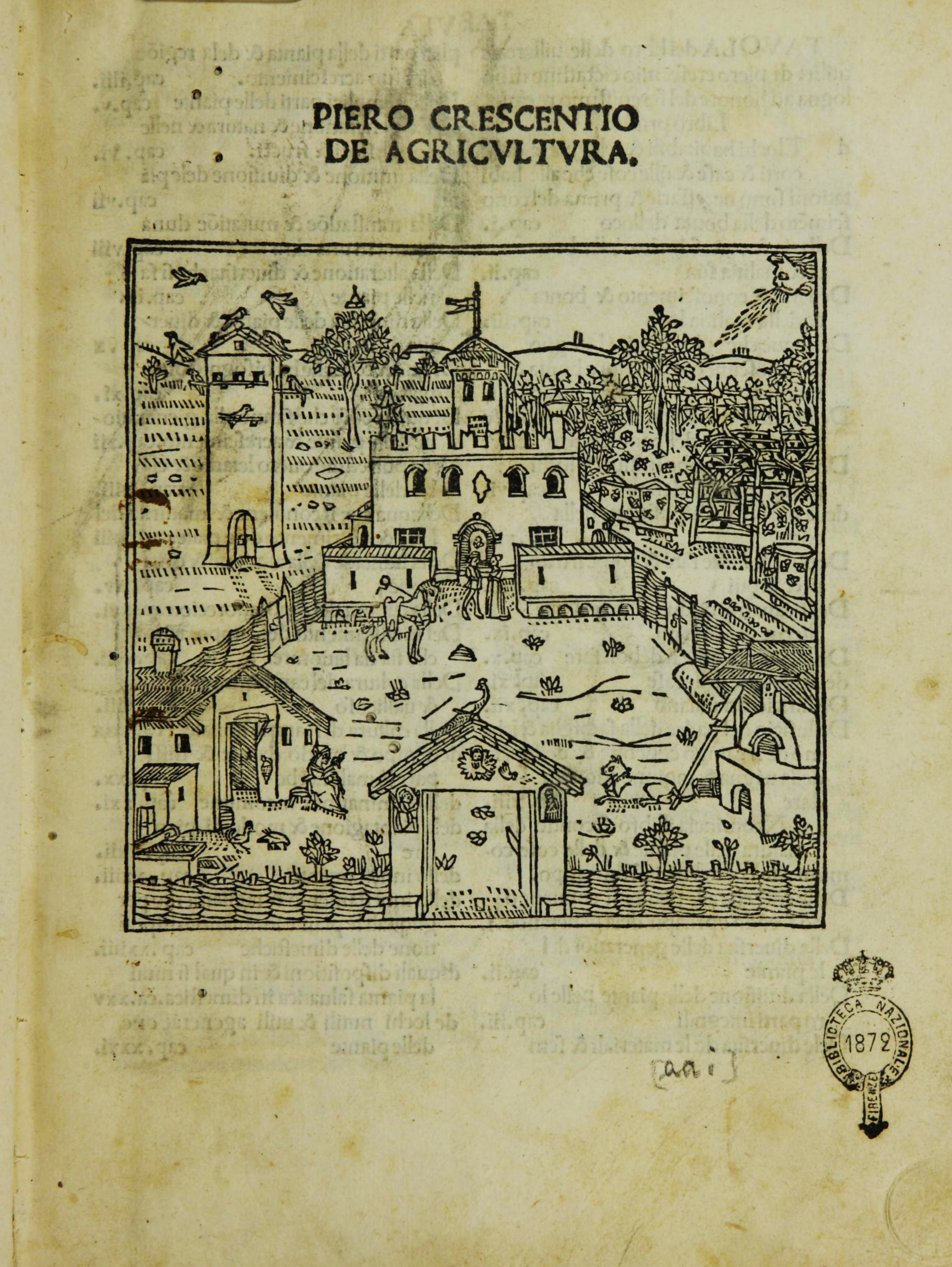
Frontispiece of the De agricultura in the vernacular edition of Matteo Capcasa, printed in Venice in 1495

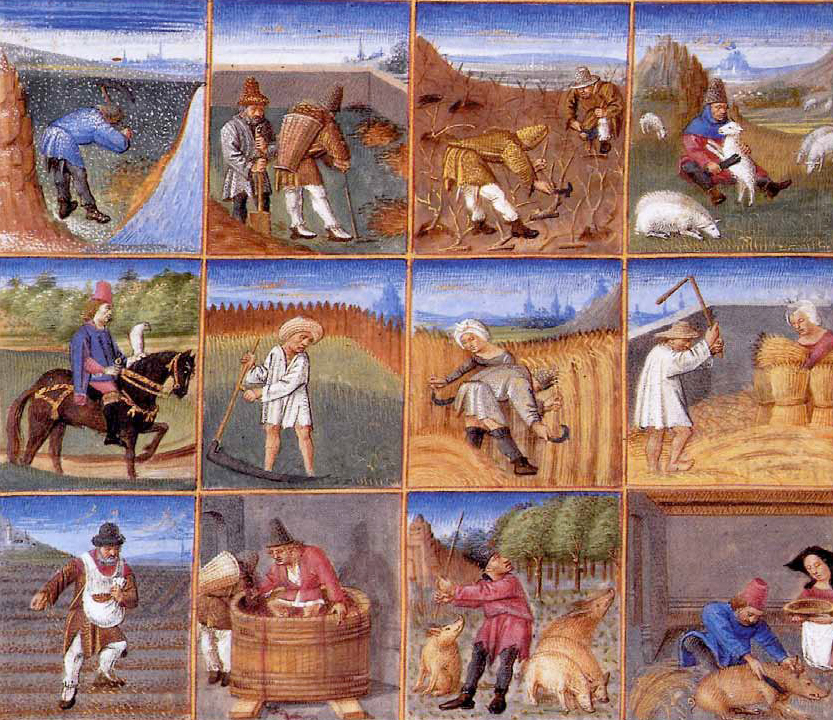
Part of the Crescenzi calendar

Pietro de' Crescenzi (Latin: Petrus de Crescentiis; c. 1230/35 – c. 1320), also known as Pietro Crescenzi(o), Pier Crescenzi(o) and other variations of his name, (Note: Other variant spellings of his name include: Petrus de Crescentius, Petrus Crescentiensis, Peter de Crescentiis (Latin); Pietro dei Crescenzi, Pietro de Crescenzi, Pier de' Crescenzi, Pier de Crescenzi, Piero Crescienti, Piero de Crescenzi and Piero de' Crescenzi (Italian).) was an Italian jurist from Bologna, now remembered for his writings on horticulture and agriculture, the Ruralia commoda.

== Life ==
Pietro de' Crescenzi was born in Bologna in about 1235; the only evidence for his date of birth is the annotation "septuagenarian" in the Ruralia commoda, dated with some certainty between 1304 and 1309. He was educated at the University of Bologna in logic, medicine, the natural sciences and law, but did not take his doctorate. Crescenzi practiced as a lawyer and judge from about 1269 until 1299, travelling widely in Italy in the course of his work.

In January 1274, he married Geraldina de' Castagnoli, with whom he had at least five children. She died in or shortly after December 1287. In January 1289, he married Antonia de' Nascentori, with whom he also had several children.

After his retirement in 1290, he divided his time between Bologna and his country estate, the Villa dell'Olmo outside the walls of Bologna. During this time, he wrote the Ruralia commoda, an agricultural treatise based largely on classical and medieval sources (mostly Albertus Magnus), as well as his own experience as a landowner.

It is not known when de' Crescenzi died. His last will is dated 23 June 1320; a legal document dated 20 February 1321 describes him as dead, at the age of almost ninety.

== The Ruralia commoda ==
The Ruralia commoda, sometimes known as the Liber ruralium commodorum ("book of rural benefits"), was completed some time between 1304 and 1309, and was dedicated to Charles II of Naples. King Charles V of France ordered a French translation in 1373. In 1471 it was printed in Latin for the first time, in Augsburg and Strasbourg. After circulating in numerous manuscript copies, Crescenzi's treatise became the first printed modern text on agriculture when it was published in Augsburg by Johann Schüssler in 1471. Some 57 editions in Latin, Italian, French, and German appeared during the following century, as did two editions in Polish.

=== Sections ===
The structure and content of the Ruralia commoda is substantially based on the De re rustica of Columella, written in the first century AD, even though this work was not available to de' Crescenzi, and was known only in fragments until a complete version was discovered in a monastery library by Poggio Bracciolini during the Council of Constance, between 1414 and 1418. While de' Crescenzi cites Columella twelve times, all the citations are indirect, and taken from the Opus agriculturae of Rutilius Taurus Aemilianus Palladius. Like the De re rustica of Columella, the Ruralia commoda is divided into 12 parts:

1. Siting and layout of a manor, villa or farm, considering climate, winds, and water supply; also the duties of the head of the estate
2. Botanical properties of plants and horticultural techniques
3. Agriculture of cereals and building of a granary
4. Vines and winemaking
5. Arboriculture—trees useful for food and medicine
6. Horticulture—plants useful for food and medicine
7. Management of meadows and woodland
8. Pleasure gardens
9. Animal husbandry and bee keeping
10. Hunting and fishing
11. General summary
12. Monthly calendar of tasks

== Legacy ==
Crescenzi was so well known his name was used to advertise books as late as 1602. He also inspired a genre of German literature called Hausväterliteratur ('reading for the father of the family'), practical guides about crop husbandry, gardening, cattle breeding, hunting, etiquette, and so on for peasant farmers . Books in this genre were published into the 19th century.

== See also ==
- History of agriculture
