= Papal appointment =

Medieval method of selecting a pope

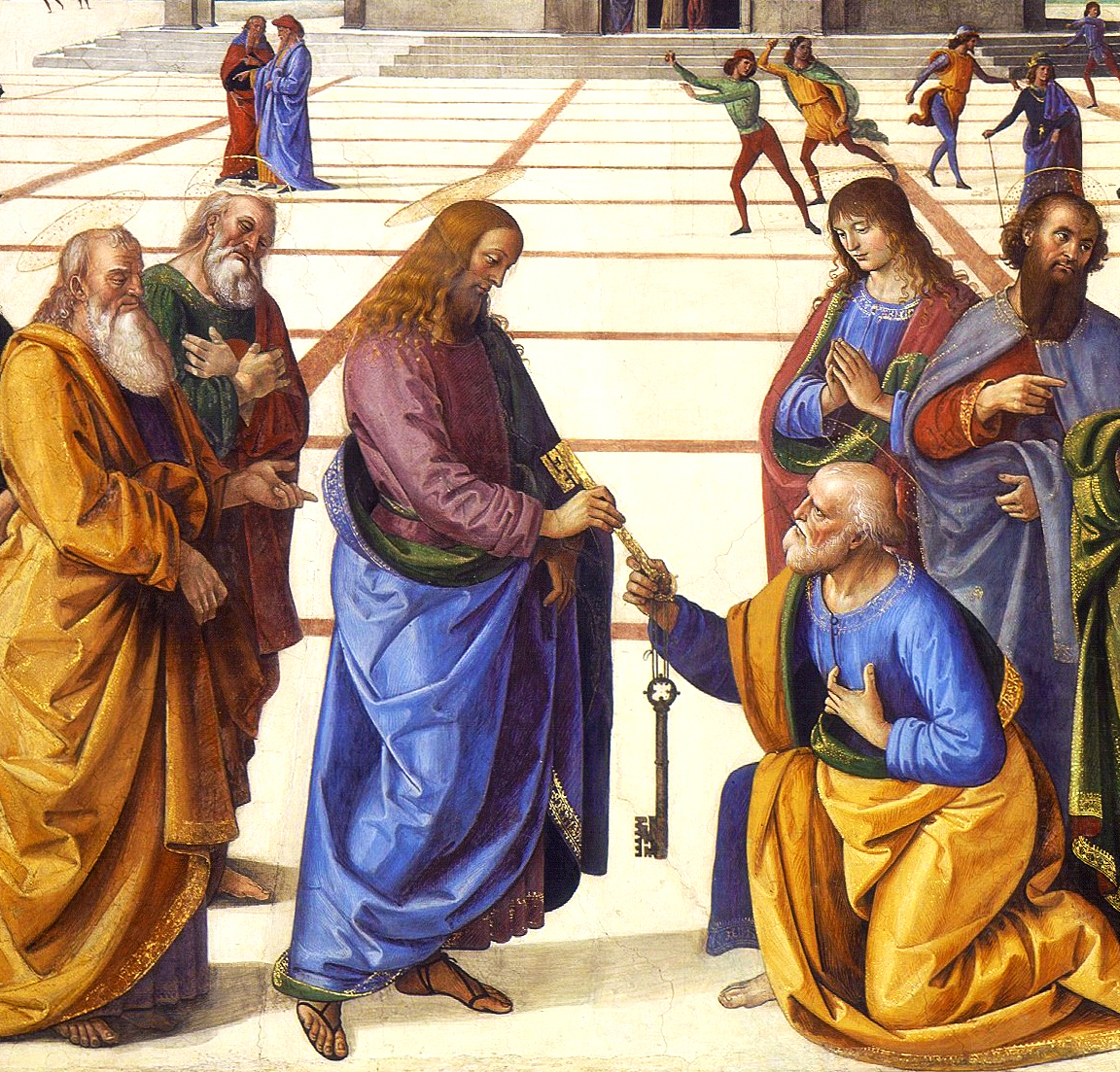
According to Catholic doctrine, Jesus appointed Saint Peter as the first pope.

Papal appointment was a medieval method of selecting the Pope. Popes have always been selected by a council of Church fathers; however, Papal selection before 1059 was often characterized by confirmation or nomination by secular European rulers or by the preceding pope. The later procedures of the Papal conclave are in large part designed to prohibit interference of secular rulers, which to some extent characterized the first millennium of the Roman Catholic Church, e. g. in practices such as the creation of crown-cardinals and the claimed but invalid jus exclusivae. Appointment may have taken several forms, with a variety of roles for the laity and civic leaders, Byzantine and Germanic emperors, and noble Roman families. The role of the election vis-a-vis the general population and the clergy was prone to vary considerably, with a nomination carrying weight that ranged from nearly determinative to merely suggestive, or as ratification of a concluded election.

The practice originated in late antiquity, where on many occasions the Roman Emperor stepped in to resolve disputes over the legitimacy of Papal contenders. An important precedent from this period is an edict of Emperor Honorius, issued after a synod he convoked to depose Antipope Eulalius. The practice passed to, and grew with, the King of the Ostrogoths, and then the Byzantine Emperor (or his delegate, the Exarch of Ravenna). After an interregnum, the Kings of the Franks and the Holy Roman Emperor (whose selection the Pope also sometimes influenced), generally assumed the role of confirming Papal elections. For a period, today known as the "saeculum obscurum", the practice passed from the Emperor to powerful Roman nobles—the Crescentii and then the Counts of Tusculum.

In many cases, the Papal coronation was delayed until the election had been confirmed. Some antipopes were similarly, putatively, appointed. The practice ended with the conclusion of the Investiture Controversy (cf. confirmation of bishops) due largely to the efforts of Cardinal Hildebrand, the future Pope Gregory VII, who was a guiding force in the selection of his four predecessors, and the 1059 Papal bull In Nomine Domini of Pope Nicholas II; some writers consider this practice to be an extreme form of "investiture" in and of itself.

Although the practice was forbidden by the Council of Antioch (341) and the Council of Rome (465), the Bishops of Rome, as with other bishops, often exercised great control over selection of their successors, even after the sixth century. In addition, most popes of the fourth to twelfth centuries were nominated or confirmed by a secular power.

== Ancient Rome ==
As to the earliest ages, St. Peter himself constituted a senate for the Roman Church, consisting of twenty-four priests and deacons. These were the councillors of the Bishop of Rome and the electors of his successors. This statement is drawn from a canon in the "Corpus Juris Canonici" (can. "Si Petrus", caus. 8, Q. 1). Historians and canonists, however, generally hold that the Roman bishopric was filled on its vacancy in the same manner as other bishoprics, that is, the election of the new pope was made by the neighbouring bishops and the clergy and faithful of Rome. Nevertheless, some maintain that the naming of the successor of St. Peter was restricted to the Roman clergy, and that the people were admitted to a part in the elections only after the time of Sylvester I (fourth century).

After Constantine had given peace to the Church, the Christian Roman emperors often took part in the institution of a new pope and at times their influence was very marked. From the fourth century onwards, therefore, a new force had to be reckoned with. The occasion for the interference of the Roman emperors and later of the kings of Italy was afforded by disputed elections to the papal chair. The most noted of the earlier instance was at the election of Boniface I (418). This gave occasion to the decree (c. 8, dist. 79) that when an election was disputed a new candidate should be chosen.

Pope	Pontificate	Notes
1 Peter, Apostle, Saint	Reigned 33–67	According to Catholic doctrine, Peter was appointed Pope when Jesus said: "Thou art Peter, and upon this rock I will build My Church, and even the gates of Hell shall not prevail against it. Behold, I give you the keys to the kingdom of Heaven."
2 Linus, Saint	Reigned c.67 – 76	elected by Church fathers following martyrdom of St. Peter
3 Anacletus, Saint	Reigned 76–88	aka Cletus
4 Clement I, Saint	Reigned 88–97	
5 Evaristus, Saint	Reigned c.98 – c.106	Aristus in the Liberian Catalogue
6 Alexander I, Saint	Reigned c.106 – 115	
7 Sixtus I, Saint	Reigned 115–125	XYSTUS in the oldest documents
8 Telesphorus, Saint	Reigned 125–136	
9 Hyginus, Saint	Reigned c.136 – 140	
10 Pius I, Saint	Reigned c.140 – c.154	
11 Anicetus, Saint	Reigned c.157 – 168	
12 Soter, Saint	Reigned c.166 – c.174	
13 Eleutherius, Saint	Reigned c.175 – 189	
14 Victor I, Saint	Reigned 189 – c.198	
15 Zephyrinus, Saint	Reigned 198–217	
16 Callistus I, Saint	Reigned 218 – c.222	
17 Urban I, Saint	Reigned 222–230	
18 Pontian, Saint	Reigned 230–235	
19 Anterus, Saint	Reigned 235–236	aka Anteros
20 Fabian, Saint	Reigned 236–250	A dove flew into the crowd and settled on Fabian's head; the gathered clergy and laity took this as a sign that Fabian had been anointed by the Holy Spirit, and he was chosen the 20th Pope by acclamation
21 Cornelius, Saint	Reigned 251–253	
22 Lucius I, Saint	Reigned 253–254	
23 Stephen I, Saint	Reigned 254–257	
24 Sixtus II, Saint	Reigned 257–258	XYSTUS in the oldest documents
25 Dionysius, Saint	Reigned 260–268	
26 Felix I, Saint	Reigned 269–274	
27 Eutychianus, Saint	Reigned 275–283	
28 Caius, Saint	Reigned 283–296	
29 Marcellinus, Saint	Reigned 296–304	
30 Marcellus I, Saint	Reigned 308–309	
31 Eusebius, Saint	Reigned 309 or 310	
32 Miltiades, Saint	Reigned 311–314	
33 Sylvester I, Saint	Reigned 314–335	
34 Mark, Saint	Reigned 336; aka Marcus	
35 Julius I, Saint	Reigned 337–352	
36 Liberius	Reigned 352–366	Considered a saint by the Eastern and Oriental Orthodox Churches but not officially canonized by the Roman Catholic Church
37 Damasus I, Saint	Reigned 366–383	
38 Siricius, Saint	Reigned 384–399	
39 Anastasius I, Saint	Reigned 399–401	
40 Innocent I, Saint	Reigned 401–417	
41 Zosimus, Saint	Reigned 417–418	
42 Boniface I, Saint	Reigned 418–422	
43 Celestine I, Saint	Reigned 422–432	
44 Sixtus III, Saint	Reigned 432–440	XYSTUS in the oldest documents
45 Leo I, Saint	Reigned 440–461	
46 Hilarus, Saint	Reigned 461–468	
47 Simplicius, Saint	Reigned 468–483	
48 Felix III (II), Saint	Reigned 483–492	
49 Gelasius I, Saint	Reigned 492–496	
50 Anastasius II	Reigned 496–498	
51 Symmachus, Saint	Reigned 498–514	
52 Hormisdas, Saint	Reigned 514–523	
53 John I, Saint	Reigned 523 – c.526	

== Ostrogoths ==
On November 22, 498, both Pope Symmachus and Antipope Laurentius were elected pope; both Byzantine Emperor Anastasius I and the Gothic King Theodoric the Great originally supported Laurentius, who was installed in the Lateran Palace, but Symmachus prevailed when Theodoric expelled Laurentius from Rome, fearing that he was too influenced by the Byzantine ruler.

Appointer	Pope	Pontificate	Notes
Theodoric the Great/Athalaric	Felix IV	July 13, 526 – September 22, 530	"On Theodoric's recommendation, Felix was elected pope, and his election was confirmed by Athalaric, the successor of Theodoric"; Appointed "for all practical purposes" by Theodoric
Pope Felix IV/Athalaric	Boniface II	September 17, 530 – October 532	Appointment meant to avoid split between "Byzantine" and "Gothic" factions
Athalaric	John II	January 2, 533 – May 8, 535	During the sede vacante of over two months, "shameless trafficking in sacred things was indulged in. Even sacred vessels were exposed for sale. The matter was brought before the Senate, and before the Arian Ostrogothic Court at Ravenna" (cf. Senatus Consultum)
Theodahad	Agapetus I	May 13, 535 – April 22, 536	"Theodahad was well placed to coerce the new pope Agapetus, for he had been elected with his support"
Theodahad	Silverius	June 8, 536 – June 20, 537	Legitimate son of Pope Hormisdas

== Byzantine ==
"We have reached the turning-point in Papal history. There had been a Duke of Rome, resident of the Imperial house on the Palatine; an exercitus Romanus, which comprised the nobles who, however mixed their blood, fabled a descent from the Cornelii and the other Patricians of classic renown; last, but greatest, the Pontifex Maximus held his court with its array of clerics about the Church of the Saviour. And how did he stand to Dukes and nobles? While the Emperor governed, he was a subject, his election not valid till confirmed from the Golden Horn; and the "army," which claimed to be the Roman People, shared in his naming with the "venerable clergy." Now, was the Duke to continue when the Emperor has ceased? If not, the whole of Italy might be absorbed into the Lombard Kingdom, and the Pope, exercising a purely spiritual jurisdiction, would still have been a subject, liable to the military chief at Pavia, whose government he would consecrate but never share."

— William Francis Barry, 1902

Appointer	Pope	Pontificate	Notes
Justinian I	Vigilius	March 29, 537 – 555	Previously appointed by his successor Pope Boniface II
Justinian I	Pelagius I	April 16, 556 – March 4, 561	"Pelagius, as the nominee of Justinian, at once succeeded on his arrival in Rome, but most of the clergy, suspecting his orthodoxy, and believing him to have had some share in the unlooked-for removal of his predecessor, shunned his fellowship, and only two bishops and presbyter could be got to take part in his ordination to the pontificate"
Justinian I	John III	July 17, 561 – July 13, 574	"At the death of Pelagius I, Rome had been under Byzantine control for many years, and according to the procedure imposed by Constantinople, the name of the elected candidate had to be submitted to the emperor for approval. This explains the long vacancy [...]"
Justin II	Benedict I	June 2, 575 – June 30, 579	"The ravages of the Lombards rendered it very difficult to communicate with the emperor at Constantinople, who claimed the privilege of confirming the election of the popes. Hence there was a vacancy of nearly eleven months between the death of John III and the arrival of the imperial confirmation of Benedict's election, 2 June, 575."
Tiberius II Constantine	Pelagius II	November 26, 579 – February 7, 590	"He succeeded Benedict I, when the Lombards were besieging Rome, but his consecration was delayed in the hope of securing the confirmation of the election by the emperor. But the blockade of Rome by the Lombards, and their control of the great thoroughfares was effective and, after four months, he was consecrated (26 Nov., 579)."
Maurice	Gregory I	September 3, 590 – March 12, 604	"The choice of a successor lay with the clergy and people of Rome, and without any hesitation they elected Gregory [... Gregory] wrote personally to the Emperor Maurice, begging him with all earnestness not to confirm the election. Germanus, prefect of the city, suppresses this letter, however, and sent instead of it the formal schedule of the election. In the interval while awaiting the emperor's reply the business of the vacant see was transacted by Gregory [...] At length, after six months of waiting, came the emperor's confirmation of Gregory's election."
Phocas	Sabinian	September 13, 604 – February 22, 606	"[...] chosen to succeed Gregory soon after the death of that great pontiff; but as the imperial confirmation of his election did not arrive for some months, he was not consecrated till September."
Phocas	Boniface III	February 19, 607 – November 12, 607	"[...] as apocrisiarius, or legate, to the court of Constantinople, where, by his tact and prudence, he appears to have gained the favourable regard of the Emperor Phocas"
Phocas	Boniface IV	August 25, 608 – May 8, 615	"Boniface obtained leave from the Emperor Phocas [...]"
Heraclius	Severinus	October 638 – August 2, 640	"Severinus [...] was elected [...] and envoys were at once sent to Constantinople, to obtain the confirmation of his election (Oct., 638). But the emperor, instead of granting the confirmation, ordered Severinus to sign his Ecthesis [...] This the pope-elect refused to do [...] Meanwhile his envoys at Constantinople, [...] finally secured the imperial confirmation."

=== Exarchate of Ravenna ===
Appointer	Pope	Pontificate	Notes
Isaac the Armenian	John IV	December 24, 640 – October 12, 642	"As John's consecration followed very soon after his election, it is supposed that the papal elections were now confirmed by the exarchs resident at Ravenna."
Isaac the Armenian	Theodore I	November 24, 642 – May 14, 649	"His election as pope was promptly confirmed by the Exarch of Ravenna, perhaps because he was a Greek, and he was consecrated 24 Nov., 642."
None	Martin I	July 649 – September 16, 655	"After his election, Martin had himself consecrated without waiting for the imperial confirmation, and soon called a council in the Lateran [...] The Acts with a Greek translation were also sent to the Emperor Constans II."
Theodore I Calliopas	Eugene I	August 10, 654 – June 2, 657	
None	Vitalian	July 30, 657 – January 27, 672	"Like his predecessor, Vitalian sought to restore the connection with Constantinople by friendly advances to the Eastern Emperor Constans II (641-668) and to prepare the way for the settlement of the Monothelite controversy. He sent letters (synodica) announcing his elevation by envoys both to the emperor and to Patriarch Peter of Constantinople [...]"

== Byzantine ==
Appointer	Pope	Pontificate	Notes
Constantine IV	Leo II	December 681 – July 3, 683	"Though elected pope a few days after the death of St. Agatho (10 June, 681), he was not consecrated till after the lapse of a year and seven months (17 Aug., 682). Under Leo's predecessor St. Agatho, negotiations had been opened between the Holy See and Emperor Constantine Pogonatus concerning the relations of the Byzantine Court to papal elections. Constantine had already promised Agatho to abolish or reduce the tax which for about a century the popes had had to pay to the imperial treasury on the occasion of their consecration, and under Leo's successor he made other changes in what had hitherto been required of the Roman Church at the time of a papal election. In all probability, therefore, it was continued correspondence on this matter which caused the delay of the imperial confirmation of Leo's election, and hence the long postponement of his consecration."

=== Exarchate of Ravenna ===
Appointer	Pope	Pontificate	Notes
Theodore II*	Benedict II	683/June 26, 684 – May 8, 685	"To abridge the vacancies of the Holy See which followed the deaths of the popes, he obtained from the Emperor Constantine Pogonatus a decree which either abolished imperial confirmations altogether or made them obtainable from the exarch in Italy."
None	John V	July 12, 685 – August 2, 686	"The necessity of waiting for the imperial confirmation of papal elections having been abolished by Constantine Pognatus, John was straightway conducted to the Lateran palace as pope."
Theodore II*	Conon	October 21, 686 – September 22, 687	"He was consecrated (21 October, 686) after notice of his election had been sent to the Exarch of Ravenna, or after it had been confirmed by him."
None	Sergius I	December 15, 687 – September 8, 701	"While Pope Conon lay dying, the archdeacon Pascal offered the exarch a large sum to bring about his election as his successor. Through the exarch's influence the archdeacon was accordingly elected by a number of people; about the same time another faction elected the archpriest Theodore. The mass of clergy and people, however, set them both aside and chose Sergius, who was duly consecrated."
None	John VI	March 1, 705 – October 18, 707	"Some time during his reign there came to Rome from Sicily Theophylactus, "chamberlain, patricius, and exarch of Italy". After the treatment which some of his predecessors in the exarchate had meted out to the popes, [...] local militias hurriedly marched to Rome [...] To avoid bloodshed, John sent a number of priests to them, and succeeded in pacifying them; as far at least as the exarch himself was concerned. [...] Taking advantage of this [...] the Lombards renewed their attacks [...] Several towns belonging to the Duchy of Rome were seized, Gisulf advanced as far as "Horrea" Puteoli - or perhaps the "fundus Horrea" at the fifth milestone on the Via Latina. As "there was no one who had power to resist him by force of arms", the pope [...] sent a number of priests furnished with money into the camp of the Lombard duke."
Eutychius*	Gregory III	March 18, 731 – November 28, 741	"[...] the Romans elected him pope by acclamation, when he was accompanying the funeral procession of his predecessor, 11 February, 731. As he was not consecrated for more than a month after his election, it is presumed that he waited for the confirmation of his election by the exarch at Ravenna."
None	Zachary	December 3, 741 – March 14/March 22, 752	"After the burial of his predecessor Gregory III on 29 November, 741, he was immediately and unanimously elected pope and consecrated and enthroned on 5 December. [...] Soon after his elevation he notified Constantinople of his election; it is noticeable that his synodica (letter) was not addressed to the iconoclastic Patriarch Anastasius but to the Church of Constantinople."

== Frankish interregnum ==
Appointer	Pope	Pontificate	Notes
None	Stephen II	March 26, 752 – April 26, 757	"He had at once to face the Lombards who were resolved to bring all Italy under their sway. With the capture of Ravenna (751), they had put an end to the power of the Byzantine exarchs and were preparing to seize the Duchy of Rome. In vain did Stephen apply for help to Constantinople [...] He accordingly [...] endeavoured to obtain assistance from Pepin and the Franks. [...] he went himself to Gaul to plead his cause before the Frankish king. Receiving a most favourable reception, he crowned Pepin as King of the Franks [...]"
None	Paul I	May 29, 757 – June 28, 767	Brother of Stephen II; "While Paul was with his dying brother at the Lateran, a party of the Romans gathered in the house of Archdeacon Theophylact in order to secure the latter's succession to the papal see. However, immediately after the burial of Stephen (died 26 April, 757), Paul was elected by a large majority, and received episcopal consecration on the twenty-ninth of May. Paul continued his predecessor's policy towards the Frankish king, Pepin, and thereby continued the papal supremacy over Rome and the districts of central Italy in opposition to the efforts of the Lombards and the Eastern Empire."
None	Stephen III	August 1, 767 – January 24, 772	"Paul I was not dead when trouble began about the election of his successor. Toto of Nepi with a body of Tuscans burst into Rome, and, despite the opposition of the primicerius Christopher, forcibly intruded his brother Constantine, a layman, into the chair of Peter (June, 767). In the spring of 768, however, Christopher and his son Sergius contrived to escape from the city, and with the aid of the Lombards deposed the usurper. They were also able to overthrow the monk Philip, whom some of their Lombard allies had clandestinely elected pope. By their efforts Stephen [...] was at length canonically elected and consecrated (7 August, 768). [...] Through Stephen's support the archdeacon Leo was enabled to hold the See of Ravenna against a lay intruder, and in turn through the support of the brothers Charlemagne and Carloman, Kings of the Franks, Stephen was able to recover some territories from the Lombards. But their king, Desiderius [...] brought about a marriage between his daughter and Charlemagne, and in some mysterious manner effected the fall of the pope's chief ministers, Christopher and Sergius."
None	Adrian I	August 1, 767 – December 26, 795	Cf. Desiderius "Pavia fell into the hands of Charles; the kingdom of the Lombards was extinguished, and the Papacy was forever delivered from its persistent and hereditary foe."

== Kings of the Franks/Holy Roman Empire ==
Appointer	Pope	Pontificate	Notes
Charlemagne*	Leo III	December 26, 795 – June 12, 816	"Pope Adrian died in 795 and Leo III was chosen to fill his place. This election Charlemagne confirmed, sending Angilbert, Abbot of St. Regnier, to Rome to carry to the new Pope admonitions about the proper filling of his office." "He was elected on the very day his predecessor was buried (26 Dec., 795), and consecrated on the following day. It is quite possible that this haste may have been due to a desire on the part of the Romans to anticipate any interference of the Franks with their freedom of election."
Louis the Pious*	Stephen IV	June 12, 816 – January 24, 817	"[...] he was elected pope and consecrated immediately after Leo's death, about 22 June, 816. He at once caused the Romans to take an oath to the Emperor Louis the Pious as their suzerain, and he sent notice of his election to him. He then went to France and crowned Louis."
Louis the Pious*	Paschal I	January 25, 817 – February 11, 824	"On the death of Stephen IV (24 January, 817) Paschal was unanimously chosen as his successor. On the following day he was consecrated and enthroned. He entered into relations with Emperor Louis, sending him several ambassadors in rapid succession. In 817 he received from the emperor a document, "Pactum Ludovicianum", confirming the rights and possessions of the Holy See. This document with later amendments is still extant [...]"
Louis the Pious*	Eugene II	May 8, 824 – August 827	"[...] Pascal I [...] had turned for support to the Frankish power. [...] nobles [...] secured the consecration of Eugene [...] The election of Eugene II was a triumph for the Franks [...] Emperor Louis the Pious accordingly sent his son Lothair to Rome to strengthen the Frankish influence. [...] A concordat or constitution was then agreed upon between the pope and the emperor (824). [...] By command of the pope and Lothair the people had to swear that, saving the fidelity they had promised the pope, they would obey the Emperors Louis and Lothair; [...] and would not suffer the pope-elect to be consecrated save in the presence of the emperor's envoys."
Louis the Pious*	Gregory IV	827 – January 844	"This man [...] was raised to the chair of Peter [...] mainly by the instrumentality of the secular nobility of Rome who were then securing a preponderating influence in papal elections. But the representatives in Rome of the Emperor Louis the Pious would not allow him to be consecrated until his election had been approved by their master. This interference caused such delay that it was not, seemingly, till about March, 828, that he began to govern the Church."
None	Sergius II	January 844 – January 7, 847	"As Sergius was, after a disputed election, consecrated without any reference to the Emperor Lothaire, the latter was indignant, and sent his son Louis with an army to examine into the validity of the election. But Sergius succeeded in pacifying Louis, whom he crowned king, but to whom he would not take an oath of fealty."
None	Leo IV	January 847 – July 17, 855	"[...] he was consecrated (10 April, 847) without the consent of the emperor."
None*	Benedict III	855 – April 7, 858	"On the death of Leo IV (17 July, 855) Benedict was chosen to succeed him, and envoys were despatched to secure the ratification of the decree of election by the Emperors Lothaire and Louis II. But the legates betrayed their trust and allowed themselves to be influenced in favour of the ambitious and excommunicated Cardinal Anastasius. The imperial missi, gained over in turn by them, endeavoured to force Anastasius on the Roman Church."
Louis II of Italy	Nicholas I	April 24, 858 – November 13, 867	"In 858 Louis had come to Rome for the Easter celebrations; he had already begun his return journey, when he was greeted with the news of Pope Benedict's demise (17 April). He immediately went back to Rome, and by his influence decided the election of the deacon Nicholas. The clergy were in favour of another candidate, but as the emperor's choice had fallen on a man of worth, the election was confirmed without much ado." "After Benedict's death (7 April, 858) the Emperor Louis II, who was in the neighbourhood of Rome, came into the city to exert his influence upon the election. On 24 April Nicholas was elected pope, and on the same day was consecrated and enthroned in St. Peter's in the presence of the emperor."
Unknown	Adrian II	December 14, 867 – December 14, 872	"He strove to maintain peace among the greedy and incompetent descendants of Charlemagne."
None*	Marinus I	December 16, 882 – May 15, 884	"There is reason for believing that Marinus I was elected on the very day of the death of John VIII (16 Dec., 882), and that he was consecrated without waiting for the consent of the incompetent emperor, Charles the Fat."
None	Stephen V	885 – September 14, 891	"He was consecrated in September, 885, without waiting for the imperial confirmation; but when Charles the Fat found with what unanimity he had been elected he let the matter rest."
Lambert II of Spoleto*	Romanus	August 897 – November 897	"His coins bear the name of the Emperor Lambert, and his own monogram with 'Scs. Petrus'"
Lambert II of Spoleto*	John IX	January 898 – January 900	"At this period factions filled the city of Rome, and one of them tried to force their candidate, Sergius, afterwards Sergius III, on the papal throne in opposition to John. Perhaps because he was favoured by the ducal House of Spoleto, John was able to maintain his position, and Sergius was driven from the city and excommunicated. [...] The Synod of Rome [...] decided that the pope-elect was not to be consecrated except in the presence of the imperial envoys."
Unknown	Leo V	July 903 – September 903	"Very little is known of him. We have no certainty either as to when he was elected or as to exactly how long he reigned."

== Counts of Tusculum ==
Appointer	Pope	Pontificate	Notes
Marozia, Senatrix of Rome	Sergius III	January 29, 904 – April 14, 911	Mistress of Marozia
Marozia, Senatrix of Rome	John X	March 914 – May 928	Appointed and then deposed by Marozia
Marozia, Senatrix of Rome	Leo VI	May 928 – December 928	
Marozia, Senatrix of Rome	Stephen VII	December 928 – February 931	
Marozia, Senatrix of Rome	John XI	February/March 931 – December 935	Illegitimate son of Pope Sergius III and Marozia, and half-brother of Alberic II
Alberic II of Spoleto, Senator of Rome	Leo VII	3 January 936 – 13 July 939	Cooperated with Henry I and Otto I
Alberic II of Spoleto, Senator of Rome	Marinus II	October 30, 942 – May 946	"[...] he was one of the popes placed on the throne of St. Peter by the power of Alberic, Prince of the Romans [...]"
Alberic II of Spoleto, Senator of Rome	Agapetus II	May 10, 946 – December 955	"The temporal power had practically vanished and Rome was ruled by the vigorous Princeps and Senator Albericht, who was the prototype of the later Italian tyrants."
Alberic II of Spoleto, Senator of Rome	John XII	December 16, 955 – May 14, 964	Son of Alberic II "During his lifetime, his successor was virtually appointed in the person of Albericht's notorious son Octavian, later John XII, whose father forced the Romans to swear that they would elect him as their temporal and spiritual lord upon the demise of Agapetus."

== Holy Roman Empire ==
"Soon after the German Emperors were seated on the throne, the political subjection of the Pope is, as a matter of history, unquestionable. [...] For a time this doctrine was a formidable instrument in the hands of the Emperor. The great Protector of the Church, in the exercise of his office, watched over the interests of the Roman See, convened general councils, and claimed the tremendous prerogative of nominating, or at least confirming, the Pope. Such a prerogative was exercised from the times of Otho the Great to that of Henry IV. Henry III deposed three schismatical Popes, and nominated more than one German Pope."

— Robert Phillimore, 1855

Appointer	Pope	Pontificate	Notes
None*	Benedict V	May 22, 964 – June 23, 964	"Benedict V was elected pope (May, 964) in very critical circumstances. The powerful emperor, Otho I, had forcibly deposed [...] John XII, and had replaced him by a nominee of his own who took the title of Leo VIII. But [...] the Romans expelled Leo, and on the death (14 May, 964) of [...] John XII, elected [...] Benedict [...] Otho [...] marched on Rome, seized Benedict, and put an end to his pontificate [...] After reinstating Leo, Otho left Rome and carried Benedict with him to Germany."
Otto I, Holy Roman Emperor	Leo VIII	July 964 – March 1, 965	Sometimes considered an antipope for the first year of his papacy
Otto I, Holy Roman Emperor	John XIII	October 1, 965 – September 6, 972	"In presence of the imperial envoys, Liutprand, Bishop of Cremona, and Otgar, Bishop of Speyer, the emperor's candidate, John, Bishop of Narni, was elected pope, and crowned on 1 October, 965, as John XIII."
Otto I, Holy Roman Emperor	Benedict VI	January 19, 973 – June 974	Deposed and strangled by Crescentius the Elder "[...] the necessity of waiting for the ratification of the Emperor Otho delayed his consecration till 19 January, 973."
Otto II, Holy Roman Emperor	Benedict VII	October 974 – July 10, 983	Elected by the Roman clergy through the influence of Siccio, envoy of Otto II; Possibly related to Alberic II of Spoleto, the Count of Tusculum and the Crescentii
Otto II, Holy Roman Emperor	John XIV	December 983 – August 20, 984	"After the death of Benedict VII, Bishop Peter Campanora of Pavia, earlier imperial chancellor of Italy, was elected pope with the consent of Emperor Otto II [...]"
Unknown; existence is disputed	John XV	August 985 – March 996	John I Crescentius as Patricius Romanorum likely interfered in the succession of John XV, if, in fact, it occurred "John remained throughout his pontificate under the influence of the powerful patricius, though he maintained friendly relations with the German court and with both empresses-Adelaide, widow of Otto I, and Theophano, widow of Otto II."
Otto III, Holy Roman Emperor	Gregory V	996–999	Cousin of Otto III; Crescentius the Younger and the Roman clergy did not choose a successor to John XV immediately, but rather deferred to Otto III to select one.
Otto III, Holy Roman Emperor	Sylvester II	April 2, 999 – May 12, 1003	

== Crescentii ==
Crescentius the Elder, had previously deposed and had strangled Pope Benedict VI, and helped install Antipope Boniface VII in Rome in opposition to the imperial candidates, Pope Benedict VII and Pope John XIV, the latter of which perished in the Castel Sant'Angelo like Benedict V. John I Crescentius, the son of Crescentius the Elder, likely had a strong hand in the election of Pope John XV, although the details of that papacy are incomplete and disputed. However, it is known that his brother, Crescentius the Younger, deferred to Otto III, Holy Roman Emperor for the choice of the successor of John XV: Pope Gregory V, Otto III's cousin. Yet, not long afterward, disputes with the emperor and Gregory V caused Crescentius the Younger to support Antipope John XVI, who was deposed with some difficulty by Otto III, who proceeded to have John XVI mutilated and Crescentius the Younger killed.

Three years later, after a revolt in Rome involving John II Crescentius, the son of Crescentius the Younger, Otto III and Pope Sylvester II were expelled from Rome; the three successors of Sylvester II (who was later permitted to return to Rome) were appointed by John II Crescentius before he died in the spring of 1012, nearly simultaneously with Sergius IV, allowing the Counts of Tusculum to displace the Crescentii.

Appointer	Pope	Pontificate	Notes
John II Crescentius	John XVII	June 1003 – December 1003	Began in opposition to Gregory V
John II Crescentius	John XVIII	December 25, 1003 – July 1009	"He, too, owed his elevation to the influence of Crescentius."
John II Crescentius	Sergius IV	July 31, 1009 – May 12, 1012	

== Counts of Tusculum ==
Unlike the Tusculan popes during the "Pornocracy", Benedict VIII, John XIX, and Benedict IX were the Count of Tusculum themselves immediately prior to their becoming pope. Benedict VIII subjugated the Crescentii and made peace with the Holy Roman Empire, crowning Henry II, Holy Roman Emperor on February 14, 1014, nearly two years after his accession to the papacy.

"After the death of the last patricius of the House of Crescentius, the counts of Tusculum seized the authority in Rome, a scion of this family was raised to the papal throne as Benedict VIII, while his brother, Romanus, exercised the temporal power in the city as consul and senator. After Benedict's death Romanus, though a layman, was elected pope between 12 April and 10 May 1024, immediately after which he received all the orders in succession, took the name of John, and sought by lavish expenditure to win the Romans to his cause."

— J.P. Kirsch, 1913

Appointer	Pope	Pontificate	Notes
Counts of Tusculum	Benedict VIII	May 18, 1012 – April 9, 1024	Count of Tusculum immediately prior to becoming pope "[...] though a layman, imposed on the chair of Peter by force (18 May 1012)"
Counts of Tusculum	John XIX	April/May 1024 – October 20, 1032	Count of Tusculum immediately prior to becoming pope; brother of Benedict VIII
Counts of Tusculum	Benedict IX	1032–1044	Count of Tusculum immediately prior to becoming pope; nephew of his two immediate predecessors as the son of their brother, Alberic III, Count of Tusculum "Regarding it as a sort of heirloom, his father Alberic placed him upon [the Chair of Peter] when a mere youth, not, however, apparently of only twelve years of age [...]"; First term; abdicated twice for financial reward (cf. Pope Sylvester III and Pope Gregory VI)

== Holy Roman Empire ==
"In the autumn of 1046 the King of Germany, Henry III, crossed the Alps at the head of a large army and accompanied by a brilliant retinue of the secular and ecclesiastical princes of the empire, for the twofold purpose of receiving the imperial crown and of restoring order in the Italian Peninsula. The condition of Rome in particular was deplorable. In St. Peter's, the Lateran, and St. Mary Major's, sat three rival claimants to the papacy. [...] Two of them, Benedict IX and Sylvester III, represented rival factions of the Roman nobility [...] Gregory VI, was peculiar. [...] It was decided that he should summon a synod to meet at Sutri near Rome, at which the entire question should be ventilated. [...] Of the three papal claimants, Benedict refused to appear; he was again summoned and afterwards pronounced deposed at Rome. Sylvester was "stripped of his sacerdotal rank and shut up in a monastery". Gregory [...] deposed himself [...] the papal chair was declared vacant. As King Henry was not yet crowned emperor, he had no canonical right to take part in the new election; but the Romans had no candidate to propose and begged the monarch to suggest a worthy subject.

[...] Short-sighted reformers [...] who saw in this surrender of the freedom of papal elections to the arbitrary will of the emperor the opening of a new era, lived long enough to regret the mistake that was made."

— James F. Loughlin, 1913

Appointer	Pope	Pontificate	Notes
Henry III	Clement II	December 25, 1046 – October 9, 1047	Proceeded to crown Henry III; first "German Pope"
Henry III	Damasus II	July 17, 1048 – August 9, 1048	With the concurrence of Boniface III of Tuscany
Henry III	Leo IX	February 12, 1048 – April 19, 1054	Selected by the emperor at an assembly in Worms with the concurrence of Roman nobles, with the subsequent assent of the Roman clergy; Cousin of the emperor; brought Hildebrand (future Pope Gregory VII) to Rome with him.
Henry III	Victor II	April 13, 1055 – July 28, 1057	"After the death of Leo IX (19 April 1054) Cardinal-subdeacon Hildebrand came to the emperor at the head of a Roman legation with the urgent request to designate Gebhard as pope. At the Diet of Mainz, in September, 1054, the emperor granted this request, but Gebhard refused to accept the papal dignity. At a court Diet held at Ratisbon in March, 1055, he finally accepted the papacy, but only on condition that the emperor restored to the Apostolic See all the possessions that had been taken from it. The emperor consented to this condition and Gebhard accompanied Hildebrand to Rome, where he was formally elected and solemnly enthroned on Maundy Thursday [sic], 13 April 1055, taking the name of Victor II."
None	Stephen IX	August 2, 1057 – March 29, 1058	"He was made cardinal-priest of St. Chrysogonus by Victor II, and, on the latter's death, he was freely chosen his successor, and consecrated on the following day (3 August 1057)."
None	Nicholas II	December 6, 1058 – July 27, 1061	Promulgated In Nomine Domini (1059) "As soon as the news of the death of Stephen X at Florence reached Rome (4 April 1058). the Tusculan party appointed a successor in the person of John Mincius, Bishop of Velletri, under the name of Benedict X. His elevation, due to violence and corruption, was contrary to the specific orders of Stephen X that, at his death, no choice of a successor was to be made until Hildebrand's return from Germany. Several cardinals protested against the irregular proceedings, but they were compelled to flee from Rome. Hildebrand was returning from his mission when the news of these events reached him. He interrupted his journey at Florence, and after agreeing with Duke Godfrey of Lorraine-Tuscany upon Bishop Gerhard for elevation to the papacy, he won over part of the Roman population to the support of his candidate. An embassy dispatched to the imperial court secured the confirmation of the choice by the Empress Agnes. At Hildebrand's invitation, the cardinals met in December, 1058, at Siena and elected Gerhard who assumed the name of Nicholas II. On his way to Rome the new pope held at Sutri a well-attended synod at which, in the presence of Duke Godfrey and the imperial chancellor, Guibert of Parma, he pronounced deposition against Benedict X."
Burchard II, Bishop of Halberstadt*	Alexander II	September 30, 1061 – April 21, 1073	"Alexander's election was confirmed by an envoy"
Henry IV*	Gregory VII	April 22, 1073 – May 25, 1085	"Last pope whose election was confirmed by the Emperor"
Lothair III*	Innocent II	February 14, 1130 – September 24, 1143	"[...] the election of Innocent was ratified at a synod assembled at Würzburg at the request of the German king [...]"

== List of anti-papal appointments ==
Secular power	Antipope	Pontificate	Notes
Constantius	Felix II	355–358	Opposed to Pope Liberius
Exarchate of Ravenna	Theodore	687	"While Pope Conon lay dying, the archdeacon Pascal offered the exarch a large sum to bring about his election as his successor. Through the exarch's influence the archdeacon was accordingly elected by a number of people; about the same time another faction elected the archpriest Theodore. The mass of clergy and people, however, set them both aside and chose Sergius, who was duly consecrated."
Godfrey III, Duke of Lower Lorraine	Clement III	1080–1100	Bishop of Ravenna at the time Rome was captured from the Countess Matilda of Tuscany
Henry V, Holy Roman Emperor	Gregory VIII	March 10, 1118 – April 22, 1121	
Louis IV, Holy Roman Emperor	Nicholas V	May 12, 1328 – July 25, 1330	Opposed to Pope John XXII
