= Pope John numbering =

Contentious reginal numbers of popes named John

The numbering of popes named John does not occur in strict numerical order. Although there have been twenty-one legitimate popes named John, the numbering has reached XXIII because of two clerical errors that were introduced in the Middle Ages: first, antipope John XVI was kept in the numbering sequence instead of being removed; then, the number XX was skipped because Pope John XXI counted John XIV twice.

== List of Johns since the errors ==
Modern number	Dates of Papacy	Birth name	Notes	#
There is no controversy regarding the numbering of Popes John I through XIV. I • II • III • IV • V • VI • VII • VIII • IX • X • XI • XII • XIII
Pope John XIV	983–984	Pietro Canepanova		14
John XIVb or John XIV bis	Did not exist		Medieval historians misread the Liber Pontificalis to be referring to another "Pope John" between Pope John XIV and the true Pope John XV.	–
Pope John XV	985–996	Giovanni di Gallina Alba	Dual-numbered John XV (XVI) due to John XIV bis.	15
Antipope John XVI	997–998	Iōánnēs Philágathos (or Giovanni Filagato)	Dual-numbered John XVI (XVII). He was elected in opposition to Pope Gregory V (996–999) and is now considered to be an antipope, but his regnal number XVI was kept in the sequence.	–
Pope John XVII	1003	Giovanni Sicco	Dual-numbered John XVII (XVIII).	16
Pope John XVIII	1004–1009	Giovanni Fasano	Dual-numbered John XVIII (XIX).	17
Pope John XIX	1024–1032	Romano di Tuscolo	Dual-numbered John XIX (XX).	18
XX (skipped)	Did not exist		The number XX was skipped by John XXI.	–
Pope John XXI	1276–1277	Pedro Julião (or Petrus Hispanus)	Dual-numbered John XXI (XX). Pedro Julião selected the number XXI because he believed that "Popes John XV" through "XIX" should have been numbered "XVI" through "XX".	19
Pope John XXII	1316–1334	Jacques Duèze		20
Antipope John XXIII	1410–1415	Baldassare Cossa	Listed in the Annuario pontificio as a legitimate pope until the mid-20th century.	–
Pope John XXIII	1958–1963	Angelo Giuseppe Roncalli	Roncalli's choice of XXIII rather than XXIV confirmed the antipope status of Baldassare Cossa.	21

== John XX ==
The number XX was skipped due to confusion over John XIV (983–984), which resulted from an error in the textual transmission of his entry in the Liber Pontificalis. This entry originally specified not only the duration of his pontificate ("VIII mens." = eight months), but also the duration of his ensuing imprisonment by antipope Boniface VII, "per IV menses" ("for four months"). In the 11th century, some time after John XIX's pontificate, this entry on John XIV was misread to be referring to two different "Popes John", the first reigning for eight months who was directly succeeded by another John reigning for four months:

- Iohannes m. VIII ("John, eight months")
- Iohannes m. IV ("John, four months")

In distinguishing these two Johns, the second one came to be numbered "Iohannes XIV. bis" ("John XIV the second") and it was confused with a historic character, the cardinal deacon John son of Robert, who opposed Boniface VII after John XIV's death. Since John XV through XIX seemed to have neglected the existence of John XIV "bis", Pedro Julião "corrected" this "error" by taking the name John XXI.

Since these calculations were discovered in the 19th century, the popes are now listed using the numbers they used during their reigns. There is no real John XX. However, "Popes John XV" through "XIX" are dual-numbered "XVI" through "XX" because some sources had already used the altered numbering sequence. John XXI is also dual-numbered XX in older works.

== John XXIII ==
During the Western Schism, there were two claimants to the papacy. The Council of Pisa (1409) tried to end the schism by electing Alexander V as pope. However, neither the Avignon antipope nor the Roman pope was willing to abdicate, so there were now three papal claimants. The Pisan antipope Alexander V was succeeded by John XXIII, who abdicated in 1415 as part of a deal to end the schism.

Until the mid-20th century, the Annuario Pontificio regarded the Roman line as legitimate until 1409, followed by the Pisan line until 1415. The last three popes of the schism were listed as Gregory XII (1406–1409), Alexander V (1409–1410), and John XXIII (1410–1415). However, the Western Schism was reinterpreted when Pope John XXIII (1958–1963) chose to reuse the ordinal XXIII, citing "twenty-two [sic] Johns of indisputable legitimacy." This is reflected in modern editions of the Annuario Pontificio, which extend Gregory XII's reign to 1415. The Pisan popes Alexander V and John XXIII are now considered to be antipopes.

== See also ==
- List of popes § Numbering of popes

== Source ==
- Reginald L. Poole: "The Names and Numbers of Medieval Popes", in: The English Historical Review, Vol. 32, No. 128 (1917), pp. 465–478, see especially pp. 474–475
