= 974 =

Calendar year

974 in various calendars
Gregorian calendar	974; CMLXXIV
Ab urbe condita	1727
Armenian calendar	423; ԹՎ ՆԻԳ
Assyrian calendar	5724
Balinese saka calendar	895–896
Bengali calendar	380–381
Berber calendar	1924
Buddhist calendar	1518
Burmese calendar	336
Byzantine calendar	6482–6483
Chinese calendar	癸酉年 (Water Rooster); 3671 or 3464 — to — 甲戌年 (Wood Dog); 3672 or 3465
Coptic calendar	690–691
Discordian calendar	2140
Ethiopian calendar	966–967
Hebrew calendar	4734–4735
- Hindu calendars
Vikram Samvat	1030–1031
Shaka Samvat	895–896
Kali Yuga	4074–4075
Holocene calendar	10974
Iranian calendar	352–353
Islamic calendar	363–364
Japanese calendar	Ten'en 2 (天延２年)
Javanese calendar	875–876
Julian calendar	974; CMLXXIV
Korean calendar	3307
Minguo calendar	938 before ROC 民前938年
Nanakshahi calendar	−494
Seleucid era	1285/1286 AG
Thai solar calendar	1516–1517
Tibetan calendar	ཆུ་མོ་བྱ་ལོ་ (female Water-Bird); 1100 or 719 or −53 — to — ཤིང་ཕོ་ཁྱི་ལོ་ (male Wood-Dog); 1101 or 720 or −52

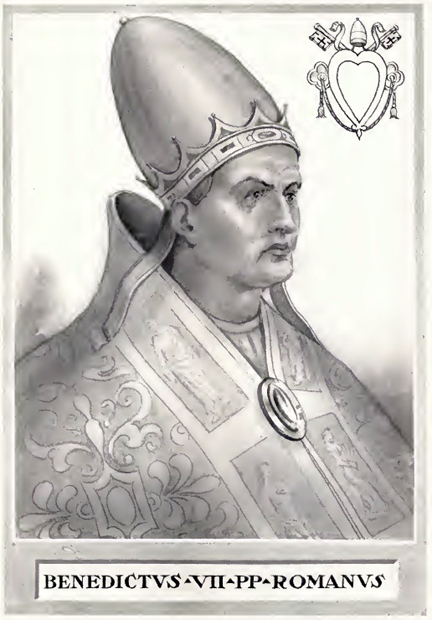
Pope Benedict VII (r. 974–983)

Year 974 (CMLXXIV) was a common year starting on Thursday of the Julian calendar.

== Events ==
=== By place ===
==== Europe ====
- Battle of Danevirke: Emperor Otto II defeats the rebel forces of King Harald I, who has invaded Nordalbingia (modern-day Holstein), to shake off imperial overlordship. Otto's armies swiftly subdue the Danes, consolidating the frontier between Scandinavia and Northern Germany. Meanwhile, Henry II begins a rebellion against his cousin Otto. He forges alliances with Bavarian and Saxon nobles.

==== England ====
- King Edgar I gives English help to Prince Hywel in ousting his uncle, King Iago of Gwynedd from his kingdom.
- A great earthquake occurs in England.

==== Abbasid Caliphate ====
- 5 August – Caliph al-Muti, ill and incapacitated, is deposed and succeeded by his son al-Ta'i, dying shortly after.

==== Africa ====
- The Qarmatians are defeated north of Cairo by Fatimid forces under General Jawhar al-Siqilli. He consolidates Fatimid rule and sends a legation to the Christian land of Nubia to secure the southern border of Egypt. Arab traders introduce Islam to the population, which gradually supplants Christianity.
- An offensive, by the Spain-based Caliphate of Córdoba brings the Maghrebi Idrisid Dynasty to an end. Caliph Al-Hakam II maintains the supremacy of the caliphate over the kingdoms of Navarra, Castile and León.

==== China ====
- The Liao Dynasty exchanges ambassadors with the Song Dynasty on New Years Day (Spring Festival).
- The city of Fuzhou, located in Fujian province, builds new city walls.

=== By topic ===
==== Religion ====
- Summer – Pope Benedict VI is imprisoned in the Castel Sant'Angelo at Rome, where he is strangled to death through the influence of the powerful Crescentii family. Crescentius I (the Elder), Italian politician and aristocrat, engineers an election and replaces Benedict with his own candidate Franco, who ascends under the title anti-Pope Boniface VII.
- Fall – Boniface VII is expelled by order of Otto II and flees to Constantinople, taking the Church treasury of the Vatican Basilica along with him. He is succeeded by Benedict VII as the 135th pope of the Catholic Church.
- An abbey is founded at the site of Mönchengladbach (Germany).

== Births ==
- Bruno of Querfurt, German missionary bishop (d. 1009)
- Ermengol I, count of Urgell (d. 1010)
- Frederick, count of Walbeck (d. 1018)
- Fujiwara no Korechika, Japanese nobleman (d. 1010)
- Lý Thái Tổ, emperor of Lý dynasty (d. 1028)

== Deaths ==
- March 7 – John of Gorze, Frankish abbot and diplomat
- October 12 – Al-Muti, caliph of the Abbasid Caliphate (b. 914)
- Al-Qadi al-Nu'man, Fatimid jurist and historian
- Benedict VI, pope of the Catholic Church
- Fujiwara no Yoshitaka, Japanese waka poet (b. 954)
- Muhammad Bal'ami, Persian historian and vizier
- Ratherius (or Rathier), bishop of Verona
- Shi Chonggui, emperor of Later Jin (b. 914)
