= Willigis =

Archbishop of Mainz

Saint Willigis
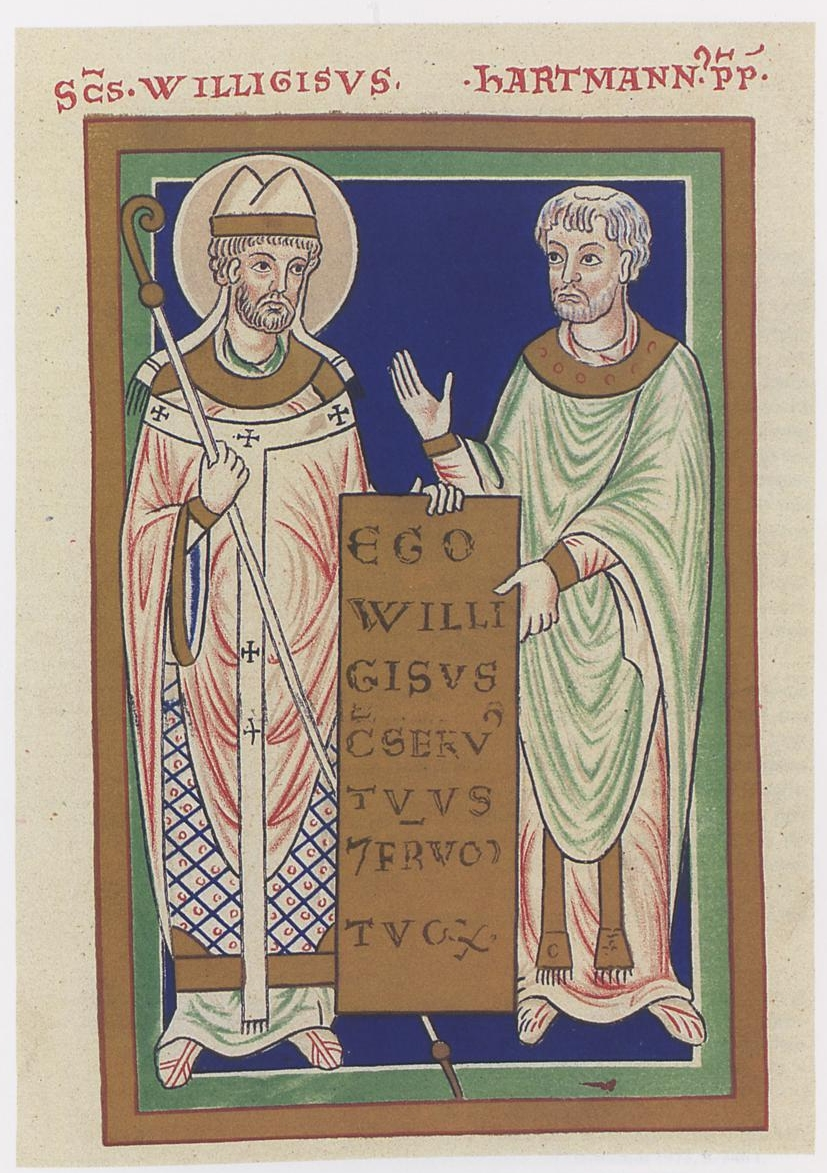
- Saint Willigis and Provost Hartmann, 12th century depiction, Russian State Library

Archbishop
- Born: c. 940; Schöningen, Saxony
- Died: February 23, 1011; Mainz, Rhenish Franconia
- Venerated in: Eastern Orthodox Church; Roman Catholic Church
- Feast: February 23
- Attributes: Wheel of Mainz
- Patronage: Wheelwrights

Willigis (Latin: Willigisus; German: Willigis, Willegis; c. 940 – 23 February 1011 AD) was Archbishop of Mainz from 975 until his death as well as archchancellor of the Holy Roman Empire.

== Life ==
Willigus was born in the Duchy of Saxony, possibly at Schöningen, the son of a free peasant. The able and intelligent young man received a good education, and was recommended by Bishop Volkold of Meissen to the service of Emperor Otto the Great. About 971, Willigis was appointed chancellor, an office formerly held by the emperor's brother Archbishop Bruno of Cologne. Until 973 he served Otto throughout the last years of his reign and at the height of his power.

In 975 Emperor Otto II made him Archbishop of Mainz and Archchancellor for Germany. Of humble origin, Willigis had to cope with many objections; he immediately had Pope Benedict VII confirm his supremacy as metropolitan bishop. Soon he started to build the great Cathedral of Mainz. Willigis demanded solid learning in his clergy too. He was known as a good and fluent speaker. In March 975 he received the pallium from Pope Benedict VII. In January 976 Willigis probably consecrated the first Bishop of Prague, Thietmar (Dětmar) at Brumath in Alsace, whose diocese was put under his jurisdiction.

At the 983 Reichstag of Verona, Otto II vested him with large territories in the Rheingau region, thereby laying the foundations for the Prince-Bishopric of Mainz. Upon the emperor's death, Willigis as Primas Germaniae, on Christmas 983 crowned his three-year-old son Otto III Rex Romanorum at Aachen. After the Dowager Empress Theophanu died in 991, Willigis became guardian of the minor, thus making him, together with Otto's grandmother, Adelaide of Italy, de facto regent of the Empire until Otto III came of age in 994.

In 996 he was in the retinue of the King on his journey to Italy. Together with Otto III he pushed the election of Pope Gregory V against the resistance of the Roman nobility led by Crescentius the Younger and was present at the consecration and at the synod convened a few days later. In this council Willigis strongly urged the return of Bishop Adalbert of Prague, who, unable to bear the conflicts with the Vršovci noble family and the ruling Přemyslid dynasty, had left his diocese for a second time, to which, after much correspondence between the Holy See and Willigis, he had once already been forced to return in 993. In 997 Pope Gregory V sent the decrees of a synod at Pavia to Willigis, "his vicar", for publication.

He was on friendly terms with Rome, though the papacy stood at its nadir. These relations were somewhat disturbed by the dispute of Willigis with Bishop Bernward of Hildesheim about jurisdiction in the house of secular canonesses at Gandersheim Abbey. The immediate monastery established in 852 was originally situated at Brunshausen in the Diocese of Hildesheim, but was transferred to nearby Gandersheim within the territorial limits of the Archdiocese of Mainz. Both bishops claimed jurisdiction, until Pope Sylvester II finally declared in favour of Hildesheim, against Willigis' initial resistance.

His protégé was the scholarly and just Burchard, who was appointed Bishop of Worms by Emperor Otto III in 1000. Upon the Emperor's early death, Archbishop Willigis on 7 June 1002 crowned the Duke of Bavaria Henry IV as King of the Romans at Mainz, after the assassination of his rival Margrave Eckard I of Meissen. Willigis presided at the 1007 synod at Frankfurt am Main, where thirty-five bishops signed the bull of Pope John XVIII for the erection of the Diocese of Bamberg.

Though Willigis has never been canonized, Roman Catholics celebrate his feast on 23 February, the day of his death in 1011. It has also been alternatively given as 18 April.

== Builder ==
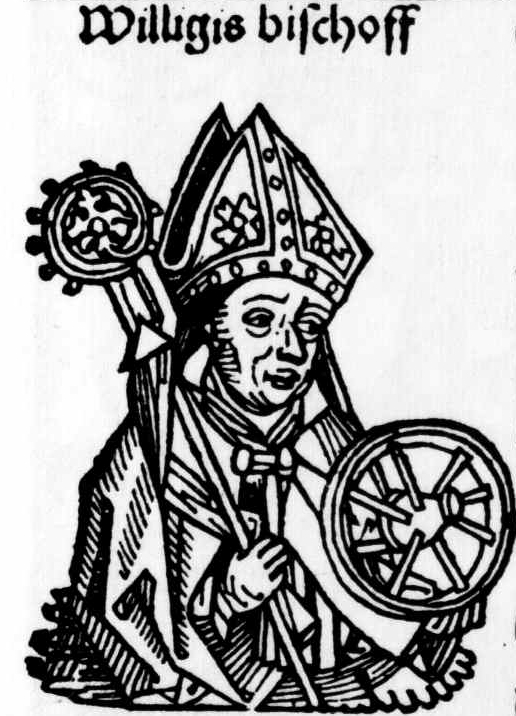
Bishop Willigis with Mainz Wheel, Nuremberg Chronicle, 1493

In his diocese he laboured by building bridges, constructing roads, and fostering commerce. In Mainz he initiated the construction of the cathedral and consecrated it on 29 August 1009, dedicating it in honor of St. Martin of Tours, but on the same day, disastrously, it was destroyed by fire. Willigis immediately gave orders for reconstruction.

Willigis greatly helped the restoration of the old collegiate church of St. Victor and built that of St. Stephan. He also built churches at Brunnen in Nassau and Seesbach. He showed great solicitude for the religious, and substantially aided the monasteries of St. Ferrutius at Bleidenstadt, of Disibodenberg, and of Jechaburg in Thuringia. Because the cathedral had not yet been rebuilt, he was buried in the Church of St Stephan.

== Works ==
- Officium et miracula Sancti Willigisi, ed. V. I. Guerrier (J. Deubner, 1869)

== See also ==
- Wheel of Mainz

== Notes ==
Catholic Church titles
Preceded by Ruprecht	Archbishop of Mainz; 975–1011	Succeeded by Erkanbald
