= Crescentius the Elder =

Italian noble and aristocrat (920–984)

Crescentius I

Ruler of Rome
- Reign: June 974 – October 974
- Successor: None; Imperial rule (John I Crescentius in 985)
- Born: c. 925; Papal States
- Died: 7 July 984 (aged c. 59); Rome, Papal States
- Burial: Basilica of Saints Boniface and Alexius
- Spouse: Sergia
- Issue more...: John I; Crescentius II the Younger
- House: Crescentii
- Father: John
- Mother: Theodora II

Crescentius I (Italian: Crescenzio I, c. 925 – 7 July 984), known as Crescentius the Elder or by his matronymic de Theodora, was a Roman aristocrat and a prominent figure in the political affairs of Rome during the late 10th century. A member of the Crescentii family, he was descended from the powerful Theophylacti family, which dominated Roman politics during the first half of the century. Crescentius rose to prominence during the political crisis following the death of Pope John XIII (r. 965–972) and led the aristocratic revolt that resulted in the deposition of Pope Benedict VI (r. 973–974) and his replacement by Antipope Boniface VII. His sons, John I Crescentius and Crescentius II the Younger, later became leading figures in Roman politics.

== Biography ==
=== Early life and family ===
Crescentius I was probably born in Latium during the first half of the 10th century. According to his funerary inscription, preserved in the cloister of the Basilica of Saints Boniface and Alexius on the Aventine Hill, he was the son of John and Theodora. The identity of his parents has been the subject of considerable historiographical debate. The hypothesis that his mother was Theodora II, daughter of senator Theophylact I and sister of Marozia I, has received support from several historians, including Giuseppe Bossi, Hans Kölmel, Louis Duchesne and Pierre Toubert, although other scholars, such as Otto Gerstenberg and Paolo Brezzi, have expressed reservations.

Arms of the House of Crescentii

His father John was probably a relatively obscure member of the Crescentii family, possibly a brother of Crescentius of the Marble Horse, a prominent Roman nobleman who is sometimes confused with Crescentius I in later accounts. If the identification of his mother as Theodora II is correct, Crescentius I would have been a brother of Marozia II, the mother of Gregory I of Tusculum; Theodora III, who married John III, Duke of Naples; and Stephania, the second wife of Benedict, comes et rector (Count and Rector) of Sabina and a nephew of Pope John XIII (r. 965–972). All three women are attested with the title senatrix.

=== Revolt against Benedict VI ===
Crescentius became prominent during the political crisis following the death of Pope John XIII in 972. After his death, Crescentius supported the election of the deacon Franco di Ferruccio, but the imperial court rejected the choice and supported Benedict VI (r. 973–974), whose election was strongly backed by Holy Roman Emperor Otto I (r. 962–973). Benedict's lack of support among the Roman aristocracy, combined with Otto I's death in May 973 and the resulting preoccupation of his successor Otto II (r. 973–983) with political difficulties in Germany, weakened imperial authority in Rome.

Crescentius took advantage of this situation and, in June 974, led an aristocratic revolt against Benedict VI. The pope was deposed and imprisoned in Castel Sant'Angelo, known at the time as the domus Theodorici, which was under the control of the Crescentian faction. The exact nature of the accusations against Benedict VI is unknown, although his imposition without the agreement of the Roman aristocracy may have contributed to his deposition. Following his imprisonment, Franco di Ferruccio was elevated to the papacy as Boniface VII. His relationship with Crescentius remains uncertain: Boniface VII may have been closely associated with Crescentius and his faction, but the sources do not establish whether he was himself a member of the Crescentian party or represented a separate aristocratic or curial group whose interests temporarily coincided with theirs.

Otto II responded by sending Count Sicco to Rome to restore Benedict VI. The insurgents refused to release the imprisoned pope, and Boniface VII, fearing that an imperial intervention would restore Benedict, had him strangled by a priest named Stephen. Some later sources attributed the execution directly to Crescentius, referring to him under the names Cinthius or Cincio. The killing nevertheless severely weakened Boniface VII's position. Sicco entered Rome and besieged him in Castel Sant'Angelo, while the Crescentian faction appears to have withdrawn its support. Boniface VII eventually fled Rome, taking part of the papal treasury with him, and sought refuge in Constantinople. Crescentius reached a compromise with Sicco, who, together with the Romans, supported the election of Benedict VII (r. 974–983) in October 974.

=== Later life and death ===
Following the restoration of peace in Rome, Crescentius continued to administer his possessions and maintained favourable relations with Benedict VII. In a document dated to 977, preserved in a much later copy, he concluded an agreement with John, abbot of the Abbey of Saint Andrew in Silice near Velletri. The abbot granted Crescentius and his descendants the fief of Le Castella for three generations. In return, Crescentius undertook, in addition to the customary obligations, to fight at the command of the Pope and the abbot. The document has been regarded by some historians as one of the earliest examples of feudal concession relating to Latium. Crescentius then took religious vows in the Basilica of Saints Boniface and Alexius on the Aventine Hill, where he died on 7 July 984.

== Marriage and children ==
Crescentius I married Sergia, with whom he had several children. His known children were:

- John I Crescentius, who ruled Rome as patrician from 985 to c. 990.
- Crescentius II the Younger, who ruled Rome as senator from c. 990 to 998.

== See also ==
- Crescentii
- Pope Benedict VI

== Sources ==
- Longo, Umberto (2002). "Dizionario Biografico degli Italiani - Volume 59 - Gregorio di Tuscolo". Treccani.
- Romeo #1, Carlo (1984). "Dizionario Biografico degli Italiani - Volume 30 - Crescenzio Nomentano". Treccani.
- Pauler, Roland (2001). "Dizionario Biografico degli Italiani - Volume 55 - GIOVANNI XIII, papa". Treccani.
- Comyn, Robert (1851). The History of the Western Empire: From its Restoration by Charlemagne to the Accession of Charles V. London: William H. Allen & Co – via Internet Archive.
- West-Harling, Veronica (2025). "The visibility of women in tenth-century Rome". Wiley Online Library.
- Romeo #2, Carlo (1984). "Dizionario Biografico degli Italiani - Volume 30 - CRESCENZIO". Treccani.
- Romeo #3, Carlo (1984). "Dizionario Biografico degli Italiani - Volume 30 - CRESCENZIO de Theodora". Treccani.
- Delogu, Paolo (1971). "Dizionario Biografico degli Italiani - Volume 12 - BONIFACIO VII, papa". Treccani.
- Delogu, Paolo (1966). "Dizionario Biografico degli Italiani - Volume 8 - BENEDETTO VII, papa". Treccani.
