= John II Crescentius =

Patrician and Ruler of Rome from 1002 to 1012

John II
- Patricius romanorum

Ruler of Rome
- Reign: 1002 – Before 18 May 1012
- Predecessor: Gregory I of Tusculum
- Born: c. 975; Papal States
- Died: Before 18 May 1012 (aged c. 37); Papal States
- House: Crescentii
- Father: Crescentius II the Younger
- Mother: Theodora

John II Crescentius (Note: Also erroneously referred to as Crescentius III.) (Italian: Giovanni II di Crescenzio, c. 975 – Before 18 May 1012) was a Roman aristocrat who served as patrician and was the dominant political figure in Rome from 1002 until his death. A member of the Crescentii family, he was the son of Crescentius II the Younger, who was executed by Emperor Otto III in 998.

Following a brief revolt led by Gregory I of Tusculum, which forced Otto III to flee Rome, John became the leading political figure in Rome. During his rule, the family regained its dominant position in the city, while maintaining influence over the papacy and extensive territorial interests in the surrounding region. John's death in 1012 coincided with the end of Crescentii dominance in Rome. The election of Benedict VIII (r. 1012–1024), a member of the rival Counts of Tusculum, with the support of Emperor Henry II, marked the beginning of the Tusculan ascendancy in Roman politics.

== Biography ==
=== Early life and family ===
John II Crescentius was presumably born in Latium around 975. He was the son of Crescentius II the Younger, a leading Roman aristocrat who opposed Emperor Otto III (r. 996–1002) and was executed in 998, and his wife Theodora. He belonged to the Crescentii family, one of the most powerful aristocratic dynasties in Rome during the late 10th and early 11th centuries. John's father had succeeded his brother, John I Crescentius, as the leading political figure in Rome. John I had served as patrician and exercised political authority in the city before his death in the early 990s, while Crescentius II subsequently held the title of senator and obtained the county of Terracina.

Arms of the House of Crescentii

John was still a young man when his father was killed during Otto III's siege of Castel Sant'Angelo in April 998. Although Crescentius's death temporarily weakened the family's position in Rome, the Crescentii soon regained political prominence. In 1001, the Romans, led by Gregory I of Tusculum, revolted against Otto III, forcing the emperor and Pope Sylvester II (r. 999–1003) to flee the city. Otto III died in January 1002, leaving the Crescentii in a position to reassert their control over Rome.

=== Ruler of Rome ===
Following the emperor's death, John emerged as the head of the Crescentii and became the dominant political figure in Rome. He is traditionally considered to have assumed the title of patrician in 1002, although the first surviving record explicitly describing him as patrician dates from October 1006. Some historians have therefore proposed that he began governing Rome in 1002 but assumed the title only several years later. The evidence for an earlier date includes a reference by Abbot Hugh of Farfa connecting his rise with the death of Otto III and a report by Thietmar of Merseburg that John sent valuable gifts to King Henry II, probably on the occasion of Henry's coronation at Pavia in 1004.

John's rule represented a continuation of the aristocratic system that had dominated Rome since the 10th century, in which the authority of the Roman aristocracy remained closely connected with the papacy, while the position of the Holy Roman Emperor in Rome was temporarily weakened. John's rule coincided with the pontificate of Pope John XVII (r. 1003), followed by those of John XVIII (r. 1004–1009) and Sergius IV (r. 1009–1012). His patriciate was also the last major manifestation of this system in Rome. Unlike his predecessors, John was therefore able to exercise his authority without the direct presence of imperial forces, and his government was not disrupted by major revolts. Thietmar of Merseburg records that John sent Henry valuable gifts, including miraculous oil said to have flowed from the floor of a Roman church. According to Thietmar, however, John subsequently sought to prevent Henry from becoming emperor. John may have formally recognized Henry's authority while attempting to keep him away from Rome, although the evidence for wider diplomatic initiatives involving Bolesław I of Poland and Arduin of Ivrea is uncertain.

John's influence extended beyond the papal succession. Following the death of Pope Sylvester II (r. 999–1003) in May 1003, John XVII was elected pope, probably with the support of John II. He died only a few months later, on 6 November 1003, and was succeeded by John XVIII, whose election in December was likewise probably secured through the influence of the Crescentii. John XVIII initially appears to have acted in concert with John II, but his attempts to establish closer relations with King Henry II brought him into conflict with the Crescentii, who were hostile to the German ruler. According to Thietmar of Merseburg, John XVIII invited Henry II to Rome in 1004 to be crowned emperor but withdrew the invitation because of John II's opposition. When John XVIII died in 1009, Sergius IV was elected pope, probably again through the influence of John II. Sergius continued the policy of seeking closer relations with Henry II, notably by confirming privileges granted to Merseburg and sending a papal mission to Germany in 1012. Despite these developments, the Crescentii retained considerable influence over the papacy throughout John's rule. Their position was increasingly challenged by the rival Counts of Tusculum, with whom they were related. The rivalry between the two aristocratic dynasties would culminate shortly after John's death.

John's position was further strengthened by the support of his relatives, including the Crescentii Stefaniani of Sabina, John and Crescentius, whom he protected as close kinsmen. According to Hugh of Farfa, he regarded the brothers John and Crescentius as dilectos consanguineos (beloved blood relatives). Under his protection, they continued to exercise authority in the Sabina and to dispute territorial rights with the Abbey of Farfa. Crescentius resumed the office of comes et rector (Count and Rector) of the Sabina in 1004, while his brother John acquired Palestrina. In 1006, however, the Stefaniani were replaced in the administration of the Sabina by members of the Ottaviani branch, who were more closely connected to John II through the marriage of his sister, Rogata, to a nobleman named Octavian.

John died childless before 18 May 1012, shortly after the death of Sergius IV. His death brought an end to the period of Crescentii dominance in Rome, as well as to the family's main branch. The Roman political situation subsequently changed rapidly: the Tusculan Theophylact II was elected pope as Benedict VIII (r. 1012–1024) with the support of Emperor Henry II, and the Counts of Tusculum seized control of Rome. The Crescentii consequently lost their dominant position in the city, while their remaining territorial branches were progressively attacked and dispossessed.

== See also ==
- Crescentii

== Sources ==
- Longo, Umberto (2002). "Dizionario Biografico degli Italiani - Volume 59 - Gregorio di Tuscolo". Treccani.
- Romeo #1, Carlo (1984). "Dizionario Biografico degli Italiani - Volume 30 - Crescenzio Nomentano". Treccani.
- Pauler, Roland (2001). "Dizionario Biografico degli Italiani - Volume 55 - GIOVANNI XIII, papa". Treccani.
- Lupis, Marco (2005). "Origine della dinastia Colonna: i Tuscolani". Enciclopedia genealogica del Mediterraneo.
- Comyn, Robert (1851). The History of the Western Empire: From its Restoration by Charlemagne to the Accession of Charles V. London: William H. Allen & Co – via Internet Archive.
- West-Harling, Veronica (2025). "The visibility of women in tenth-century Rome". Wiley Online Library.
- Romeo #2, Carlo (1984). "Dizionario Biografico degli Italiani - Volume 30 - CRESCENZIO". Treccani.
- Tellenbach, Gerd (1966). "Dizionario Biografico degli Italiani - Volume 8 - Bendetto VIII". Treccani.
- Sennis #1, Antonio (2001). "Dizionario Biografico degli Italiani - Volume 55 - Giovanni XVII". Treccani.
- Sennis #2, Antonio (2001). "Dizionario Biografico degli Italiani - Volume 55 - Giovanni XVIII". Treccani.
- Sennis #3, Antonio (2001). "Dizionario Biografico degli Italiani - Volume 55 - Sergio IV". Treccani.
- Di Carpegna Falconieri, Tommaso (2001). "Dizionario Biografico degli Italiani - Volume 56 - Giovanni di Crescenzio". Treccani.
