= Siccone =

Siccone may refer to:

- Pope John XVII (died 1003)
- Bishop of Ostia (960-963)
