= John Crescentius =

John Crescentius may refer to:

- John I Crescentius (died c. 990), Patrician and ruler of Rome from 984 to 990;
- John II Crescentius (died 1012), Patrician and ruler of Rome from 1002 to 1012.
- Pope John XIII, sometimes incorrectly identified as having been born with the name John Crescentius.
