= Crescentius the Younger =

Senator and ruler of Rome from 990 to 998

Crescentius II
- Omnium romanorum senator

Ruler of Rome
- Reign: c. 990 – 28 April 998
- Predecessor: John I Crescentius
- Successor: None; Imperial rule (Gregory I of Tusculum in 1001)
- Born: c. 950; Papal States
- Died: 28 April 998 (aged c. 48); Rome, Papal States
- Burial: San Pancrazio
- Spouse: Theodora
- Issue more...: John II; Rogata
- House: Crescentii
- Father: Crescentius I the Elder
- Mother: Sergia

Crescentius II (Italian: Crescenzio II, c. 950 – 28 April 998), known as Crescentius the Younger or Nomentano (Note: Chronicler Bonizo of Sutri gave him the epithet "Nomentano" (of Mentana) by which Crescentius subsequently became known in Italian sources.), was a Roman aristocrat and senator who became the dominant political figure in Rome in the late 10th century. A member of the Crescentii Family and son of Crescentius I the Elder, he was granted the county of Terracina by Pope John XV (r. 985–996). Following the death of his elder brother John I Crescentius, he abandoned his interests in Terracina and returned to Rome, where he assumed control of the city and became its leading political authority.

Crescentius initially maintained relations with Pope John XV, but later became increasingly opposed to the papacy and the growing influence of the Ottonian dynasty in Rome. After John XV's death, he supported the election of Pope Gregory V but rebelled against him later in 996, forcing the pope to flee Rome. He subsequently supported the election of Antipope John XVI, but was defeated after Holy Roman Emperor Otto III (r. 996–1002) returned to Italy and besieged Castel Sant'Angelo. Crescentius was executed by the imperial forces on 28 April 998 after the fall of Castel Sant'Angelo.

== Biography ==
=== Early life and family ===
Crescentius II was presumably born in Latium around 950. He was the son of Crescentius I the Elder, who had led the revolt against Pope Benedict VI (r. 973–974) in June 974, and his wife Sergia. Although Crescentius II was a leading figure in the history of Rome during the late 10th century, his career became surrounded by legends and misunderstandings that caused considerable confusion among later historians. A passage in the chronicle of John the Deacon also led to confusion between Crescentius and his elder brother John I Crescentius. Several historians, including Ferdinand Gregorovius, incorrectly treated the two brothers as a single person. John I Crescentius was an important political figure in late 10th century Rome who became leader of the Crescentii family after Crescentius I retired from political life. He had supported the election of Pope John XV (r. 985–996) and subsequently served as patrician and ruler of Rome. The distinction between the brothers is made explicit in the Cronica Sancti Bartholomei in Insula, which describes Crescentius II as "Crescentio eiusdem patrici germano" (Crescentius, brother of the same patrician). The two brothers are also recorded together in a document dated to October 989, which names their parents, both of whom were already dead.

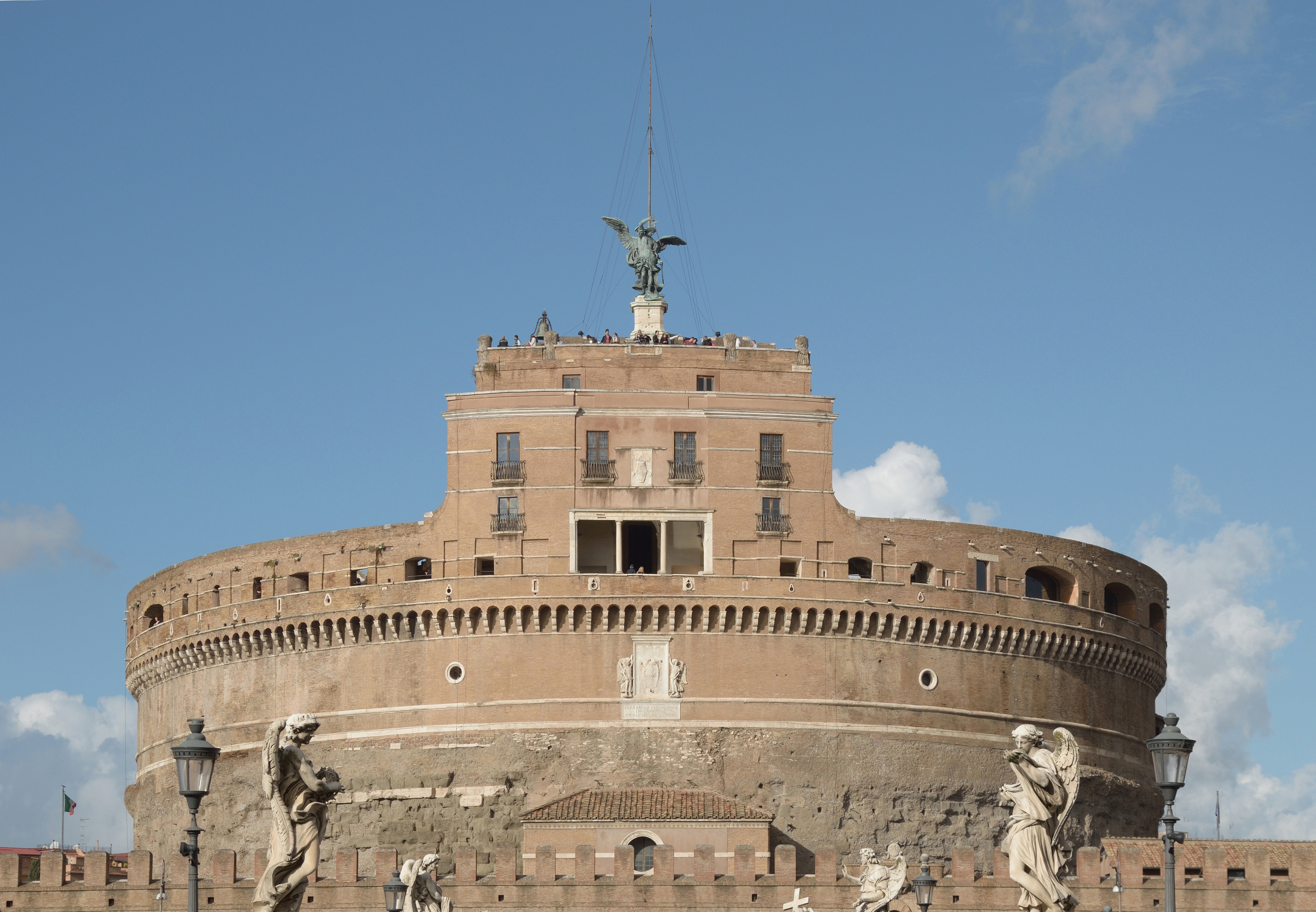
Castel Sant'Angelo, stronghold of the Crescentii in Rome.

During the first years of John XV's pontificate, while his brother held the patriciate, Crescentius was made a senator and received the county of Terracina from the pope. A donation dated 7 January 991 records that the territory had been granted to him by John XV. A document of 988 likewise describes him as "omnium romanorum senator atque gloriosus comes" (senator of all the Romans and glorious count). Between 985 and 990, Crescentius II was therefore already senator and a powerful territorial lord.

=== Ruler of Rome ===
On 15 June 991, Theophanu, widow of Emperor Otto II and mother of the young Otto III, died. The political stability that had surrounded Theophanu and her son subsequently began to weaken. Her relations with the Romans had been generally good, and she had supported the election of John XV. During her residence in Rome from 989 to 990, the citizens had also sworn obedience to her. Around the same time, Crescentius II's brother John appears to have died, although the chroniclers did not record his death, contributing to the later confusion between the two brothers. Crescentius succeeded him as the leading political figure in Rome. He abandoned his interests in Terracina, returned to Rome, and firmly took control of the city, retaining the title of senator. His government became increasingly assertive, perhaps also as a consequence of the political situation created in Germany by Theophanu's death.

By the beginning of 995, Crescentius had become an opponent of John XV. At a council held at Reims, the local bishops described Crescentius as a diaboli membrum ("member of the devil"), a phrase attributed to Gerbert of Aurillac, the future Pope Sylvester II (r. 999–1003). The bishops also complained to Leo II, the archbishop of Ravenna and papal legate, that their representatives had not even been received in Rome by Crescentius, possibly because, according to their account, the required tribute had not been paid to him. Relations between Crescentius and John XV subsequently broke down completely. According to the Cronica Sancti Bartholomei in Insula, the pope suffered "many persecutions" from Crescentius and either left or was forced to leave Rome. He took refuge at Sutri, from where he appealed to Otto III, who reached adulthood that year. The emperor prepared to cross the Alps and march on Rome, but Crescentius, having learned of his plans, quickly reconciled with the pope. John XV died in April 996. Otto learned of his death at Ravenna from envoys sent by Crescentius, who invited the emperor to enter Rome and make his intentions concerning the papal succession known. Otto selected his young cousin Bruno of Carinthia, son of the Duke of Carinthia and Margrave of Verona, on the advice of Archbishop Willigis of Mainz. Bruno was escorted to Rome, where he received a favorable reception from the citizens, and was formally crowned pope as Gregory V (r. 996–999) on 3 May 996. A few days later, Otto arrived in Rome and, on 21 May, received the imperial crown from Gregory V in a solemn ceremony. On 26 May, Otto III and Gregory V held a synod at St Peter's Basilica in the presence of the imperial court and numerous bishops. The conduct of Crescentius toward the deceased John XV was examined, and Crescentius was sentenced to exile. Gregory V's intercession, however, secured a pardon and the sentence was remitted.

=== Fall from power ===
Otto III subsequently returned to Germany, removing one of the principal sources of support for Gregory V. On 29 September 996 however Crescentius led a revolt in Rome that forced the pope to flee to Pavia. There, at the beginning of 997, Gregory V convened a synod and excommunicated Crescentius. Crescentius anticipated that Otto would eventually intervene and sent his son John II Crescentius to Constantinople to seek the support of the Byzantine emperor Basil II. John was received with considerable honors, but Basil II was then preoccupied with his war against the Bulgarians. Byzantine neutrality was nevertheless important to Crescentius, who needed political and military support and access to Byzantine financial resources, as well as to Otto III, for whom Byzantine neutrality reduced the danger of a direct conflict. In May 997, Crescentius chose John, Bishop of Piacenza, who became Antipope John XVI (r. 997–998) against Gregory V. John XVI had previously enjoyed the favor of Theophanu and had been sent to Constantinople to negotiate Otto's marriage to princess Zoe Porphyrogenita. After the negotiations failed, he returned from Constantinople and stopped in Rome, where Crescentius had him installed as antipope.

Engarving by Vinzenz Katzler depicting the execution of Crescentius, 1868

At the end of 997, Otto III crossed the Alps and celebrated Christmas in Pavia with Gregory V before proceeding to Rome. He reached the city in February 998, but Crescentius and his supporters had withdrawn into Castel Sant'Angelo, known at the time as the domus Theodorici. John XVI had fled the city. Crescentius may still have hoped for Byzantine intervention, although it was unlikely to materialize. John XVI was captured near Torre Astura while attempting to escape by sea toward Constantinople. He was blinded and mutilated, with his tongue, nose and ears cut off, before being paraded through Rome and imprisoned. Meanwhile, Otto's forces besieged Castel Sant'Angelo, where Crescentius and his supporters continued to resist repeated assaults. After almost two months of siege, at dawn on Easter Sunday in 998, Eckard I of Meissen launched an assault on the fortress using large siege engines. According to Thietmar of Merseburg, the fortress fell after a final resistance that lasted eight days, on 28 April 998. Crescentius was beheaded on the battlements and, on Otto's orders, his body was hanged.

Crescentius's death left a deep impression on contemporary and later memories of Rome. According to Ademar of Chabannes, whose account was not written from the Crescentian perspective, Crescentius's death was followed by "great mourning". His defeat, however, did not end Roman resistance to imperial authority. In 1001, the Romans, led by his cousin Gregory I of Tusculum, revolted again and expelled Otto III from the city; the emperor died the following year. Crescentius's son John II Crescentius subsequently became patrician and ruler of Rome, continuing the family's political presence in the city.

== Marriage and children ==
Crescentius II married Theodora, with whom he had several children. His known children were:

- John II Crescentius, who became patrician and ruler of Rome from 1002 to 1012.
- Rogata, who married Octavian, Count of Sabina; Their son Crescentius became the founder of the Crescentii Ottaviani, a cognatic cadet branch.

== Legacy ==
The dramatic circumstances of Crescentius II's death gave rise to numerous later legends and conflicting accounts. Rodulfus Glaber claimed that Crescentius himself had left the fortress at night to ask for mercy and had been forced back inside by Otto's men. Ademar of Chabannes claimed that his wife had betrayed him, while Peter Damian attributed the betrayal to a man named Tamno, who had allegedly broken an oath given on Otto's behalf to spare the lives of the besieged in exchange for their surrender. The location where Crescentius's body was suspended is likewise uncertain. The sources disagree between Castel Sant'Angelo and Monte Mario, with the latter location favored by later tradition. Monte Mario, immediately behind the Vatican Hill, was known as mons Gaudius because it marked the end of the Via Francigena and offered pilgrims their first view of Rome. Wherever the body was displayed, its position allowed it to be seen from much of Rome and served as an example and warning to the city's inhabitants.

According to Caesar Baronius, Crescentius was subsequently buried in secret in the church of San Pancrazio on the Via Aurelia. The choice of the church may have contributed to the later association of his death with betrayal, as the church had traditionally been associated with victims of betrayal and perjury since the time of Gregory of Tours. An inscription in the basilica of San Pancrazio commemorates Crescentius with the words qui tenuit totam feliciter ordine Romam ("who happily held all Rome in order"). The inscription describes him as handsome and of noble origin, and contrasts the fortunate course of his life with his terrible death. The verses were copied by Baronius, who reported reading them on the church floor, and were later reproduced by Ferdinand Gregorovius. They probably date from the approximately ten-year period during which John II Crescentius ruled Rome as patrician, when the family once again held political control of the city.

== See also ==
- Crescentii
- Antipope John XVI

== Sources ==
- Longo, Umberto (2002). "Dizionario Biografico degli Italiani - Volume 59 - Gregorio di Tuscolo". Treccani.
- Romeo #1, Carlo (1984). "Dizionario Biografico degli Italiani - Volume 30 - Crescenzio Nomentano". Treccani.
- Pauler, Roland (2001). "Dizionario Biografico degli Italiani - Volume 55 - GIOVANNI XIII, papa". Treccani.
- Lupis, Marco (2005). "Origine della dinastia Colonna: i Tuscolani". Enciclopedia genealogica del Mediterraneo.
- Comyn, Robert (1851). The History of the Western Empire: From its Restoration by Charlemagne to the Accession of Charles V. London: William H. Allen & Co – via Internet Archive.
- West-Harling, Veronica (2025). "The visibility of women in tenth-century Rome". Wiley Online Library.
- Romeo #2, Carlo (1984). "Dizionario Biografico degli Italiani - Volume 30 - CRESCENZIO". Treccani.
- Romeo #3, Carlo (1984). "Dizionario Biografico degli Italiani - Volume 30 - CRESCENZIO de Theodora". Treccani.
- Canetti, Luigi (2001). "Dizionario Biografico degli Italiani - Volume 55 - GIOVANNI XVI, Antipapa". Treccani.
- Borghese, Gianluca (2005). "Leone". Dizionario Biografico degli Italiani (in Italian). Vol. 64: Latilla–Levi Montalcini. Rome: Institute of the Italian Encyclopaedia. ISBN 978-88-12-00032-6.
- Duckett, Eleanor Shipley (1967). Death and Life in the Tenth Century. Ann Arbor: University of Michigan Press – via Internet Archive.
- Huschner, Wolfgang (2001). "Dizionario Biografico degli Italiani - Volume 55 - GIOVANNI XV, papa". Treccani.
- Di Carpegna Falconieri, Tommaso (2001). "Dizionario Biografico degli Italiani - Volume 56 - Giovanni di Crescenzio". Treccani.
