= Antipope John XVI =

Priest, chaplain, bishop and antipope (c.945-c.1001)

John XVI
- Antipope
- Fresco of John Philagathos as the chaplain of Theophanu, c. 972 (Abbazia di San Michele Arcangelo, Schifanoia)
- Papacy began: 997
- Papacy ended: 998
- Predecessor: Boniface VII
- Successor: Gregory VI

Personal details
- Born: Ioannis Philagathos c. 945 Rossano, Calabria, Italy
- Died: c. 1001 Rome, Italy
- Denomination: Pre-East-West Schism

John XVI (c. 945 – c. 1001; born Greek: Ιωάννης Φιλάγαθος, Ioannis Philagathos; Italian: Giovanni Filagato; Latin: Johannes Philagathus) was an antipope from 997 to 998.

== Biography ==
John was of Greek descent and was a native of Rossano in Calabria, southern Italy. The region was at the time a territory of the Byzantine Empire, while John was the chaplain of the Greek-born Empress Theophanu, wife of Holy Roman Emperor Otto II. Twice he acted as Imperial chancellor in Italy for Otto, in 980–982, whereupon he was appointed Abbot of Nonantola. He was the godfather of the imperial couple's son, the future Emperor Otto III. He was his tutor when he was seven (987). By the Empress's persuasion, John was appointed Bishop of Piacenza, and he was sent to Constantinople to accompany home a Byzantine princess for the younger Otto. After Otto II's death, the youthful Otto III came to the aid of Pope John XV in 996, to put down the rebellion of a faction led by the rich and powerful Roman nobleman Crescentius the Younger. Otto III stopped to be acclaimed King of Lombardy at Pavia, and failed to reach Rome before the Pope died. Once in Rome, Otto III engineered the election of his cousin Bruno of Carinthia as Pope Gregory V, and the new pontiff then crowned Otto III emperor on 21 May 996.

Once Otto III had returned to Germany, the faction headed by Crescentius II violently unseated Gregory V and, with the active support of the Byzantine Emperor Basil II, acclaimed John as Pope John XVI. A synod of the Western bishops held in 997 at the Imperial capital in Italy, Pavia, made no mention of John, but excommunicated Crescentius the Younger.

Otto III firmly put down Crescentius II's uprising in February 998 after advancing once more into Rome. John XVI fled, but the Emperor's troops pursued and captured him, cut off his nose and ears, cut out his tongue, broke his fingers and blinded him, that he might not write, and publicly degraded him before Otto III and Gregory V by being forced to ride through the streets of Rome seated backwards on a donkey. At the intercession of Saint Nilus the Younger, one of his countrymen, his life was spared: he was sent to the monastery of Fulda, in Germany, where he died about 1001.

John's consent to be enthroned as pope against the claims of Gregory can be seen as a manipulation of the constant political struggles by the Roman nobles against Frankish power, accruing to the advantage of Byzantine influence against the widening of Frankish power in Rome, where Gregory was the first German pontiff.

== See also ==
- Papal selection before 1059
