= Pope Sergius IV =

Head of the Catholic Church from 1009 to 1012

- Bishop of Rome
- Church: Catholic Church
- Papacy began: 31 July 1009
- Papacy ended: 12 May 1012
- Predecessor: John XVIII
- Successor: Benedict VIII
- Previous post: Cardinal-Bishop of Albano (1004–1009)

Orders
- Consecration: 1004
- Created cardinal: 1004 by John XVIII

Personal details
- Born: Pietro Martino Buccaporci Rome, Papal States, Holy Roman Empire
- Died: 12 May 1012 Rome, Papal States, Holy Roman Empire

Pope Sergius IV (died 12 May 1012) was the bishop of Rome and nominal ruler of the Papal States from 31 July 1009 to his death. His temporal power was eclipsed by the patrician John II Crescentius. Sergius IV may have called for the expulsion of Muslims from the Holy Land, but this is disputed. Since his time, the practice that the person who has been elected to the office of pope takes on a new name became a tradition.

== Early life ==
Pietro Martino Buccaporci was born in Rome in the "Pina" district, at an unknown date, the son of Peter the Shoemaker and Stephania. Buccaporci ("Pig's snout") was neither his birth name nor the name of his family, but apparently a nickname given to him because of his personal habits.

In 1004, he became the bishop of Albano. He was elected pope after the abdication of John XVIII in 1009, and adopted the name Sergius IV.

== Pontificate ==
The power held by Sergius IV was small and often overshadowed by the patrician, John II Crescentius, the ruler of the city of Rome at the time. With the help of Crescentius, Sergius resisted the attempts of Emperor Henry II to establish control over Rome. Sergius IV acted to relieve famine in the city, and he exempted several monasteries from episcopal rule.

A papal bull calling for Muslims to be driven from the Holy Land after the Church of the Holy Sepulchre was destroyed in 1009 by the Fatimid caliph al-Hakim bi-Amr Allah has been attributed to Sergius IV, although its authenticity has long been a matter of debate. Carl Erdmann considered it genuine, but it was rejected at length by Aleksander Gieysztor, who suggested that it was actually invented around the time of the First Crusade in order to help justify that expedition to Jerusalem. Subsequently, Hans Martin Schaller has argued for the document's authenticity.

== Death and legacy ==
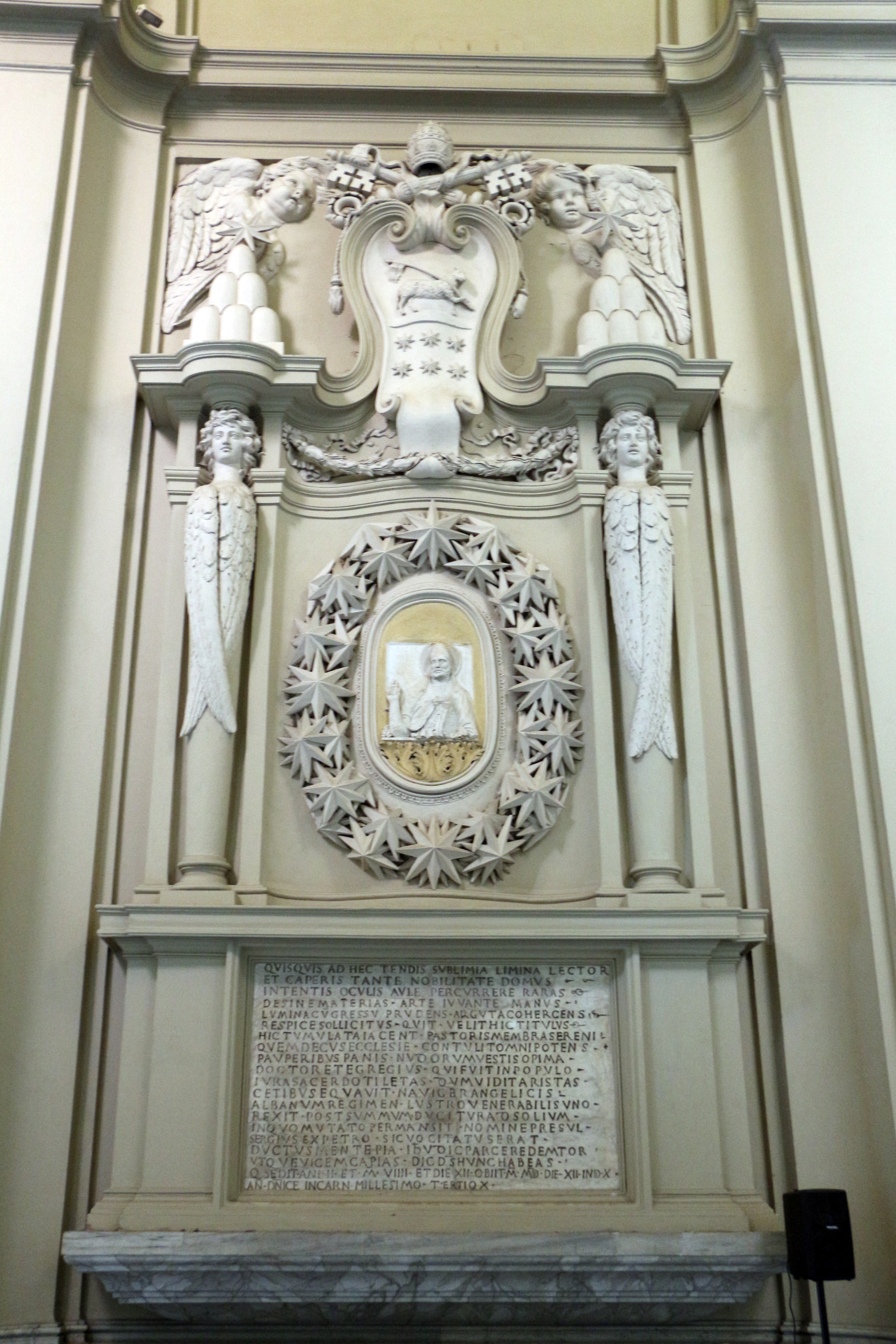
Tomb of Sergius IV in St John Lateran (18th century)

Sergius died on 12 May 1012 and was buried in the Basilica of St. John Lateran. Although not canonized, Sergius is sometimes venerated as a saint by the Benedictines of which he was a member. There was some suspicion that he was murdered, as he died within a week of John II Crescentius, considered by many to have been his patron. Sergius was followed in the papacy by Benedict VIII.

== Sources ==
- Duchesne Louis, ed. (1892). Le Liber Pontificalis (in Latin and French). Paris: E. De Boccard. p. 267.

Catholic Church titles
Preceded by John XVIII	Pope; 1009–12	Succeeded by Benedict VIII
