= Pope Benedict VIII =

Head of the Catholic Church from 1012 to 1024

- Bishop of Rome
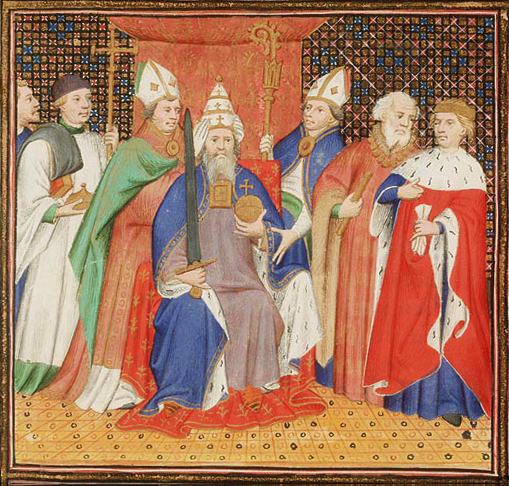
- Benedict (fifth from right) crowning Henry II Holy Roman Emperor, c. 1400
- Church: Catholic Church
- Papacy began: 18 May 1012
- Papacy ended: 9 April 1024
- Predecessor: Sergius IV
- Successor: John XIX

Personal details
- Born: Theophylact of Tusculum (Italian: Teofilatto di Toscolo) c. 980 Rome, Papal States
- Died: 9 April 1024 Rome, Papal States

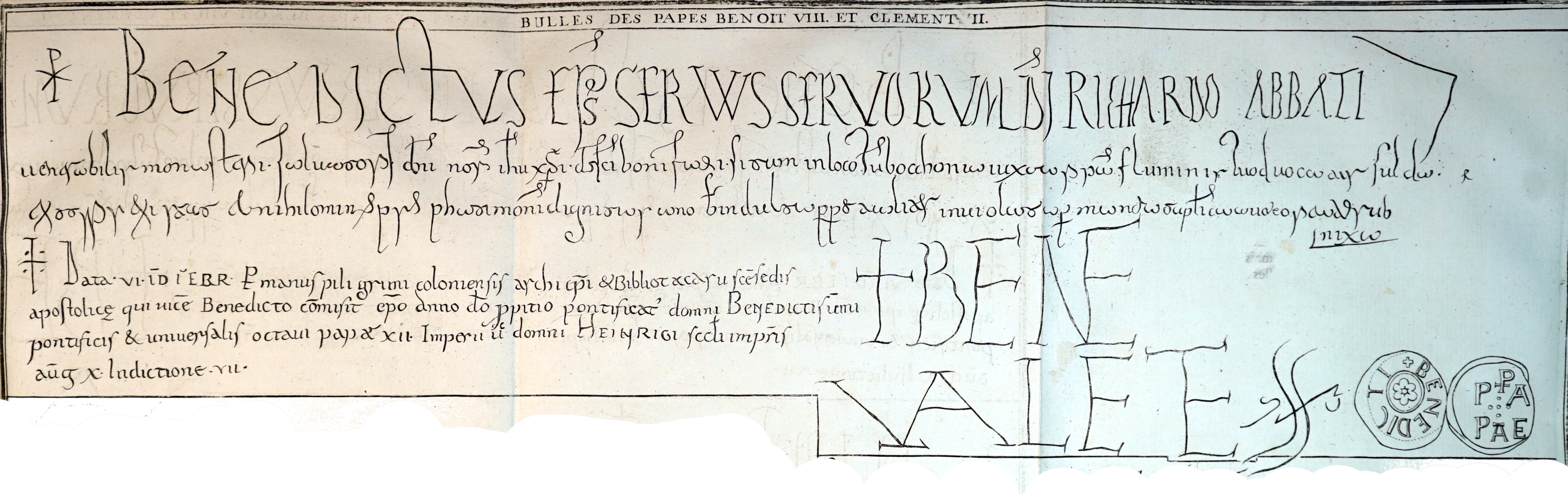
Text from a bull of Benedict VIII

Pope Benedict VIII (Latin: Benedictus VIII; c. 980 – 9 April 1024) was bishop of Rome and ruler of the Papal States from 18 May 1012 until 1024. He was born Theophylact of Tusculum to the noble family of the counts of Tusculum. Unusually for a medieval pope, he had strong authority both in Rome and abroad.

Theophylact was born to Count Gregory I of Tusculum. The family had already produced three popes: John XI (r. 931–935), John XII (r. 955–964), and Benedict VII (r. 973–974). Theophylact became pope on 18 May 1012 and took the name Benedict VIII.

== Pontificate ==
Benedict VIII was opposed by an antipope, Gregory VI, who compelled him to flee Rome. He was restored by King Henry II of Germany, whom he crowned emperor on 14 February 1014. He remained on good terms with Henry for his entire pontificate. In Benedict VIII's pontificate, the Saracens renewed their attacks on the southern coasts of Italy. They affected a settlement in Sardinia and sacked Pisa. The Normans also then began to settle in Italy. The Pope promoted peace in Italy by allying himself with the Normans, orchestrating the defeat of the Saracens in Sardinia and subjugating the Crescentii. In 1022, he held a synod at Pavia with the Emperor to restrain simony and incontinence of the clergy. The reformation sponsored by Cluny Abbey was supported by him, and he was a friend of its abbot, St. Odilo.

In 1020, Benedict VIII travelled to Germany to confer with Henry II about the renewed Byzantine menace in the Mezzogiorno. Arriving at Bamberg at Eastertide, he consecrated the new cathedral there, obtained a charter from Henry II confirming the donations of Charlemagne and Otto the Great, and visited the monastery of Fulda. In 1022, Benedict received Archbishop Æthelnoth of Canterbury, who had traveled to Rome to obtain the pallium.

To further the interest of peace, Benedict VIII encouraged the Truce of God. He convinced the Holy Roman emperor to lead an expedition into the south of Italy and subordinate his vassals who had defected to Byzantine authority. Horace Mann considered him "...one of the few popes of the Middle Ages who was at once powerful at home and great abroad." He was succeeded by his brother, John XIX.

== Family tree ==
Benedict VIII was closely related to five other popes who reigned in the 10th and 11th centuries, as well as some of the most powerful rulers of Italy at the time.

Theophylact I, Count of Tusculum	Theodora
Hugh of Italy	Marozia
Alda of Vienne	Alberic II of Spoleto; 905–954	Pope John XI r. 931–935	David or Deodatus
Pope John XII r. 955–964	Gregory I, Count of Tusculum	Pope Benedict VII r. 974–983
Pope Benedict VIII r. 1012–1024	Alberic III, Count of Tusculum	Pope John XIX r. 1024–1032
Peter, Duke of the Romans	Pope Benedict IX r. 1032–1044, 1045, 1047–1048

== See also ==
- List of popes

== Sources ==
- Logan, F. Donald (2013). A History of the Church in the Middle Ages. Routledge. ISBN 9780415669948.

Catholic Church titles
Preceded by Sergius IV	Pope; 1012–24	Succeeded by John XIX
