= Antipope Boniface VII =

Antipope in 974, 984–985

- Diocese: Rome
- Papacy began: July 974 (first papacy); c. 20 August 984 (second papacy)
- Papacy ended: c. August 974 (first papacy); 20 July 985 (second papacy)
- Predecessor: Benedict VI (first papacy); John XIV (second papacy)
- Successor: Benedict VII (first papacy); John XV (second papacy)
- Other post: Cardinal Deacon

Orders
- Created cardinal: by Pope Benedict VI

Personal details
- Born: Franco di Ferruccio
- Died: 20 July 985 Rome, Papal States

Antipope Boniface VII (Latin: Antipapa Bonifatius VII; died 20 July 985), otherwise known as Franco di Ferruccio, was a Catholic prelate who claimed the Holy See in 974 and from 984 until 985. A popular tumult compelled him to flee to Constantinople in 974; he carried off a vast treasure, and returned in 984 and removed Pope John XIV (983–984) from office. He is supposed to have put Pope Benedict VI to death. After a brief second rule, he died under suspicious circumstances. He is today considered an antipope.

== Early life ==
Originally named Franco, he was the son of Ferrucio. He was born in Italy in the late 920s or early 930s AD, although the exact date is not known. Since his surname was Franco, it has been supposed that he belonged to a family of the name which is frequently mentioned in the documents of the tenth century, and which may have been of French origin. In 972 he became a cardinal deacon, a position which he held until he began his papacy in 974. However, little else is known about his early life simply due to the lack of documents available from this period of Rome as a whole.

== Pontificate ==
=== Revolt against Benedict VI ===
When Pope John XIII died on 6 September 972, the majority of the electors who adhered to the imperial faction, elected Benedict, cardinal deacon of the church of Saint Theodore. The anti-imperial faction led by the Crescentius I the Elder, supported Franco. Benedict was consecrated on 19 January 973 but lacked the support of much of the Roman aristocracy. On 7 May 973, Otto the Great died, and Otto II took over. Otto II's preoccupation with events in Germany created an opportunity for the Roman aristocracy to rebel against the imperial administration.

Crescentius the Elder led an insurrection and with the help of many Roman malcontents, kidnapped Pope Benedict VI. They imprisoned him in Castel Sant’Angelo for nearly two months. In July 974, Franco assumed the papacy as Boniface VII. Although Otto II, who supported Pope Benedict VI, was still fighting in Bavaria, and could not make it to Rome, he sent Count Sicco, an imperial envoy from Spoleto, to demand the pope's release. When Sicco arrived at Castel Sant’Angelo, a priest named Stephen strangled Benedict VI, possibly on orders of Boniface VII.

=== First papacy ===
Boniface VII's first reign was short. In one month and twelve days, the imperial representative Count Sicco had taken possession of the city. As riots and chaos ensued, Boniface VII took refuge in Castel Sant’Angelo where he robbed the treasury of the Vatican Basilica and fled to Byzantine territory in southern Italy. The banishment of the antipope must have been the work of the imperial faction, which were again triumphant in Rome, led by Pandulf the Ironhead. Boniface VII is described as a monster by contemporaries, who stated that he was stained by the blood of Benedict VI. The events of this period in Rome are only known to us through the insufficient notes, and we are barely aware of the rise of Boniface VII before we hear of his overthrow.

Under the influence of Sicco, Benedict, Bishop of Sutri, was elected by the Roman clergy and people, as a compromise candidate in October 974. He took the name of Benedict VII. Benedict VII immediately held a synod where he excommunicated Boniface. The Emperor celebrated the Easter of 981 in Rome and so overawed the factions that Benedict was able to finish his pontificate in peace. Benedict died on 10 July 983.

=== Revolt against John XIV ===
Peter of Pavia, Otto II's imperial chancellor for the Kingdom of Italy, was elected pope, taking the name of John XIV. However, shortly after the election, the Emperor fell seriously ill and died on 7 December 983. With Otto II's heir being only aged three, the anti-imperial faction finally felt free from the hated emperor and desired a Roman Pope. To this point, Boniface VII saw his opportunity and—in league with Greeks and Saracens—headed for Rome in April 984. With the help of both the treasury, he had stolen from his first attempt at the papacy as well as the gold of his Greek followers, he was able to strike relationships with several powerful people. With the help of Crescentius the Elder’ sons, John I Crescentius and Crescentius II the Younger, Boniface had Pope John XIV imprisoned in Castel Sant’Angelo. Four months later, on 20 August 984, John XIV died in Sant’Angelo either due to starvation, poison, or by the order of Boniface.

=== Second papacy and death ===
After the death of Pope John XIV, Boniface once again took hold of the papal throne. He still believed himself to be the only rightful pope, and back-dated his reign to 974. Little is known of the second reign of Boniface VII, but on 20 July 985 he suddenly died. It is possible that he was murdered, but it cannot be confirmed by any known sources. His body was dragged through the streets and stripped naked, ultimately being left beneath Marcus Aurelius's statue in front of the Lateran Palace.

There were undoubtedly many atrocities that Boniface committed in the eleven months he was in power in 984–985, most of which were probably acts of revenge due to his previous exile. It is obvious he had become a stranger to the Roman people, and had most likely even become an inconvenience to his own followers. He was referred to as “Malefatius” instead of Bonifatius, and also “horrendum monstrum” by many, showing the turn of feelings the people of Rome had had. The anti-imperial faction, previously headed by Crescentius the Elder and now headed by his two sons, that had helped him rise to his papal status was now not so much Byzantine as it was Roman. They likely overthrew Boniface VII in hopes of seizing control of a vulnerable Rome. After a reign spanning eleven years, in which he overthrew two popes, allowing both to die in Castel Sant’Angelo, Boniface VII was finally dead. The following morning compassionate clerics removed the corpse and gave it a Christian burial.

== See also ==
- Papal selection before 1059
- Crescentius the Elder

== Sources ==
- Delogu, Paolo (1971). "Dizionario Biografico degli Italiani - Volume 12 - BONIFACIO VII, papa". Treccani.
- Romeo, Carlo (1984). "Dizionario Biografico degli Italiani - Volume 30 - CRESCENZIO de Theodora". Treccani.
- This article incorporates text from this source, which is in the public domain: 9th edition (1880s) of an unnamed encyclopedia
