= Pope John XIV =

Head of the Catholic Church from 983 to 984

- Bishop of Rome
- Church: Catholic Church
- Papacy began: December 983
- Papacy ended: 20 August 984
- Predecessor: Benedict VII
- Successor: John XV

Personal details
- Born: Peter Canepanova Pavia, Italy
- Died: 20 August 984 Castel Sant'Angelo, Rome, Papal States
- Buried: Old St. Peter's Basilica, Rome

Pope John XIV (Latin: Ioannes XIV; died 20 August 984), born Peter Canepanova, was the bishop of Rome and ruler of the Papal States from December 983 until his death. Upon the death of Pope Benedict VII in July 983, Emperor Otto II nominated Canepanova to the papal throne after the abbot Maiolus of Cluny refused the office. The decision to install the then bishop of Pavia was made without consultation with the clergy and the Roman people, nor was it confirmed by formal election.

Canepanova took the papal name John. Otto's death in December left the Pope without allies, and he was deposed and confined at Castel Sant'Angelo after the seizure of the papal throne by Antipope Boniface VII. John died, either by starvation or poisoning, on 20 August 984 and was buried in Old St. Peter's Basilica.

== Pontificate ==
John XIV was born as Peter Canepanova in Pavia. When Pope Benedict VII died on 10 July 983, Emperor Otto II (r. 973–983) wished to enthrone Maiolus of Cluny, a renowned Burgundian abbot, as the new bishop of Rome, but Maiolus refused the office. As a second option, the Emperor selected Canepanova, who was by then the bishop of Pavia and had previously served as Otto's archchancellor in Italy. Negotiations with Canepanova stalled until December, at which point he accepted the papal throne.

Upon his accession, Canepanova decided to adopt a new papal name — John – to avoid taking the name of Saint Peter. The appointment of John XIV occurred without the consultation of the clergy or the people of Rome, and there is no evidence that a formal election ever took place. As such, John relied solely upon the Emperor's support. The only extant document from John's pontificate is a bull that granted a pallium to Alo, the archbishop of Benevento; the action is indicative of Otto's political interests in southern Italy.

Soon after John's installation, the Emperor fell ill with malaria and died on 7 December 983 in the Pope's arms after John performed the rites of absolution. His widow, the Empress Theophanu, immediately left Rome to travel to Germany to protect the interests of her infant son Otto III (r. 980–1002), leaving John isolated in the city without allies. Upon the return of Antipope Boniface VII from Constantinople in April 984 and his installation as pope by the influential Crescentii family, John was assaulted, deposed, and confined at Castel Sant'Angelo. Information regarding the charges laid against John do not survive, nor do any details surrounding his trial. John died four months after his imprisonment, either of starvation or poisoning. The historian Hans-Henning Kortüm wrote that, "Because of the brevity and weakness of his reign, very few documents bear his name". John was buried in Old St. Peter's Basilica; his tomb was destroyed in the seventeenth century during the Basilica's demolition. His epitaph there, erected under the pontificate of Antipope Boniface VII, records John's death date as 20 August 984, but does not state a cause of death. Because Antipope Boniface VII was only considered an antipope in the 20th-century, Pope John XV was considered to be the successor of Antipope Boniface VII and not John XIV.

== Sources ==
- Kelly, J. N. D.; Walsh, M. J. (1988) [1986]. Oxford Dictionary of Popes. Oxford University Press. ISBN 9780192820853.
- Levillain, Philippe, ed. (2002). The Papacy: an Encyclopedia. Vol. 2. New York City: Routledge. ISBN 0415922283.
- McBrien, Richard P. (2000). Lives of the Popes. New York, NY: HarperCollins. ISBN 9780060653040.
- Reardon, Wendy J. (2004). The Deaths of the Popes. Jefferson, North Carolina: McFarland & Co. ISBN 0786415274.

Catholic Church titles
Preceded by Benedict VII	Pope; 983–984	Succeeded by John XV
