= Pope John XVII =

Head of the Catholic Church in 1003

- Bishop of Rome
- Church: Catholic Church
- Papacy began: 16 May 1003
- Papacy ended: 6 November 1003
- Predecessor: Sylvester II
- Successor: John XVIII

Personal details
- Born: Giovanni Sicco Rome, Papal States
- Died: 6 November 1003 Rome, Papal States

The Papal States in the year 1000

Pope John XVII (Latin: Ioannes XVII; died 6 November 1003), born John Sicco, was the bishop of Rome and nominal ruler of the Papal States for about seven months in 1003. He was one of the popes chosen and eclipsed by the patrician John II Crescentius.

== Family ==
John Sicco was the son of another John Sicco, and was born in the region of Rome then referred to as Biveretica. Before entering the priesthood, Sicco had been married and had three sons who also entered holy orders: John, bishop of Praeneste; Peter, a deacon; and Andrew, a secundicerius.

== Pontificate ==
John XVII succeeded Sylvester II as pope on 16 May 1003. He was nominated to the papacy by John II Crescentius, a Roman noble who held power in the city. John XVII approved of a mission led by Bruno of Querfurt to Eastern Europe. Bruno also requested John XVII to authorize his companion Benedict to evangelize among the Slavs.

John died on 6 November 1003 and was buried in the Lateran Basilica between the two doors of the principal façade. According to John the Deacon, his epitaph began by stating that "here is the tomb of the supreme John, who is said to be pope, for so he was called." John XVII's successor, John XVIII, was also selected by John Crescentius.

== Literature ==
- Udo Tavares (1992). "Johannes XVII.". In Bautz, Friedrich Wilhelm (ed.). Biographisch-Bibliographisches Kirchenlexikon (BBKL) (in German). Vol. 3. Herzberg: Bautz. cols. 217–220. ISBN 3-88309-035-2.
- John N. D. Kelly: Reclams Lexikon der Päpste. 2nd edition, Reclam, Stuttgart, 2005 ISBN 3-15-010588-9, sub voce.
- Antonio Sennis: Giovanni XVII. In: Massimo Bray (ed.): Enciclopedia dei Papi. Volume 2: Niccolò I, santo, Sisto IV. Istituto della Enciclopedia Italiana, Rome 2000, pp. 125–126 (treccani.it).

Catholic Church titles
Preceded by Silvester II	Pope; 1003	Succeeded by John XVIII
