= Pope Benedict VI =

Head of the Catholic Church from 973 to 974

- Bishop of Rome
- Church: Catholic Church
- Papacy began: 19 January 973
- Papacy ended: June 974
- Predecessor: John XIII
- Successor: Benedict VII
- Previous post: Cardinal-Priest (964–974)

Personal details
- Born: 950 Rome, Papal States
- Died: June 974 Rome, Papal States, Holy Roman Empire

Pope Benedict VI (Latin: Benedictus VI; 950 – June 974) was the bishop of Rome and ruler of the Papal States from 19 January 973 to his death in 974. His brief pontificate occurred in the political context of the establishment of the Holy Roman Empire, during the transition between the reigns of Otto I and Otto II, incorporating the struggle for power of Roman aristocratic families such as the Crescentii.

== Early life ==
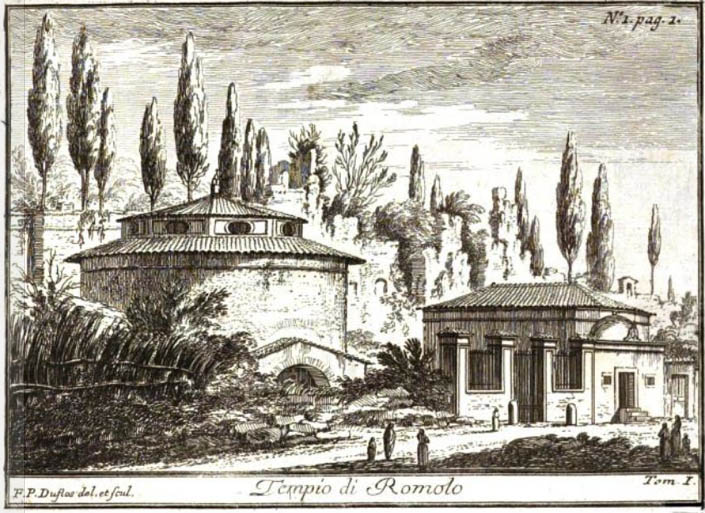
Benedict VI was cardinal deacon of San Teodoro, Rome (18th century image)

The son of a Roman of German ancestry named Hildebrand, Benedict was born in Rome in the region called Sub Capitolio (in what was the old 8th region of Augustan Rome, the Forum Romanum). Prior to becoming pope, he was the cardinal deacon of the church of Saint Theodore.

== Pontificate ==
On the death of Pope John XIII in September 972, the majority of the electors who adhered to the imperial faction chose Benedict VI to be his successor. He was not consecrated until January 973, due to the need to gain the approval of the Holy Roman emperor, Otto I. Installed as pope under the protection of Otto I, Benedict was seen as a puppet of the emperor by the local Roman aristocracy who resented the emperor's dominance in Roman civil and ecclesiastical affairs.

Record of Benedict VI's reign as pope is scant. There is a letter dated to Benedict's reign from Pilgrim of Passau, asking for Benedict to confer on him the pallium, and make him a bishop so that he could continue his mission to convert the Hungarian people to Christianity. However, the response from Benedict is considered to be a forgery. Benedict VI is also known to have confirmed privileges assumed by certain monasteries and churches. At the request of King Lothair and Queen Emma of France, Benedict placed the monastery of Blandin under papal protection. There is also a papal bull from Benedict in which Frederick, archbishop of Salzburg, and his successors are named papal vicars in the former Roman provinces of Upper and Lower Pannonia and Noricum; however, the authenticity of this bull is also disputed.

== Overthrow ==
Otto I died soon after Benedict VI's election in 973, and with the accession of Otto II, troubles with the nobility emerged in Germany. With the new emperor so distracted, a faction of the Roman nobility opposed to the interference of the Ottonian emperors in Roman affairs, took advantage of the opportunity to move against Benedict VI. Led by Crescentius the Elder and Cardinal-Deacon Franco Ferrucci, who had been the preferred candidate of the anti-Ottonian faction, Benedict was taken in June 974, and imprisoned in the Castel Sant'Angelo, at that time a stronghold of the Crescentii. Ferrucci was then proclaimed as the new pope, taking the name Boniface VII.

Hearing of the overthrow of Benedict VI, Otto II sent an imperial representative, Count Sicco, to demand his release. Unwilling to step down, Boniface ordered a priest named Stephen to murder Benedict while he was in prison, strangling him to death. Boniface VII is today considered an antipope, with Benedict VII as the legitimate successor of Benedict VI.

== Notes ==
Catholic Church titles
Preceded by John XIII	Pope; 973–974	Succeeded by Benedict VII
