= Pope John XVIII =

Head of the Catholic Church from 1004 to 1009

- Bishop of Rome
- Church: Catholic Church
- Papacy began: 25 December, 1003
- Papacy ended: 18 July, 1009
- Predecessor: John XVII
- Successor: Sergius IV

Personal details
- Born: Giovanni Fasano o Carminati Rome, Papal States
- Died: July 1009 Rome, Papal States

Pope John XVIII (Latin: Ioannes XVIII; died June or July 1009) was the bishop of Rome and nominal ruler of the Papal States from 25 December 1003 to his abdication in July 1009. He wielded little temporal power, ruling during the struggle between John II Crescentius and Emperor Henry II for the control of Rome. He was the last pope to use his baptismal name for centuries. Every pope after him (with the exceptions of Adrian VI and Marcellus II) has taken on a new papal name.

== Family ==
John was born to the Fasano family in Rome. His father was a priest, either named Leo according to Johann Peter Kirsch, or Ursus according to Horace Kinder Mann.

== Pontificate 1003 - 1009 ==
John owed his election to the influence and power of the Crescentii clan. During his whole pontificate, he was allegedly subordinate to the head of the Crescentii, who controlled Rome, the patricius (an aristocratic military leader) John II Crescentius. This period was disrupted by continuing conflicts between the Ottonian Emperor Henry II and Arduin of Ivrea, who had claimed the Kingdom of Italy in 1002 after the death of Emperor Otto III. Rome was wracked with bouts of plague, and Saracens operated freely out of the Emirate of Sicily ravaging the Tyrrhenian coasts.

As pope, John XVIII occupied his time mainly with details of ecclesiastical administration. He authorized a new Diocese of Bamberg to serve as a base for missionary activity among the Slavs, a concern of Henry II. He also adjudicated the over-reaching of the bishops of Sens and Orléans regarding the privileges of the abbot of Fleury. John was successful in creating, at least temporarily, a rapprochement between the Eastern and Western churches. His name could be found on Eastern diptychs and he was prayed for in Masses in Constantinople.

John XVIII abdicated in July 1009 and, according to one catalogue of popes, retired to a monastery, where he died shortly afterwards. His successor was Pope Sergius IV.

Catholic Church titles
Preceded by John XVII	Pope; 1004–09	Succeeded by Sergius IV
