= Robert Buckley Comyn =

British judge

Sir Robert Buckley Comyn

Chief Justice of the Madras High Court
- In office 1835–1842
- Preceded by: Sir Ralph Palmer
- Succeeded by: Sir Edward John Gambier

Personal details
- Born: 26 October 1792
- Died: 23 May 1853 (aged 60)
- Occupation: lawyer, judge
- Profession: Chief Justice

Sir Robert Buckley Comyn (26 October 1792 – 23 May 1853) was a British judge who served as Chief Justice of the Madras High Court in British India from 1835 to 1842.

Born at Tottenham, the third son of Rev. Thomas Comyn, M.A. (Balliol College, Oxford), vicar of Tottenham and Chaplain of the Royal Hospital, Chelsea, and Harriet Charlotte (née Stables), Comyn was educated at the Merchant Taylors' School, then St John's College, Oxford (B.A. 1813, M.A. 1815). His grandfather, Stephen Comyn, of Widial, Herts., was a barrister and Bencher of the Inner Temple, as was his uncle, Robert Valens Comyn, and Robert elected to join this profession.

He was called to the Bar from Lincoln's Inn in 1814, and was in practice until his appointment as a puisne judge at Calcutta in 1825. He was knighted in February of that year. In 1835, Comyn was appointed Chief Justice of the Madras High Court, and remained in that capacity until his retirement in 1842. He received the degree of D.C.L. from Oxford, and was elected a Bencher of the Middle Temple in 1844.

Comyn wrote three books: two on law (on usury and landlord/ tenant law), and one volume on the history of Western Europe from the time of Charlemagne to that of Charles I.

Comyn's sister, Harriet (died 1817), married firstly, Thomas Ainley, of Gloucester, then, as his widow, married in 1814 to John Stracey, of Sprouston Lodge, Norfolk, son of Sir Edward Stracey, 1st Baronet, of Rackheath Hall, Norfolk. The Comyn family descended from Robert Comyn, Archdeacon of Salop (now Ludlow) from 1713 to circa 1727.
