= Summus Senator =

Medieval title of Rome

Summus Senator (Latin for "Highest Senator") is a medieval title briefly used to denote the head of the civil government of Rome.

== History ==
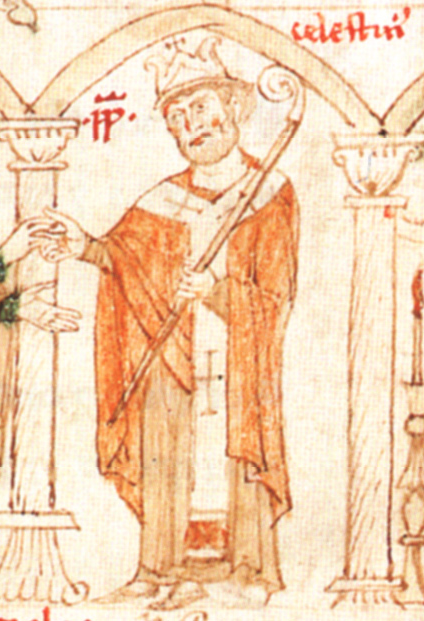
The first Summus Senator of Rome, Benedetto Carushomo, was politically opposed by Pope Celestine III (pictured).

=== Background ===
After the fall of the Western Roman Empire in AD 476, the Roman Senate continued to function, but it became increasingly irrelevant and seems to have disappeared in the seventh century. Usage of the "senator" title was eventually revived in 1144, when the Commune of Rome attempted to establish a new 56-member senate in opposition to the temporal power of the nobles and the pope. In 1191, however, a popular uprising overthrew the senate in favor of a single individual, styled Summus Senator, who subsequently became the head of the civil government of Rome.

=== Municipal role ===
The first Summus Senator, a man named Benedetto Carushomo. Carushomo was politically opposed to Pope Celestine III, and he prevented the pope from appointing provincial judges or raising revenue. The pope, initially having viewed Carushomo's power as illegitimate, was soon forced to recognize his municipal authority. After two years in power, however, Carushomo was overthrown in the second half of 1193 and imprisoned. Power returned to the 56-person senate. Then power went to the Summus Senator again in early 1194, which was a noble named Giovanni Capocci.

After Capocci, a senate of 56 members was briefly restored in 1194, power was quickly seized by Giovanni Pierleone, who ruled until 1197. Pierleone was briefly succeeded by Scottus Paparone, but when Innocent III was elected to the papacy, the new pope convinced Paparone to resign. This ultimately brought the senate under the authority of the pope. Within a few years, the multi-member senate would be restored, but by this point, the institution would come to be composed largely of nobles.
