= Pope John XV =

Head of the Catholic Church from 985 to 996

- Bishop of Rome
- Church: Catholic Church
- Papacy began: August 985
- Papacy ended: March 996
- Predecessor: John XIV
- Successor: Gregory V

Personal details
- Born: Rome, Papal States
- Died: March 996 Rome, Papal States

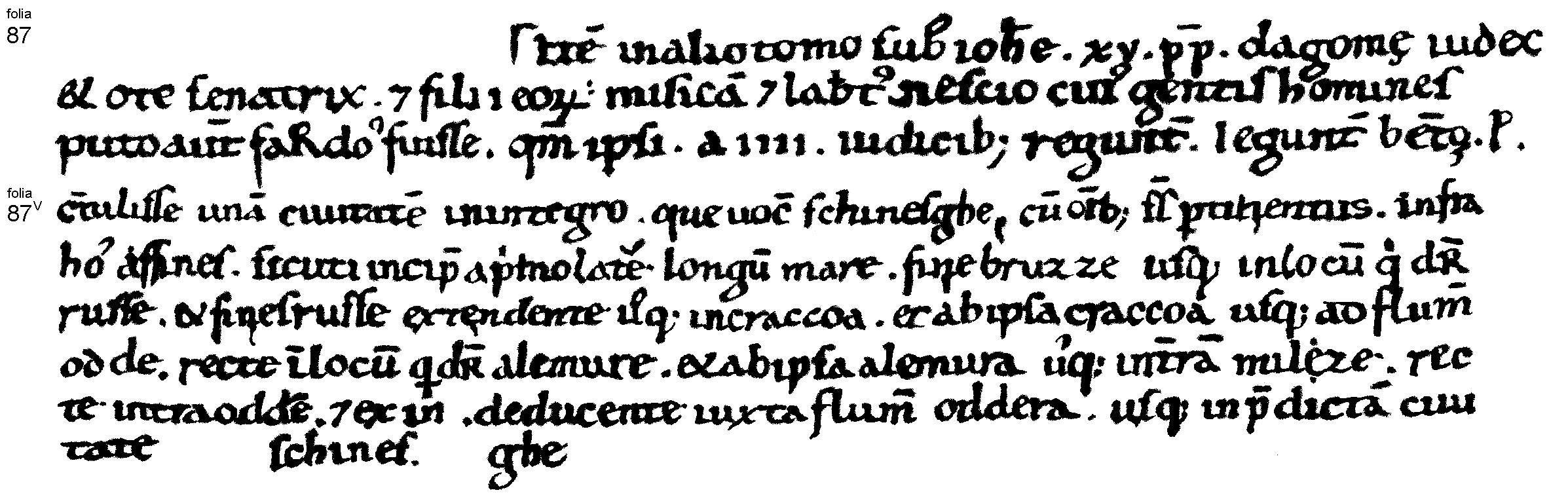
Pope John XV is mentioned in the Dagome iudex, one of the earliest written records of the nation of Poland.

Pope John XV (Latin: Ioannes XV, Italian: Giovanni XV; died March 996) was the bishop of Rome and ruler of the Papal States from August 985 until his death. A Roman by birth, he was the first pope who canonized a saint. The origins of the investiture controversy stem from John XV's pontificate, when the dispute about the deposition of Archbishop Arnulf of Reims soured the relationship between the Capetian kings of France and the Holy See.

== Early life ==
John XV was the son of Leo, a Roman presbyter. Before he became pope in August 985, John was cardinal-priest of St. Vitalis.

== Pontificate ==
John XV's venality and nepotism allegedly made him very unpopular with the citizens of Rome. However, Joseph Brusher finds this unproven, as John XV had little authority in Rome at that time. Crescentius II, patrician of Rome, significantly hampered the pope's influence, but the presence of Empress Theophanu in Rome from 989 to 991 restrained Crescentius' ambition.

John was a patron and protector of the reforming monks of Cluny. Through his legate Leo, he mediated a dispute between King Ethelred the Unready of England and Duke Richard the Fearless of Normandy.

=== French dispute ===
During this papacy, a serious dispute arose over the deposition in 991 of Archbishop Arnulf of Reims by French churchmen. This affair is sometimes read as an early groundswell of the conflicts between popes and the Capetians, new kings of France, that came to a head later in the Investiture Controversy. King Hugh Capet made Arnulf archbishop of Reims in 988. Arnulf was the scion of the previously ruling dynasty, the Carolingians. Arnulf's uncle Charles invaded to claim the throne for himself. Hugh considered Arnulf a turncoat and demanded his deposition by John XV. The turn of events outran the messages, when Hugh Capet captured both Charles and Archbishop Arnulf and convoked a synod at Reims in June 991, which obediently deposed Arnulf and chose as his successor Gerbert of Aurillac. At the synod, Bishop Arnulf of Orléans accused Pope John XV:

Are any bold enough to maintain that the priests of the Lord all over the world are to take their law from monsters of guilt like these—men branded with ignominy, illiterate men, and ignorant alike of things human and divine? If, holy fathers, we are bound to weigh in the balance the lives, the morals, and the attainments of the humblest candidate for the priestly office, how much more ought we to look to the fitness of him who aspires to be the Lord and Master of all priests! Yet how would it fare with us, if it should happen that the man the most deficient in all these virtues, unworthy of the lowest place in the priesthood, should be chosen to fill the highest place of all? What would you say of such a one, when you see him sitting upon the throne glittering in purple and gold? Must he not be the "Antichrist, sitting in the temple of God and showing himself as God"?

The proceedings of the Synod of Reims were repudiated by Rome, although a second synod had ratified the decrees issued at Reims. John XV summoned the French bishops to hold an independent synod outside the French king's realm at Aachen to reconsider the case. When they refused, he called them to Rome, but they protested that the unsettled conditions en route and in Rome made that impossible. The Pope then sent a legate with instructions to call a council of French and German bishops at Mousson, where only the German bishops appeared, the French being stopped on the way by Hugh Capet and his son Robert. Through the exertions of the legate, the deposition of Arnulf was finally pronounced illegal. After Hugh Capet's death on 23 October 996, Arnulf was released from his imprisonment and soon restored to all his dignities. As for Gerbert, he set out for the imperial court at Magdeburg and became the preceptor to Emperor Otto III.

=== First canonization ===
At a Roman synod held in the Lateran on 31 January 993, John XV solemnly canonized Bishop Ulrich of Augsburg, an event which the pope announced to the French and German bishops in a papal bull dated 3 February. This was the first time in history that a solemn canonization had been made by a pope.

== Death ==
In 996, Otto III undertook a journey to Italy to obtain an imperial coronation from the pope, but John XV died of fever in March 996, while Otto III lingered in Pavia until April 12 to celebrate Easter. The emperor then elevated his own cousin Bruno to the papal dignity under the name of Gregory V.

Catholic Church titles
Preceded by John XIV	Pope; 985–996	Succeeded by Gregory V
