= Pope Benedict VII =

Head of the Catholic Church from 974 to 983

- Bishop of Rome
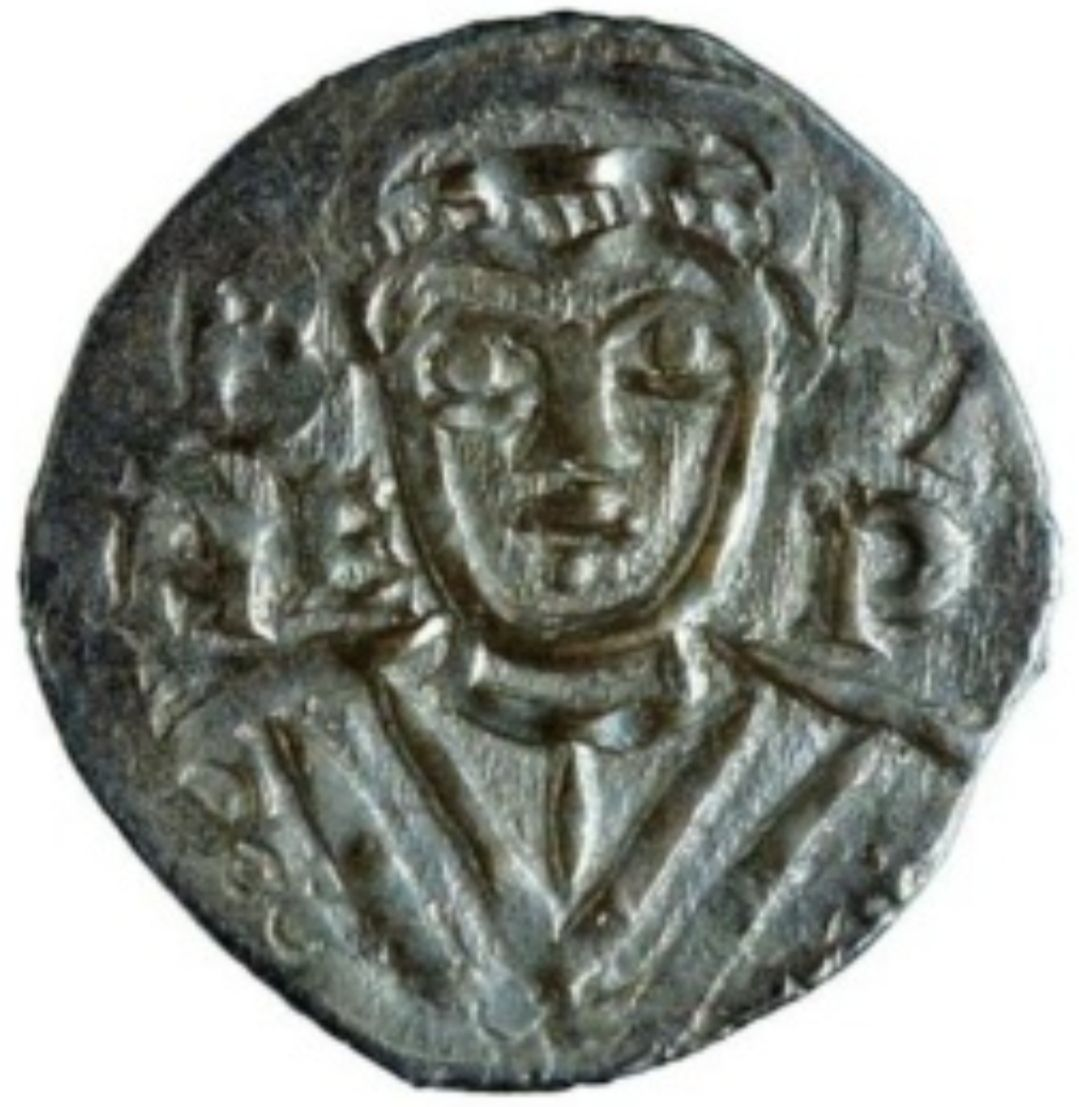
- Denarius of Benedict VII
- Church: Catholic Church
- Papacy began: October 974
- Papacy ended: 10 July 983
- Predecessor: Benedict VI
- Successor: John XIV
- Previous post: Cardinal-Priest of San Teodoro (972–974)

Personal details
- Born: bea Lacosta Rome, Papal States
- Died: 10 July 983 Rome, Papal States

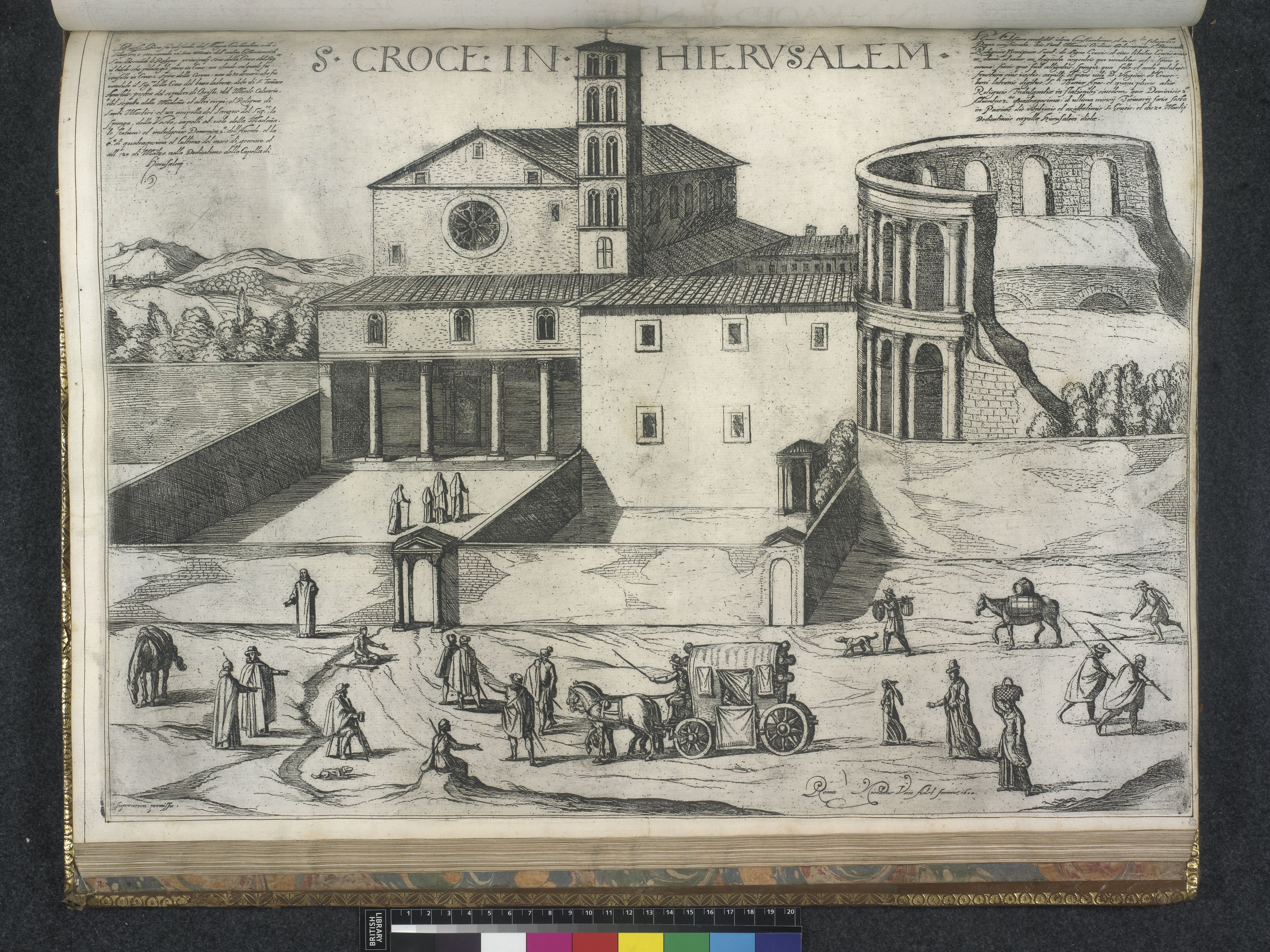
Benedict VII was buried at Santa Croce in Gerusalemme (16th/17th century illustration)

Pope Benedict VII (Latin: Benedictus VII; died 10 July 983) was the bishop of Rome and ruler of the Papal States from October 974 to his death on 10 July 983.

== Family and early career ==
Benedict was born in Rome, the son of David or Deodatus and nephew of Alberic II of Spoleto. He was also connected to the Conti family. Before his accession to the papacy, he served as bishop of Sutri.

== Pontificate ==
Benedict VII was elected pope by the Roman clergy and people in October 974 under the influence of Sicco, envoy of Emperor Otto II. He ascended as a compromise candidate to replace Boniface VII, who had caused the death of Pope Benedict VI, usurped the pontificate, and in a month plundered the Vatican of its most valuable contents. He then escaped to Constantinople. The new pope's authority was opposed by Boniface VII and his supporters, and although the antipope himself was forced to flee, his party followed fiercely in his footsteps and compelled Benedict to call upon Otto II for help. Once he was firmly established on his throne by the emperor, he showed himself both desirous of checking the tide of simony which was rising high in the Church, and of advancing the cause of monasticism.

Benedict VII consecrated the priest James, who had been sent to him by the people of Carthage "to help the wretched province of Africa," which since the Muslim conquest of the Maghreb, had seen a steep decline in the number of bishops. Benedict VII visited the city of Orvieto with his nephew Filippo Alberici, who later settled there and became consul of the city in 1016. In 978, Benedict issued a bull defining the boundaries of the Diocese of Vic for Bishop Froia, thereby rescinding the bulls issued by Pope John XIII that had made Vic an archdiocese. In March 981, Benedict presided over a synod in St Peter's that prohibited simony. In September 981, he convened a Lateran synod.

Benedict VII died in 983, and was interred at Santa Croce in Gerusalemme.

Catholic Church titles
Preceded by Benedict VI	Pope; 974–983	Succeeded by John XIV
