= Crescentii =

Italian noble family

House of Crescentii
- Noble house
- Arms of the House of Crescenzi (Crescentii-Ottaviani)
- Country: Papal States; Holy Roman Empire; Kingdom of Naples
- Current region: Italy
- Origin: Rome
- Founded: Before 902
- Founder: Judex Crescentius (?)
- Final ruler: Virgilio Crescenzi (Last marquess of Montorio al Vomano)
- Final head: John II Crescentius (agnatic); Marcello Crescenzi (cognatic)
- Titles: List: Patrician of Rome (985–990 and 1002–1012); Senator of Rome (985–998); Rector of Sabina (988–1106, with interregnums); Count of Palombara (1003–1250); Count of Terni (1159–1174); Count of Palestrina (970–1014); Count of Montecelio (c.1025–c.1204); Count of Moricone (1003–1378); Count of Terracina (985–990); Marquess of Montorio al Vomano (1597–1761)
- Estates: Castle of Nomentum, Mentana; Savelli-Torlonia Castle, Palombara; Castel Sant'Angelo
- Dissolution: 1012 (Main branch); 24 August 1768 (Cognatic branches)
- Cadet branches: Stefaniani; Ottaviani (Renamed to Crescenzi in c. 1250); De Palombara; Serlupi Crescenzi

The House of Crescentii (Italian: Crescenzi) were a powerful noble family from Latium that dominated the political and ecclesiastical affairs of Rome from 974 until 1012. Their principal seat of power was Sabina, along with the city of Mentana, while their influence in Rome was centred around Castel Sant'Angelo.

The Crescentii exercised considerable influence over papal elections and the government of the Papal States. Their political ascendancy reached its height under Crescentius II the Younger, who led an uprising against Emperor Otto III. Following Crescentius II's execution in 998, his son John II Crescentius restored the family's authority and maintained influence over successive papal appointments until his death in 1012. The extinction of the main branch brought an end to the Crescentii's direct rule over Rome and allowed the rival Counts of Tusculum to establish their supremacy over the papacy.

Several cadet branches continued to exercise considerable political and territorial influence in Latium. The Crescentii-Stefaniani retained extensive possessions and contested control of Sabina during the early 11th century, while the Crescentii-Ottaviani established hereditary lordships centred on Palombara and Montecelio. From the 13th century onwards, the Ottaviani adopted the surname Crescenzi, and their descendants continued to hold prominent civic, military and ecclesiastical offices in Rome, including several cardinalates, until the family became extinct in 1768.

== Main branch ==
=== Origins and Early History ===
The origins of the Crescentii family can be traced to a Roman aristocrat named Crescentius, who may have witnessed two judicial assemblies (placita) held in Rome in February 902, under Emperor Louis III (r. 900–905). Another possible early member of the family was senator John, who joined senator Theophylact I, the effective ruler of Rome, in the Battle of Garigliano of 915. John may have been the son or brother of the earlier Crescentius. These figures belonged to the Roman aristocratic circle surrounding Alberic II of Spoleto, Theophylact I's grandson, who ruled Rome from 932 with the titles of princeps atque omnium Romanorum senator (Prince and senator of all the Romans).

Two branches of the Crescentii are thought to have descended from them. One was represented by John, husband of Theodora II (Alberic II's aunt), whose children included senatrix Theodora III, Crescentius I the Elder, senatrix Marozia II and senatrix Stephania. The other descended from his brother, Crescentius of the Marble Horse. (Note: Crescentius' epithet derives from the regio caballi marmorei, an area of the Quirinal Hill associated with the Horse Tamers, a colossal pair of marble horse statues, now in the Fontana dei Dioscuri.) One of the most prominent members of the Roman aristocracy during the reign of Emperor Otto I (r. 962–973), Crescentius of the Marble Horse is first recorded in 963, when he participated in the Synod of Rome that deposed Alberic II's son, Pope John XII (r. 955–964). In October 965, he supported the election of Pope John XIII (r. 965–972). In December 965, however, a group of Roman nobles opposed to John XIII, led by Peter, prefect of Rome, Rofred of Veroli, Count of Campagna, and the vestiarius Stephen, revolted against the pope and took him prisoner. The rebels transferred him to Campagna and seized control of Rome.

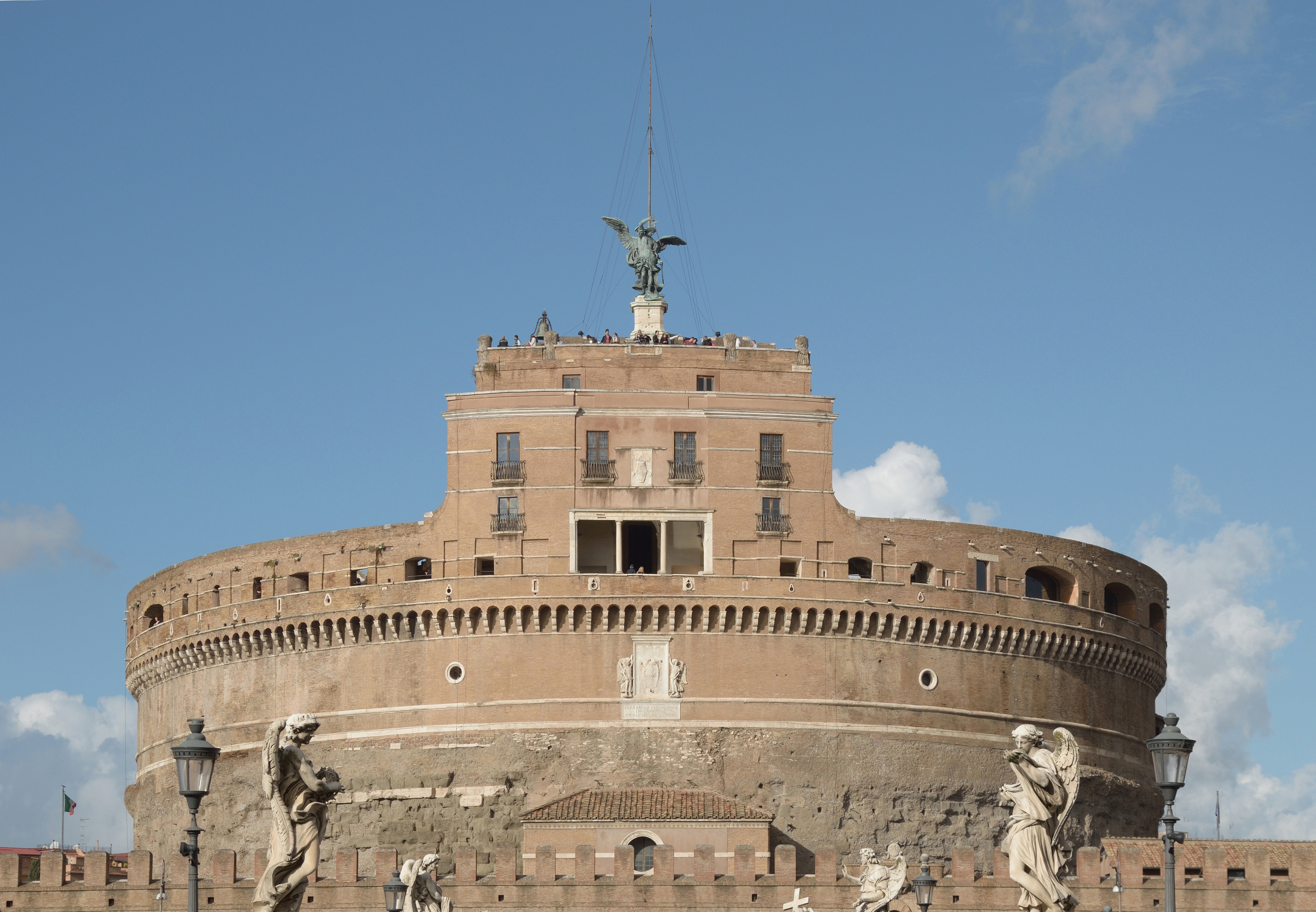
Castel Sant'Angelo, stronghold of the Crescentii in Rome.

In the autumn of 966, following news of Otto I's renewed expedition to Italy, the pope's supporters rose against the rebels. Among them was John, son of Crescentius, who killed Count Rofred with his own hand. Following the restoration of his authority, John XIII strengthened his alliance with his aristocratic supporters by arranging the marriage of his nephew Benedict, son of his sister Stephania, to Theodoranda, daughter of Crescentius. Following Theodoranda's death, Benedict married senatrix Stephania, thereby renewing the alliance with the Crescentii. In 970, the pope granted the County of Palestrina and its surrounding territory (Zagarolo and San Cesareo) to Stephania, and the Rectorate of Sabina, with its seat at Mentana, to Benedict.

=== Rule over Rome ===
==== Crescentius I ====
By 974, Crescentius I the Elder appears to have been the only surviving prominent member of the main line of his family, as the other Crescentii, including Crescentius of the Marble Horse, had apparently died. He became increasingly involved in the political struggles surrounding the papal succession after the death of John XIII. He supported the election of the deacon Franco di Ferruccio, but the imperial court instead backed Pope Benedict VI (r. 973–974), whose election was supported by Otto I. The emperor's death in 973 and the preoccupation of his successor, Otto II (r. 973–983), with affairs in Germany weakened imperial authority in Rome. Crescentius I took advantage of this situation and, in June 974, led an aristocratic revolt that deposed Benedict VI and established Franco, who took the name Boniface VII, as antipope.

However, the revolt provoked an imperial response: Otto II sent his representative, Count Sicco, to Rome to restore Benedict VI. Before Sicco could secure the pope's release, Boniface VII had Benedict strangled in prison. Boniface subsequently lost the support of the Crescentian faction and fled to Constantinople. Crescentius I then reached an agreement with Sicco, and in October 974, the Romans and the imperial representative supported the election of Pope Benedict VII (r. 974–983).

==== John I Crescentius and Crescentius II ====
The death of Benedict VII on 10 July 983, followed by that of Otto II on 7 December 983, weakened imperial authority in Rome, particularly as Otto's heir, Otto III (r. 996–1002), was still a young child, creating an opportunity for the Crescentii, now led by the brothers John I Crescentius and Crescentius II the Younger, to reassert their influence. Otto II's appointee, Pope John XIV (r. 983–984), formerly Peter, bishop of Pavia, had depended on imperial protection and lacked substantial support among the Roman aristocracy. In April 984, Boniface VII returned to Rome from Constantinople and, with the backing of John I Crescentius and the city's aristocracy, regained the papacy. John XIV was arrested and imprisoned in Castel Sant'Angelo, where he died on 20 August 984 after four months of captivity. Boniface remained for approximately eleven months, until his death in 985.

The Crescentii subsequently strengthened their position in Rome. John I Crescentius became patrician and appointed Pope John XV (r. 985–996), while his brother Crescentius II held the title of senator and received the County of Terracina from the pope. During his pontificate, John XV also established close relations with Theophanu, regent and mother of Otto III. Theophanu's death on 15 June 991 weakened the political stability that had surrounded the young emperor and his supporters. Around the same time, John I Crescentius appears to have died, and his brother Crescentius II succeeded him as the leading political figure in the city, retaining the title of senator.

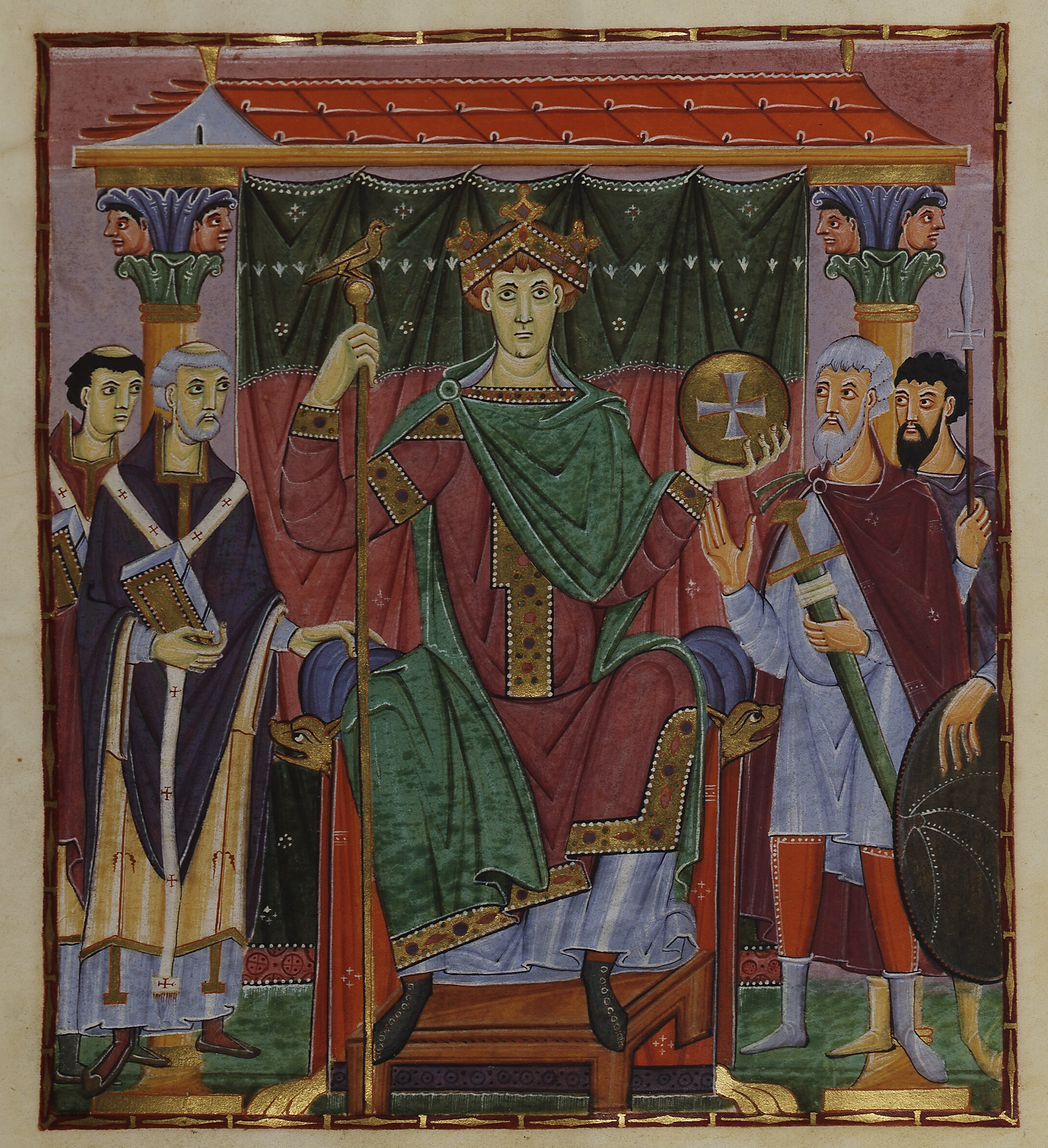
Emperor Otto III

Relations between Crescentius II and John XV gradually deteriorated as the senator sought to assert greater independence from papal and imperial authority. In 995, John XV appealed to Otto III for assistance against Crescentius II, prompting the emperor to prepare an expedition to Italy. The pope subsequently reconciled with Crescentius II, but died in April 996 before Otto reached Rome. The emperor then appointed his cousin Bruno of Carinthia as Pope Gregory V (r. 996–999), who crowned Otto emperor on 21 May 996. At a synod held shortly afterwards, Crescentius II was condemned to exile for his treatment of John XV. Gregory V nevertheless intervened on his behalf, and the sentence was remitted.

After Otto III returned to Germany, Crescentius II led a revolt on 29 September 996 that forced Gregory V to flee Rome. Seeking to establish a papacy independent of imperial influence, Crescentius II supported the election of John Philagathos, bishop of Piacenza, as Pope John XVI. John XVI was installed as antipope in May 997, while Gregory V excommunicated Crescentius II at a synod held in Pavia. Otto III then crossed the Alps again in late 997 and entered Rome in February 998. John XVI fled but was captured near the coast while attempting to escape to Constantinople. He was blinded and mutilated before being imprisoned. Crescentius II and his supporters meanwhile fortified inside Castel Sant'Angelo. After a siege lasting nearly two months, imperial troops captured the fortress on 28 April 998. Crescentius II was beheaded and his body was publicly displayed on the emperor's orders.

==== John II Crescentius ====
Crescentius II's death did not end Roman resistance to imperial authority. In 1001, a new revolt led by Gregory I of Tusculum, son of senatrix Marozia II, forced Otto III to leave Rome. The emperor died the following year, allowing Crescentius II's son, John II Crescentius, to establish himself as patrician and ruler of Rome, restoring his family's political dominance over the city. John II ruled during a period of limited imperial intervention. He maintained considerable influence over papal appointments and relied on the support of the Roman aristocracy and his relatives, who held offices and controlled territories around the city.

During his rule, John II's appointees John XVII (r. 1003), John XVIII (r. 1004–1009), and Sergius IV (r. 1009–1012) occupied the papacy. John also supported relatives who held territories and offices in Sabina, where the Crescentii competed with other aristocratic families and the Abbey of Farfa for control. John II never married and died childless in 1012, ending the main branch of the Crescentii and the family's dominance over Rome. The ensuing political crisis enabled the rival Counts of Tusculum to consolidate their power with the support of Emperor Henry II (r. 1014–1024). Theophylact II of Tusculum was able to seize power and become Pope Benedict VIII (r. 1012–1024), marking the beginning of the Tusculan supremacy of the papacy and the decline of the Crescentii as the city's leading political dynasty.

== Later branches ==
=== House of Stefaniani ===
The descendants of Benedict, Rector of Sabina, and Theodoranda formed a new cadet branch, the Crescentii-Stefaniani. Following the stepping down of Benedict as rector in 988, the Stefaniani took control over the region through his two sons, John and Crescentius. John held the rectorate from 988 to 991, followed by Crescentius from 991 to 994. The family also expanded its possessions at the expense of the Abbey of Farfa, taking advantage of the death of abbot John III, to seize additional territories in 997, including Cere. In 998, Otto III moved against the Stefaniani after suppressing the revolt of Crescentius II the Younger. Crescentius was arrested in Rome and held hostage until the return of Cere was secured. When his father Benedict fled to Cere rather than surrender the disputed territory, Otto III and Pope Gregory V besieged the city and threatened to execute Crescentius. Benedict eventually surrendered the city, securing his son's release.

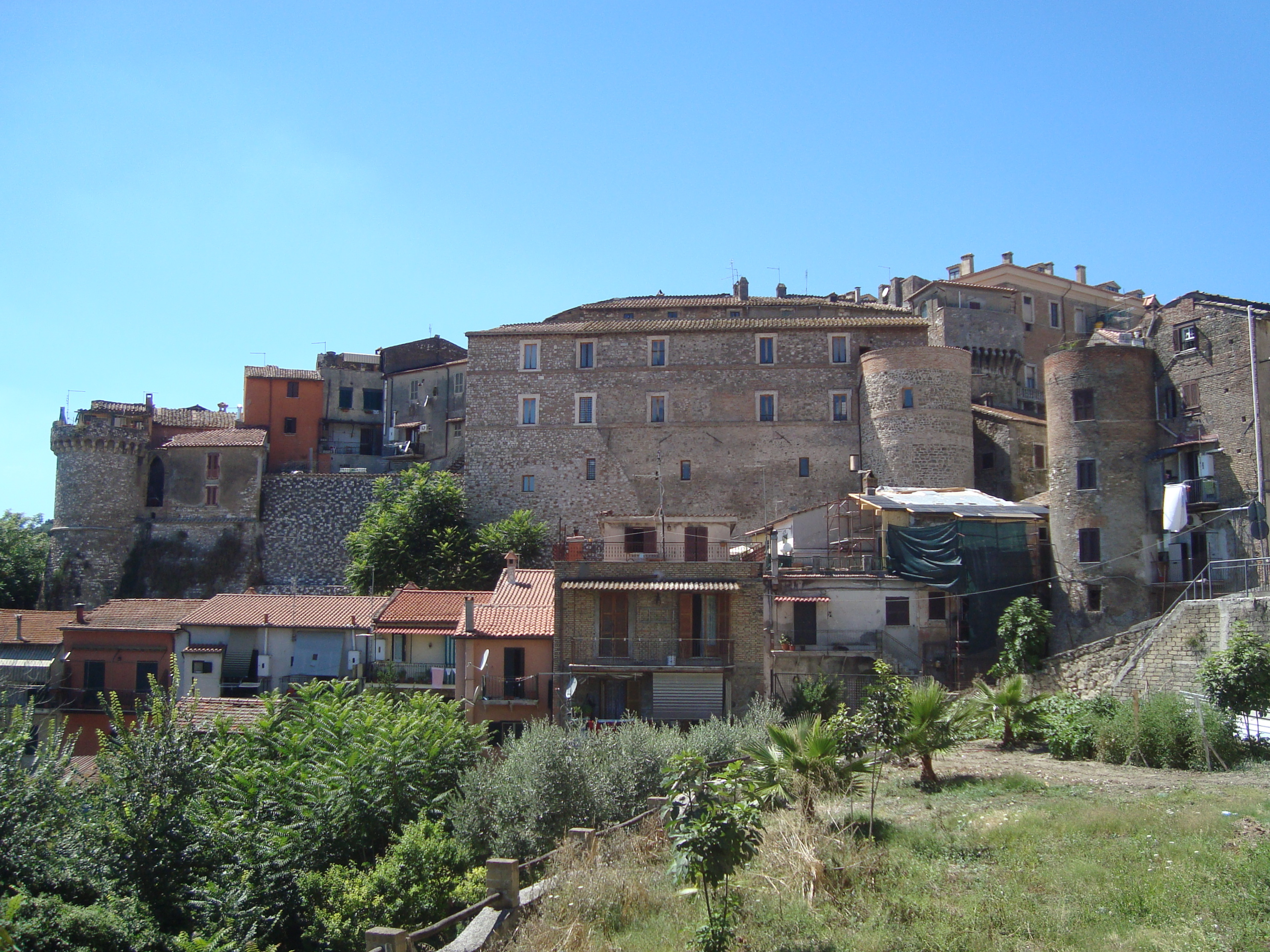
Castle of Nomentum, stronghold of the Crescentii in Sabina.

Despite this setback, the Stefaniani retained their influence in Sabina. In 1003, John inherited Palestrina, while Crescentius resumed the rectorate of Sabina in October 1004, sharing the office with another rector named Rainier II. In 1006, however, the Stefaniani were replaced in the administration of the Sabina by members of the Ottaviani branch. Crescentius may have subsequently served as prefect of Rome. The Stefaniani nevertheless continued to hold extensive territories in the region and to challenge the authority of the Abbey of Farfa. The death of John II Crescentius in 1012 and the accession of Pope Benedict VIII marked a turning point for the Stefaniani. With imperial support, the Counts of Tusculum moved against the family and besieged Crescentius at Bocchignano and his brother John at Palestrina, and then at Tribuco. Both were forced to surrender by the end of 1014, after which they were exiled and their possessions confiscated.

The brothers returned from exile by 1022 and resumed their attacks on Farfa's estates, prompting abbot Hugh to appeal to Emperor Henry II. In that year, the prefecture of Rome held by a member of the Ottaviani branch passed to the pope's brother, Romanus of Tusculum. Crescentius may subsequently have regained the office around 1024, following Romanus's election as Pope John XIX (r. 1024–1032). The brothers' later life is poorly documented. A charter from the Abbey of Subiaco dated 1038 mentions Crescentius and his sons Regetellus, who held the castle of Passerano, and Rainald. Crescentius had largely disappeared from public life by then, and his death is generally placed around 1062. The Stefaniani subsequently disappear from the historical records.

=== House of Ottaviani ===
Crescentius III, son of Octavian, a nobleman who married Rogata, sister of patrician John II Crescentius, became the founder of the Crescentii-Ottaviani branch of the Crescentii family. Octavian was possibly the son of Joseph, a former Rector of Sabina. By 1006, Crescentius III and his brother Otto I had taken over the rectorate of Sabina from the Stefaniani. Their rise was also associated with the expansion of their holdings around the castle of Palombara, where Otto I and his son John established their principal residence. Their expansion may also have extended southwards into Marittima, as suggested by a possible identification with a Crescentius, Duke of Priverno. Towards Campagna, the family strengthened its political and familial ties through the marriage of Rogata's daughter, Marozia, to Gregory, Count of Campagna. They were also associated with the fortification of Vicovaro during the 1000s, where they occupied a position of local power following the decline of the Monastery of Saints Cosmas and Damian. Following Crescentius III's death around 1014, leadership of the house passed to his sons John, Cencius, Rusticus, and Guy. John became the new Rector of Sabina around 1035, a title he held until 1058.

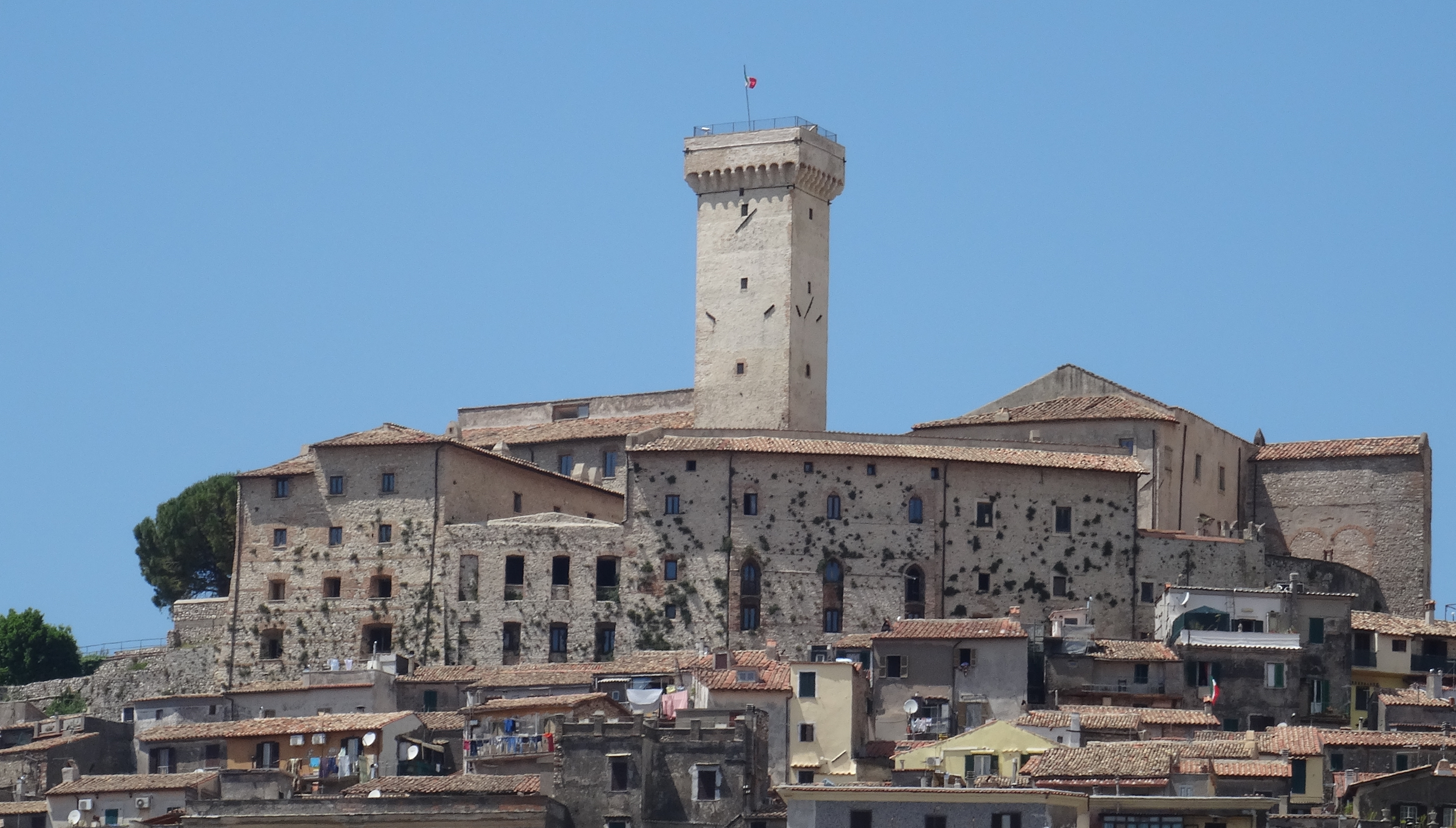
The Savelli-Torlonia Castle of Palombara, built by Otto II and Octavian I.

Traditionally, John was identified as being simultaneously Count of Palombara and Rector of Sabina. In his 1986 work Il dominio dei conti di Palombara Sabina in una ricostruzione dall'XI al XIII secolo, historian Enzo Silvi, however, distinguishes between the hereditary rulers of Palombara and the rectors of Sabina, who governed the region on behalf of the pope, arguing that the two offices were held by different individuals belonging to distinct branches of the Ottaviani family. The distinction between John I of Palombara and John of Sabina is based on the Chronicon Sublacense, which identifies senator Otto I as the father of the former.

==== Ottaviani of Sabina ====
The Ottaviani of Sabina consolidated their influence through the rectorate of Sabina and their involvement in papal politics. In January 1045, John, bishop of Sabina and probably a supporter of the Ottaviani, was elected pope as Sylvester III amid the conflict between the Crescentii and the Counts of Tusculum. However, he was expelled from Rome by the Tusuclan Pope Benedict IX (r. 1032–1048), nephew of John XIX and Benedict VIII, and returned to his diocese in Sabina. Following the Council of Sutri held by Emperor Henry III (r. 1046–1056), he abandoned his claims to the papacy and resumed his episcopal duties.

The Ottaviani of Sabina, now led by Octavian, son of John, later formed an alliance with Count Gregory II of Tusculum, despite their earlier rivalry. In 1058, following the death of Pope Stephen IX (r. 1057–1058), Octavian and Gregory II, along with numerous members of the clergy who were opposed to the reforms being pushed by the German popes and Cardinal Hildebrand, engineered a coup and seized control of Rome. They appointed John of Tusculum, bishop of Velletri and nephew of Gregory II, as Antipope Benedict X. However, the election was challenged by Cardinal Hildebrand and his allies who secured the selection of Gerard of Burgundy as Nicholas II (r. 1059–1061). Benedict X was eventually deposed and his supporters were defeated by Nicholas II after his forces, with the assistance of Robert Guiscard, captured Tusculum and Mentana, forcing Gregory and Octavian to surrender. Nicholas II then introduced several Church reforms, the most significant of which restricted the nobility's role in the selection of bishops, including the pope. Following the death of Sinibald, Rector of Sabina, in 1065, the Ottaviani subsequently retained the rectorate until 1106.

==== Ottaviani of Palombara and Montecelio ====
The Ottaviani of Palombara developed a separate territorial power base centred on their hereditary holdings. In 1062, Otto II of Palombara, son of John I, inherited Montecelio from either his uncle Crescentius, or from Crescentius of the Stefaniani and his two sons, while his brothers Rainier and Octavian I held Marano Equo and Marzolano, respectively. Another brother, John, became abbot John VII of the Abbey of Subiaco, where he served from 1069 until his death in 1121. In 1075 Octavian donated Marzolano to the Abbey of Farfa and renounced his claim to Scandriglia, which he had previously invaded, in order to receive salvation. In 1085, however, he seized Scandriglia again following the death of Count Teudino. He was arrested and forced to renounce the town before a judicial assembly in Rome.

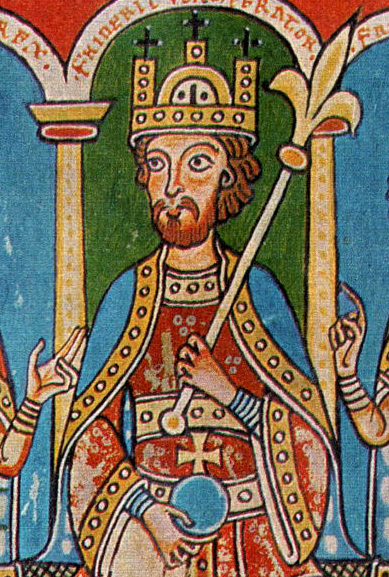
Emperor Frederick I Barbarossa

In 1103, the Ottaviani brothers became embroiled in a further conflict with Farfa over the monastery's right to acquire property in the region. While Octavian initially supported the abbey, Otto II, a supporter of the Ghibellines, claimed that his authority as an imperial count entitled him to control such acquisitions and occupied several settlements. After a brief war, the abbey's forces defeated Otto's army and captured his son John, with Octavian's assistance. Octavian later attempted to reconcile with his brother and promised to kidnap abbot Bernard III, but his betrayal was discovered, forcing him to seek the abbot's forgiveness and pay a fine. The conflict was eventually settled through the arbitration of consul Pier Leoni, who compelled Otto to renounce Palombara in favour of Octavian, while retaining Montecelio.

Under Octavian I's son Otto III the Ottaviani reached the height of their power. Otto consolidated the family's position and established it among the most powerful of the region, successfully navigating the conflicts between the Guelphs and Ghibellines. Around 1115, he captured the fortress of Camerata, held by the Counts of Marsi, with the assistance of abbot Peter III of Subiaco, an achievement subsequently recognised by Pope Paschal II (r. 1099–1118). His younger brother Rainald I also held a minor comital lordship over territories near Riano. Otto's period of prominence came to an end with his death around 1150, after which he was succeeded by his nephew Octavian II and then by the latter's son Otto IV.

Meanwhile, John succeeded his father Otto II as Count of Montecelio. Like his father, he supported the imperial party in its conflicts with the papacy and backed King Conrad III (r. 1138–1152), earning him the nickname Maledictus (the Accursed) in the Liber pontificalis. His son Octavian followed a similar political path, entering the clergy while maintaining close ties with the imperial court. He was appointed cardinal-priest of Santa Cecilia in 1151. In May 1159, Emperor Frederick I Barbarossa (r. 1155–1190) granted Octavian and his brothers the County of Terni. Following the death of Pope Adrian IV (r. 1154–1159), Octavian was elected pope by a minority of cardinals on 7 September 1159, taking the name Victor IV in opposition to Alexander III (r. 1159–1181), who had been elected by the majority. With Barbarossa's support, Victor was recognised by the imperial assembly at Pavia in 1160 and became the emperor's candidate during the ensuing schism. He died on 20 April 1164, but the family's support for the imperial cause continued. In August 1167, Barbarossa appointed John Maledictus as prefect of Rome, using the office to strengthen imperial influence in the city and counter Alexander III's authority. Around 1170, John attempted to acquire Tusculum, offering Count Raino of Tusculum the castle of Montefiascone in exchange. However, the Peace of Anagni in 1176 restored to the papacy the right to appoint the prefect, and John was eventually forced to resign and submit to Alexander III in 1178.

After John's death around 1179, Montecelio passed to his other son Otto. A document from 1185 identifies both Otto of Montecelio and Otto IV of Palombara as kinsmen of Barbarossa. With the emperor's death in 1190, the Ottaviani gradually lost their influence as the Ghibelline faction declined in Latium. Their position improved under Pope Innocent III (r. 1198–1216), who was regarded as a relative of the family. After the two Ottos swore allegiance to the pope, the Ottaviani received several fiefdoms. In 1204, Otto IV's son John II was invested with the town of Montorio Romano, while his other son Otto V strengthened the family's ties with the powerful House of Savelli through marriage. Despite these gains, the Ottaviani continued to decline, and they lost control of Montecelio sometime after 1204. Palombara soon afterwards passed to the Savelli around 1250, when the heirs of Count Rainald II sold the fief to senator Luca Savelli, father of Pope Honorius IV. The town of Moricone, by contrast, remained in the possession of a new cadet branch, which adopted De Palombara as its family name. Its last count, Andrea De Palombara, was forced to sell the fief to the Savelli in 1378.

=== Later history ===
As hereditary surnames became increasingly common during the 13th century, the Ottaviani formally adopted Crescenzi as their family name. Despite losing control of Montecelio and Palombara, the Crescenzi retained several properties in Rome, particularly in the rioni (districts) of Sant'Eustachio and Colonna. Between 1513 and 1741, members of the family held the office of Conservatore of Rome thirty times. The Crescenzi also held important ecclesiastical offices, and several became cardinals. Among them were Marcello Crescenzi, created cardinal in 1542; Pier Paolo Crescenzi, created cardinal in 1611; Alessandro Crescenzi, created cardinal in 1675; and Marcello Crescenzi, created cardinal in 1743. Pier Paolo's brother Giovanni Battista Crescenzi became a prominent painter and architect.

In 1597, Philip II of Spain granted the family the Marquessate of Montorio al Vomano, together with the towns of Rocca Santa Maria and Valle Castellana. A branch of the family, which separated from the main line during the 16th century, was eventually absorbed into the Serlupi family when Franesco Serlupi, son of Livia Crescenzi, was authorised to adopt the double surname of Serlupi Crescenzi by Pope Urban VIII. The Crescenzi became extinct in the late 18th century with the deaths of the brothers Virgilio Crescenzi, the last Marquess of Montorio al Vomano, in 1761, and Cardinal Marcello Crescenzi on 24 August 1768.

== Notable members ==
- Crescentius the Elder
- Crescentius the Younger
- John II Crescentius
- Antipope Victor IV
- Marcello Crescenzi (born 1500)
- Marcello Crescenzi (bishop of Assisi)
- Pier Paolo Crescenzi
- Giovanni Battista Crescenzi
- Alessandro Crescenzi
- Marcello Crescenzi (born 1694)

== Family tree ==
Crescentii family tree

House of Crescentii
Crescentius of the Marble Horse + Unknown	John + Theodora II
John	Theodoranda + Benedict of Sabina (1)	Stephania + Benedict of Sabina (2)	Marozia II + Theopylact (vestiarius)	Crescentius I the Elder + Sergia	Theodora III + John III of Naples
House of Stefaniani	Counts of Tusculum	John I	Crescentius II the Younger + Theodora
John	Crescentius + Unknown	Rogata + Octavian of Sabina	John II
House of Ottaviani

House of Ottaviani
Crescentius III + Theodora	Otto I + Doda	Marozia + Gregory of Campagna
John + Unknown	John I + Davinia
Octavian	Otto II + Juliana	Octavian I + Unknown	Rainier	John VII; Abbot of Subiaco
John; Maledictus + Unknown	Otto III	Rainald I + Unknown
Otto	Octavian; Antipope Victor IV	Octavian II + Unknown
Otto IV + Unknown
John II	Otto V + Unknown Savelli	Rainald II + Unknown
De Palombara	Later Crescenzi

== See also ==
- Counts of Tusculum
- Saeculum obscurum
- Papal appointment
- Sabina (region)
- Mentana

== Sources ==
- Pauler, Roland (2001). "Giovanni XIII, papa". Dizionario Biografico degli Italiani (in Italian). Vol. 55: Ginammi–Giovanni da Crema. Rome: Institute of the Italian Encyclopaedia. ISBN 978-88-12-00032-6.
- West-Harling, Veronica (2025). "The visibility of women in tenth-century Rome". Early Medieval Europe. 33 (4): 522–544. doi:10.1111/emed.12780.
- Romeo, Carlo (1984a). "Crescenzo de Caballo Marmoreo". Dizionario Biografico degli Italiani (in Italian). Vol. 30: Cosattini–Crispolto. Rome: Institute of the Italian Encyclopaedia. ISBN 978-88-12-00032-6.
- Romeo, Carlo (1984b). "Crescenzo". Dizionario Biografico degli Italiani (in Italian). Vol. 30: Cosattini–Crispolto. Rome: Institute of the Italian Encyclopaedia. ISBN 978-88-12-00032-6.
- Arnaldi, Girolamo (1960). "Alberico di Roma". Dizionario Biografico degli Italiani (in Italian). Vol. 1: Aaron–Albertucci. Rome: Institute of the Italian Encyclopaedia. OCLC 883370.
- Romeo, Carlo (1984c). "Crescenzo de Theodora". Dizionario Biografico degli Italiani (in Italian). Vol. 30: Cosattini–Crispolto. Rome: Institute of the Italian Encyclopaedia. ISBN 978-88-12-00032-6.
- Loreti, Eugenio (1987). Guida di Zagarolo. Rome: Tipolito Garofani.
- Romeo, Carlo (1984d). "Crescenzo Nomentano". Dizionario Biografico degli Italiani (in Italian). Vol. 30: Cosattini–Crispolto. Rome: Institute of the Italian Encyclopaedia. ISBN 978-88-12-00032-6.
- Ferracci, Emilio (1998). San Cesareo. Storia di un paese senza storia. Rome: Emilio Ferracci, Emiliano Ilardi, Simone Masini, and Davide Pinn.
- Delogu, Paolo (1971). "Bonifacio VII, papa". Dizionario Biografico degli Italiani (in Italian). Vol. 12: Bonfadini–Borrello. Rome: Institute of the Italian Encyclopaedia. ISBN 978-88-12-00032-6.
- Delogu, Paolo (1966). "Benedetto VII, papa". Dizionario Biografico degli Italiani (in Italian). Vol. 8: Bellucci–Beregan. Rome: Institute of the Italian Encyclopaedia. ISBN 978-88-12-00032-6.
- Di Carpegna Falconieri, Tommaso (2001a). "Giovanni di Crescenzio". Dizionario Biografico degli Italiani (in Italian). Vol. 56: Giovanni Di Crescenzio–Giulietti. Rome: Institute of the Italian Encyclopaedia. ISBN 978-88-12-00032-6.
- Longo, Umberto (2002). "Gregorio di Tuscolo". Dizionario Biografico degli Italiani (in Italian). Vol. 59: Graziano–Grossi Gondi. Rome: Institute of the Italian Encyclopaedia. ISBN 978-88-12-00032-6.
- Huschner, Wolfgang (2001a). "Giovanni XV, papa". Dizionario Biografico degli Italiani (in Italian). Vol. 55: Ginammi–Giovanni da Crema. Rome: Institute of the Italian Encyclopaedia. ISBN 978-88-12-00032-6.
- Huschner, Wolfgang (2001b). "Giovanni XIV". Dizionario Biografico degli Italiani (in Italian). Vol. 55: Ginammi–Giovanni da Crema. Rome: Institute of the Italian Encyclopaedia. ISBN 978-88-12-00032-6.
- Huschner, Wolfgang (2002). "Gregorio V". Dizionario Biografico degli Italiani (in Italian). Vol. 59: Graziano–Grossi Gondi. Rome: Institute of the Italian Encyclopaedia. ISBN 978-88-12-00032-6.
- Canetti, Luigi (2001). "Giovanni XVI, antipapa". Dizionario Biografico degli Italiani (in Italian). Vol. 55: Ginammi–Giovanni da Crema. Rome: Institute of the Italian Encyclopaedia. ISBN 978-88-12-00032-6.
- Falco, Giorgio (1931). "Enciclopedia Italiana (1931) - CRESCENZI". Treccani.
- Tellenbach, Gerd (1966). "Benedetto VIII". Dizionario Biografico degli Italiani (in Italian). Vol. 8: Bellucci–Beregan. Rome: Institute of the Italian Encyclopaedia. ISBN 978-88-12-00032-6.
- Sennis, Antonio (2001a). "Giovanni XVII". Dizionario Biografico degli Italiani (in Italian). Vol. 55: Ginammi–Giovanni da Crema. Rome: Institute of the Italian Encyclopaedia. ISBN 978-88-12-00032-6.
- Sennis, Antonio (2001b). "Giovanni XVIII". Dizionario Biografico degli Italiani (in Italian). Vol. 55: Ginammi–Giovanni da Crema. Rome: Institute of the Italian Encyclopaedia. ISBN 978-88-12-00032-6.
- Sennis, Antonio (2001c). "Sergio IV". Dizionario Biografico degli Italiani (in Italian). Vol. 55: Ginammi–Giovanni da Crema. Rome: Institute of the Italian Encyclopaedia. ISBN 978-88-12-00032-6.
- di Carpegna Falconieri, Tommaso (2001b). "Giuseppe". Dizionario Biografico degli Italiani (in Italian). Vol. 57: Giulini–Gonzaga. Rome: Institute of the Italian Encyclopaedia. ISBN 978-88-12-00032-6.
- Brook, Lindsay Leonard (2003). "Popes and pornocrats: Rome in the early middle ages" (PDF). Foundations. 1 (1). Hereford, UK: Foundation for Medieval Genealogy: 5–21. ISSN 1479-5078.
- Pompili, Franco (1990). Palombara Sabina nel Medioevo. Storia di un piccolo regno. Palombi Editori.
- Sennis, Antonio (2018). "Silvestro III". Dizionario Biografico degli Italiani (in Italian). Vol. 92: Semino–Sisto IV. Rome: Institute of the Italian Encyclopaedia. ISBN 978-88-12-00032-6.
- Capitani, Ovidio (1966). "Benedetto X". Dizionario Biografico degli Italiani (in Italian). Vol. 8: Bellucci–Beregan. Rome: Institute of the Italian Encyclopaedia. ISBN 978-88-12-00032-6.
- di Carpegna Falconieri, Tommaso (2001c). "Giovanni". Dizionario Biografico degli Italiani (in Italian). Vol. 55: Ginammi–Giovanni da Crema. Rome: Institute of the Italian Encyclopaedia. ISBN 978-88-12-00032-6.
- Silvi, Enzo (1986). Il dominio dei conti di Palombara Sabina in una ricostruzione dall'XI al XIII secolo. Tivoli: Società Tiburtina di Storia e d'Arte.
- Censi, Giovanni (1971). Gerano tra Tivoli e Subiaco dalle origini al 1169. Tivoli: Società Tiburtina di Storia e d'Arte.
- Berardozzi, Antonio (2013). I Prefetti. Una dinastia signorile tra impero e papato (secoli XII-XV). Rome: Società romana di storia patria. ISBN 978-88-97808-39-8.
- Piazza, Andrea (2020). "Vittore IV, antipapa". Dizionario Biografico degli Italiani (in Italian). Vol. 99: Verrazzano–Vittorio Amedeo. Rome: Institute of the Italian Encyclopaedia. ISBN 978-88-12-00032-6.
- Leondi, Sergio (2019). Le Regole di un Popolo - Moricone e i suoi antichi Statuti. Università Agraria di Moricone.
- Crescenzi Romani, Giovanni Pietro (1642). Della nobiltà d'Italia overo compendio delle istorie delle famiglie illustri. Vol. II. Bologna: Nicolò Tebaldini.
- Bertoni, Luisa (1984). "Crescenzi, Marcello". Dizionario Biografico degli Italiani (in Italian). Vol. 30: Cosattini–Crispolto. Rome: Institute of the Italian Encyclopaedia. ISBN 978-88-12-00032-6.
- Polverini Fosi, Irene (1984a). "Crescenzi, Marcello". Dizionario Biografico degli Italiani (in Italian). Vol. 30: Cosattini–Crispolto. Rome: Institute of the Italian Encyclopaedia. ISBN 978-88-12-00032-6.
- Polverini Fosi, Irene (1984b). "Crescenzi, Pier Paolo". Dizionario Biografico degli Italiani (in Italian). Vol. 30: Cosattini–Crispolto. Rome: Institute of the Italian Encyclopaedia. ISBN 978-88-12-00032-6.
- Polverini Fosi, Irene (1984c). "Crescenzi, Alessandro Cosimo". Dizionario Biografico degli Italiani (in Italian). Vol. 30: Cosattini–Crispolto. Rome: Institute of the Italian Encyclopaedia. ISBN 978-88-12-00032-6.
- Baglione, Giovanni (1733) [1641]. Le Vite de' Pittori, Scultori, Architetti, ed Intagliatori dal Pontificato di Gregorio XII del 1572. fino a' tempi de Papa Urbano VIII. nel 1642 [Lives of the painters, sculptors, architects, and engravers during the papacies of Gregory XII in 1572 to Urban VIII in 1642]. Naples: Giovanni Battista Passari.
- Blasi, Bruno (1980). "Il palazzo del marchese" (PDF). Società Tarquiniense d'Arte e Storia (9).
