= Monteflavio =

- Comune
- Comune di Monteflavio
- Coat of arms

- Location within Italy Location within Lazio
- Coordinates: 42°7′N 12°50′E
- Country: Italy
- Region: Lazio
- Metropolitan city: Rome (RM)

Government
  - Mayor: Lanfranco Ferrante

Area
  - Total: 17.2 km^{2} (6.6 sq mi)
- Elevation: 800 m (2,600 ft)

Population (30 November 2017)
  - Total: 1,289
  - Density: 74.9/km^{2} (194/sq mi)
- Demonym: Monteflaviesi
- Time zone: UTC+1 (CET)
  - Summer (DST): UTC+2 (CEST)
- Postal code: 00010
- Dialing code: 0774
- Patron saint: Assumption of Mary
- Saint day: August 15
- Website: Official website

Monteflavio (Romanesco: Montefraviu) is a comune (municipality) in the Metropolitan City of Rome in the Italian region of Latium, located about 35 kilometres (22 miles) northeast of Rome.

Monteflavio borders the following municipalities: Licenza, Montorio Romano, Moricone, Palombara Sabina, San Polo dei Cavalieri, Scandriglia.

== Culture ==
During the "Polenta" Festival (2nd Sunday in October) it is possible to eat the polenta (the thick maize porridge) with new wines pouring out by stands in the streets and in the main square of Monteflavio.
