= Borgo Santa Maria =

Borgo Santa Maria may refer to:

- Borgo Santa Maria, Latina, a village in the province of Latina, Italy
- Borgo Santa Maria, Montelibretti, a village in the metropolitan city of Rome, Italy
- Borgo Santa Maria, Pesaro, a village in the province of Pesaro, Italy
- Borgo Santa Maria Immacolata, a village in the province of Teramo, Italy
