= List of World War II prisoner-of-war camps in Italy =

There were 80 Axis prisoner-of-war camps in Italy during World War II. The full title of an Italian Prisoner of war camp was Campo di Concentramento per Prigionieri di Guerra, which translates as Concentration Camp for Prisoners of War. This title is often shortened to P.G. (prisoners of war) followed by the number of the camp and its name. For example, P.G. 59 Servigliano. With the declaration of the Italian Armistice on 8 September 1943 Italian administration of the camps was ended. Those located behind the front line in northern and central Italy were taken over by the occupying German forces and used as transit holding camps for both prisoners taken during the Italian Campaign and recaptured escapees awaiting transfer to the Stalags in Germany and German-occupied territories .

== List of POW camps ==
Camp	Location	Notes
German
Dulag 226	Pissignano, Campello sul Clitunno	Originally designated "C.C. 77" and then P.G. 77 by the Italian Army. After the Armistice the Germans used this as a transit camp and renamed it Dulag 226. P See P.G. 77 below.
Dulag 339	Mantua	Formerly 337, elsewhere listed as a stalag. Distinct from P.G. 339 below
Stalag 339	Trieste	Distinct from P.G. 339 below
Italian
Mari camp no.1	Manziana	to the west of Lake Bracciano, province of Rome. Interrogation camp for submariners.
San Valentino	Poggio Mirteto in the province of Rieti	Interrogation camp for aviators in a convent. One of the detainees was David Westheimer.
P.G. 5	Gavi-Serravalle Scrivia Piedmont	Some 20 miles (32 km) north of Genoa, the camp was turned over to the Germans when the Italians capitulated. However, for 24 hours, obeying an order of the War Office, the British POW senior officer refused to allow prisoners to attempt an escape. Three days later, J. E. S. Tooes, a Royal Navy submariner, was able to escape when on an outside work detail. Claimed to be the only Gavi fort prisoner ever to escape in 800 years, he crossed into Switzerland in four days.
P.G. 10	Acquapendente in the province of Viterbo	
P.G. 12	Vincigliata Candeli	Main article: Vincigliata A 13th-century castle near Florence, used to hold about 25 high-rank prisoners, notably several British generals including Major-General Sir Adrian Carton de Wiart, Air-Marshal Owen Tudor Boyd, Lt-Gen. Richard O'Connor, Lt-Gen. Philip Neame, and New Zealand Brigadiers Reginald Miles and James Hargest. There were several escape attempts—one successful with six officers through a tunnel, four being caught soon after. Brig. Miles and Hargest escaped to Switzerland, but only Hargest eventually escaped to England via Spain. After the Italian Armistice in September 1943, 11 officers and 14 other ranks escaped with Italian partisan and SOE help. Most officers made the Allied lines, whilst many NCOs and other ranks were rounded up by the Germans and consigned to camps in Germany until the end of the war.
P.G. 17	Rezzanello	Near Piacenza
P.G. 19	Bologna	A camp for officers.
P.G. 21	Chieti	An old convent used as a camp for about 1300 officers. After the Armistice, anybody wishing to leave the camp was forcibly prevented from doing so by the orders of the Senior British Officer who was following to the letter the orders of Allied HQ to remain in the camp and await the arrival of Allied forces. Consequently, the Germans were able to capture them all. They were subsequently transferred to P.G. 78 [Sulmona] and thence to camps in Germany where they remained until the end of the war.
P.G. 23	Vestone near Brescia	
P.G. 26	Cortemaggiore	Piacenza
P.G. 27	San Romano	Pisa
P.G. 29	Veano	Piacenza
P.G. 32	Bogliaco	Lake Garda near Salò, Brescia
P.G. 35	Certosa di Padula	Monastery, near Salerno
P.G. 38	Poppi	Monastery near Arezzo, Tuscany
P.G. 41	Montalbo Hilltop 15th Century castle near Piacenza.	Held about 300 Allied prisoners, 280 officers and 20 other ranks between 1941 and 1943. In March 1943 the castle was seized by German command when the prisoners were moved to P.G. 49 Fontanellato
P.G. 43	Garessio	Cuneo
P.G. 47	Modena	Officers, mainly from New Zealand
P.G. 49	Fontanellato	Orphanage near Parma. For 500 Allied officers and 100 other ranks. The first to escape were Lt Michael Ross and Lt Jimmy Day of the WELCH Regiment on 7 May 1943 by hiding in a trench dug in the exercise area. They were recaptured after 10 days in Como near the Swiss Border. After the armistice all 600 men, including Eric Newby and Richard Carver, marched out with the connivance of the Italian commandant and guards an hour before the Germans arrived, thanks to the decision by the Commandant, Colonel Eugenio Vicedomini, to open the gates the day after the Armistice of 8 September 1943.
P.G.50	Rome	In a military barracks, The Caserma Macao, known as the Caserma Genova Cavalleria.A transit camp for officers
P.G. 51	Altamura Villa Serena	45 km from Bari - Transit camp
P.G. 52	Pian di Coreglia also known as Chiavari	About 15 kilometres (9.3 mi) inland from Chiavari, on the northern edge of a small town called Calvari on the banks of the Lavagna River, near Pian de Coreglia. Mounted on the side of the bridge is a marble slab erected in 2002, commemorating the site.
P.G. 53	Macerata	Referred to in Italian documents as Urbisaglia Macerata and by Prisoners of War in their Liberation Reports as Macerata, it is also known as Sforzacosta, not to be confused with P.G. 56 Sforzacosta. A large camp, situated in the small town of Sforzacosta iin the province of Macerata. Projected in July 1942 with a capacity of 12,000 prisoners on the site of a disused linen factory at Casette Verdini. Postal address 3300. The camp was located about 1 mile (1.6 km) from the railway station near Urbisaglia, today called Urbisaglia-Sforzacosta. In addition to the buildings of the former linen mill, which housed about 2,000 men per floor, other barracks were built in the southeast corner of the site. As pointed out in the 1943 camp inspection carried out by the Protecting Power, The International Red Cross, the camp had poor sanitation facilities: one source refers to just 12 toilets and 3 taps. The commander, a colonel who had participated in the fascist "March on Rome" on 28 October 1922, had under his command a number of elderly officers, sentries, dogs, Carabinieri, and two interpreters. Despite lying only 140 metres above sea level, winters were cold.
P.G. 54	Passo Corese known as Fara in Sabina	In the Commune of Montelibretti. 35 km (22 mi) from Rome. According to statistics published by the SMRE (Stato Maggiore dell'Esercito Italiano) held in the State Archives in Rome, on 30 November 1942 the camp housed lower-ranked prisoners - 2,374 British and 1,361 South African prisoners along with 10 prisoners of various nationalities, many captured following the surrender of Tobruk, were initially held in two compounds of tents. with very poor conditions and food shortages. Barracks, many of which are still in existence and now form the nucleus of a settlement called Borgo Santa Maria, were constructed at a later date. Many prisoners escaped into the Apennine Mountains when guards deserted after the Italian Armistice was announced on 8 September 1943. It was then taken over by the Germans who used it as a transit camp for recaptured escapers and men taken prisoner during the allied advance in Italy in the autumn of 1943. It was completely evacuated in January 1944 ahead of this advance. The 1,100 British, South African and American prisoners of war were put on a train to be taken to a camp in Germany. On 28 January 1944, they were crossing the Orvieto Railroad Bridge North in Allerona, Umbria, when the American 320th Bombardment Group arrived to bomb the bridge. Unaware that there were Allied prisoners on the train, they dropped their bombs on their targets. The Germans left the prisoners locked in the boxcars and fled. Approximately half the men were killed by the bombs, or when the cars ultimately tumbled into the river below.
P.G. 55	Busseto	Near Parma. The headquarters of this camp were in the town of Busseto in the stables of the Palazzo Pallavicini from where the six dependent labour camps were adminiistered.
P.G. 56	Sforzacosta	This tented camp was closed down in September 1942 following flooding and was never reopened.
P.G. 57	Grupignano	Near Udine, at Cividale del Friuli. Mostly Australian and New Zealand other ranks
P.G. 59	Servigliano	Fermo According to statistics published by the SMRE (Stato Maggiore dell'Esercito Italiano) held in the State Archives in Rome, in December1942 the camp capacity was 2,000 which had risen to 3,000 by March 1943, though the maximum number was reached in December 1942 when 2,012 prisoners were present - 690 British, 11 Australian, 15 Canadian, 1 white and 13 Black or mixed race South AFrican, 45 Cypriot, 4 French De Gaullists, 416 American and 13 others.For detailed information see the camp 59 survivors website.
P.G. 60	Colle di Compito (de:Colle di Compito)	Near the city of Lucca, in the comune of Capannori in the province of Lucca. Conditions were reported to be very bad in this camp from late 1941-late 1942. Overcrowded tents, swampy land, mosquitoes, dysentery, heat, no Red Cross Parcels, meagre water supply. Many prisoners were moved to other camps before winter set in. The camp housed more than 3,000 British and Commonwealth prisoners of war over the period of its existence. A group of about 1,000 black South African prisoners were present in September 1943 having being transferred there from P.G.85 Tuturano in August.Two days after the Italian Armistice on 8 September 1943, a German military column from the Tassignano airfield arrived at the camp and demanded that it be handed over. Camp Commander Col Vincenzo Cione, explaining that he had received no such orders, refused to do so, whereupon German soldiers opened fire, killing the Colonel, his second-in-command Captain Massimo Felice and a camp guard named Domenico Mastrippolito. In the confusion that followed this atrocity prisoners fled en masse. Local people who had suffered wartime deprivation then looted the camp. The camp was re-established as an internment camp with wooden huts before the end of 1943 and in the early part of 1944 it was used as a detention centre for anti-fascists, civilian prisoners, Jews and foreign citizens, then later abandoned.
P.G. 62	Grumello del Piano	Near Bergamo. Mostly Indians and Cypriots. Seven satellite work camps, including Gamba, Cremona and Torbole
P.G. 63	Carinaro Near Caserta	On 30 September 1942 the camp held 600 prisoners of whom there were 2 British, 7 Australians, 252 South Africans and 339 Indians, but by the end of October all but the Indian contingent had been fransferred elsewhere.
P.G. 64	Colfiorito	[In Umbria]] A prisoner of war camp which was converted into an internment camp.
P.G. 65	Gravina in Puglia.	The camp was situated between Gravina in Puglia and Altamura in the region of Puglia, southern Italy.
P.G. 66	Capua	Transit camp.
P.G. 68	Vetralla	According to information held by the SMRE (Stato Maggiore dell'Esercito Italiano) held in the State Archives in Rome, in December 1942 the camp was emptied and the prisoners redistributed as follows - 850 to P.G.52, 500 to P.G.73, 500 to P.G. 57, 500 to P.G.70, 500 to P.G. 65, 200 to act as a workforce in construction P.G.10 Acquapendente.
P.G. 70	Monteurano	NearFermo,the camp had a max capacity of 8.000 prisoners. The PG70 was located near the station Monturano-Rapagnano of the Porto San Giorgio-Amandola railway (later decommissioned), in the Marche region of central Italy. At first, it was a linen factory afterwards being was converted into a prisoner of war camp. At the end of World War II, it was used to accommodate Dalmatian and Istrian refugees.
P.G. 71	Aversa	Near Naples
P.G. 73	Fossoli di Carpi	Near Modena
P.G. 75	Torre Tresca Bari	Transit camp. One work camp.
P.G. 77	Pissignano, Campello sul Clitunno	According to statistics published by the SMRE (Stato Maggiore dell'Esercito Italiano) held in the State Archives in Rome, on 30 September 1942 the camp held 168 British and 40 South African prisoners. On 28 February 1943 it held 221 prisoners, all French De Gaullists. In March the number had risen to 1.372 of whom 6 were British, 22 South African and 1,344 French De Gaullists. Prisoners were accommodated in military tents and suffered from disease and harsh conditions throughout the winter of 1942. In addition to the prisoners of war, from December 1942 onwards it was used as a transit camp for Albanians and Montenegrins, all of whom were civilian internees and would be sent on from there to P.G. 64 Colfiorito. After the Armistice [8 September 1943] the camp fell under German command and became a transit camp Dulag 226. It was abandoned on 8 February 1944.
P.G. 78	Sulmona	Camp 78 at Sulmona served as a POW camp in both world wars. During World War I, it housed Austrian prisoners captured in the Isonzo and Trentino campaigns; during World War II, it contained as many as 3,000 British and Commonwealth officers and other ranks captured in North Africa. This camp remained intact as of 2003. In September 1943, as the Italian government neared collapse, the inmates of Sulmona heard rumours that the evacuation of the camp was imminent. They awoke one morning to discover that their guards had deserted. On 14 September, German troops arrived to escort the prisoners northwards, to captivity in Germany, but not before hundreds of them had escaped into the hills. One such escapee was the South African author, Uys Krige, who described his experience in a book titled The Way Out (1946). The nearby Villa Orsini was used to house senior British and Commonwealth officers including; Major-General Sir Adrian Carton de Wiart, Lieutenant General Sir Philip Neame, Air Marshal Boyd, General Sir Richard Nugent O'Connor, Brigadier Reginald Miles and Brigadier James Hargest. Camp 78/1 at Acquafredda was a work camp with, in 1943, approximately 250 New Zealanders, 50 South Africans and several English soldiers. It was sited approximately 2000 ft above sea level.
P.G. 80	Villa Marina	Near Rome
P.G. 82	Laterina	Near Arezzo, [Tuscany]. According to statistics published by the SMRE (Stato Maggiore dell'Esercito Italiano) held in the State Archives in Rome, on 30 September 1942 the camp held 2,372 prisoners. On 30 June 1943,3,317 were present. Another source indicates that 50% escaped, quoting a figure of 2,720 recorded in a secret Italian army document SMRE Stato Maggiore dell'Esercito Italiano). After the armistice on 8 September the German forces used Laterina as a transit camp.
P.G. 83	Fiume	
P.G. 85	Tuturano In Puglia	Transit camp.
P.G. 87	Cardoncelli Near Benevento	31 miles north-east of Naples, capacity 4,000 prisoners.According to information published by the SMRE (Stato Maggiore dell'Esercito Italiano) held in the State Archives in Rome, when in November 1942 the camp was closed down for the winter 493 prisoners were sent to P.G.52, 2,000 to P.G.66 and another 2,000 to an unspecified destination.
P.G. 89	Gonars	Udine
P.G. 91	Avezzano	
P.G. 97	Renicci di Anghiari	Province of Arezzo, Tuscany. This was principally an internment camp.
P.G. 98	San Giuseppe Jato	Sicily
P.G. 102	Aquila	Transit camp
P.G. 103	Treviso	The Monigo concentration camp, housed in a suburban military barracks, was first occupied by Slovenian and Croatian civilian prisoners but a subsection designated as Camp 103 later accommodated a few hundred South African and New Zealand POWs captured at the fall of Tobruk. Camp 103/6 at Ampezzo was a small subsidiary camp where prisoners worked at the construction of a hydroelectric plant. Prisoners at nearby Camp 103/7, Sauris, near La Maina, among the Dolomites, also worked at the hydroelectric plant.
P.G. 106	Vercelli	This was ade up of some 25 work camps, mostly housing Australians and New Zealanders. Satellite 106/20 was located at Salussola which was then in the province of Vercelli.
P.G. 107	Torviscosa	Udine - A collection of work camps including 107/2 (Prati), 107/4 (San Donà di Piave), 107/5 (Torre di Confine), and 107/7 (La Salute di Livenza). Mostly New Zealanders and South Africans
P.G. 110	Carbonia	In Sardinia, Italy
P.G. 112	Turin	This work camp was made up of 5 satellite camps for British prisoners of war - at Ponte Stura, La Màndria, Gassino, Spineto and Beinasco - and a 6th for prisoners taken by the Italians in the Balkans.
P.G. 113	Avio in the province of Trento	
P.G. 115	Morgnano	A work camp based at Morgnano near Spoleto with a branch P.G. 115/5 at a brickworks in Marsciano Perugia
P.G. 118	Prato all'Isarco	Near Bolzano
P.G. 120	Chiesanuova, Padua	Comprising a collection of work camps including Camp 120/5 (Abano Terme) and 120/8 (Fogolana). Other locations included Fattoria Bianco and Cetona,
P.G. 122	Cinecittà	Near Rome - several work camps.
P.G. 127	Locano Canavese	Aosta
P.G. 129	Montelupone	Macerata
P.G. 132	Foggia	
P.G. 133	Novara	In Piedmont Organised into work camps.
P.G. 136 C.A.R.E	Bologna	
P.G. 145	Campotosto, Montorio al Vomano	(Province of Teramo)
P.G. 146	Mortara	This camp had over 30 work camps.
P.G. 148	Bussolengo near Verona	In Italian sources named as Pol di Pastrengo. Labour camp for 250 prisoners, mostly New Zealanders, but also British, South Africans, Americans, Indians, and Egyptians. 14 satellite work camps at Isola della Scala, Lazise, Mozzecane, Vigasio at San Bernardino, Montecchia di Crosara at the Cava Basalti quarry, Legnago/Vangadizza at Rosta, Zevio at Villa da Lisca, San Martino Buon Albergo, Bonavigo, Oppeano in the Mazzantica Village, Mozzecane near the church, Angiari. Closed following the mass outbreak of prisoners in the days after the Italian Armistice was announced on 8 September 1943.
P.G. 201	Bergamo	Hospital in an almshouse
P.G. 202	Lucca	Hospital in a former civilian hospital.
P.G. 203	Bologna	Hospital in Castel San Pietro
P.G. 204	Altamura	Hospital in a school
P.G. 206	Nocera	Hospital near Rovello
P.G. 207	Milan	Hospital

== In film ==
- Von Ryan's Express
