= Montorio Romano =

- Comune
- Comune di Montorio Romano
- Coat of arms

- Location within Italy Location within Lazio
- Coordinates: 42°8′N 12°48′E
- Country: Italy
- Region: Lazio
- Metropolitan city: Rome (RM)

Government
  - Mayor: Vincenzo Ponzani

Area
  - Total: 23.0 km^{2} (8.9 sq mi)
- Elevation: 575 m (1,886 ft)

Population (31 December 2014)
  - Total: 2,004
  - Density: 87.1/km^{2} (226/sq mi)
- Demonym: Montoriani
- Time zone: UTC+1 (CET)
  - Summer (DST): UTC+2 (CEST)
- Postal code: 00010
- Dialing code: 0774

Montorio Romano (Romanesco: Mondoriu) is a comune (municipality) in the Metropolitan City of Rome in the Italian region of Latium, located about 35 kilometres (22 mi) northeast of Rome.

Montorio Romano borders the following municipalities: Monteflavio, Montelibretti, Moricone, Nerola, Scandriglia.
