= Montelibretti =

- Comune
- Comune di Montelibretti
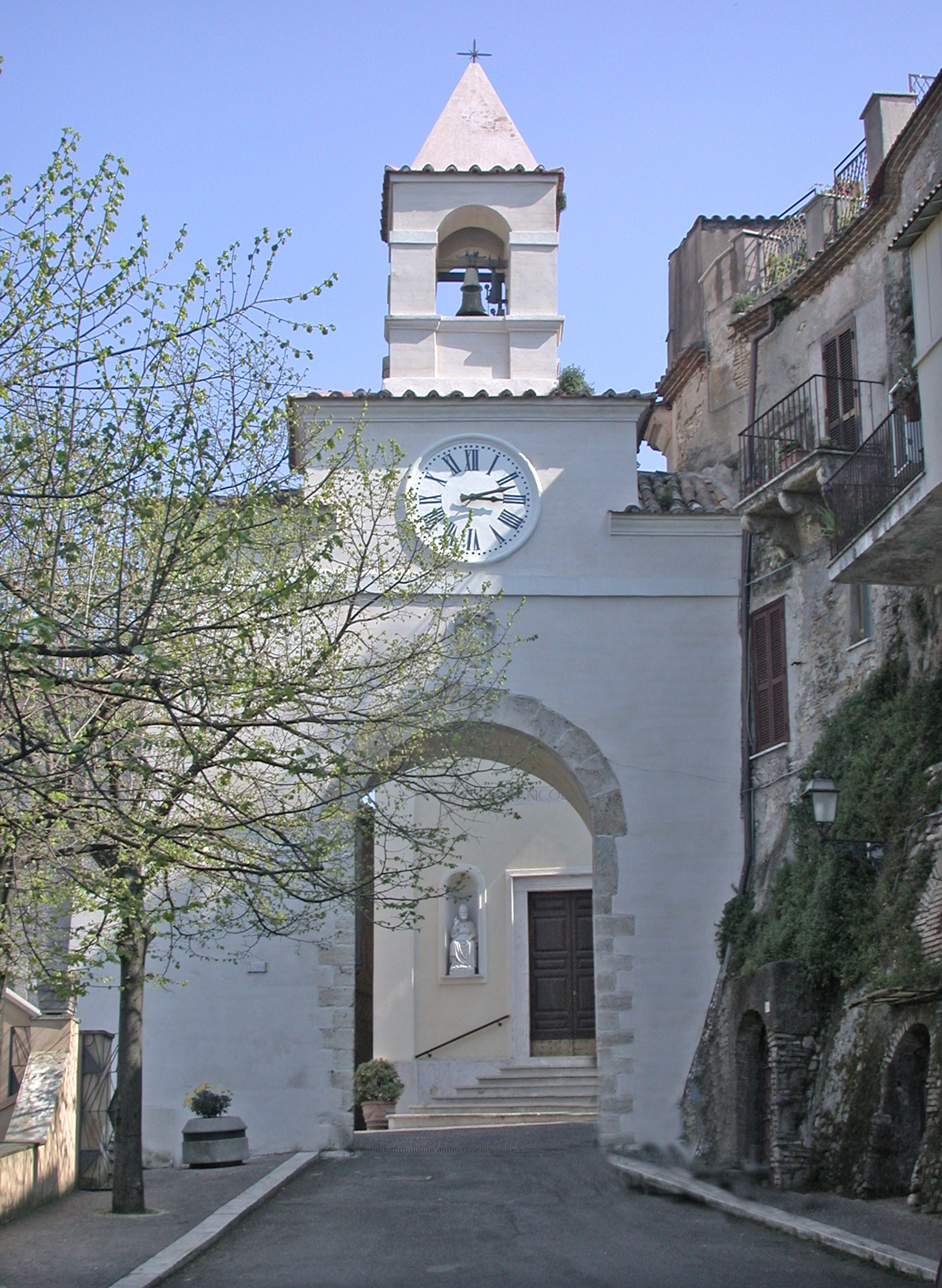
- Church of San Nicola di Bari, Montelibretti

- Coat of arms

- Location within Italy Location within Lazio
- Coordinates: 42°8′N 12°44′E
- Country: Italy
- Region: Lazio
- Metropolitan city: Rome (RM)
- Frazioni: Pianabella di Montelibretti, Passo Corese (together with the comune of Fara in Sabina), Borgo Santa Maria, Montemaggiore

Government
  - Mayor: Luca Branciani

Area
  - Total: 44.0 km^{2} (17.0 sq mi)
- Elevation: 232 m (761 ft)

Population (30 November 2017)
  - Total: 5,311
  - Density: 121/km^{2} (313/sq mi)
- Demonym: Montelibrettesi
- Time zone: UTC+1 (CET)
  - Summer (DST): UTC+2 (CEST)
- Postal code: 00010
- Dialing code: 0774
- Patron saint: St. Nicholas of Bari, Blessed Virgin of Carmine
- Saint day: May 9 and 10, 2nd Saturday in October
- Website: Official website

Montelibretti is a town and comune (municipality) in the Metropolitan City of Rome in the Italian region of Lazio, located about 30 kilometres (19 mi) northeast of Rome on the slopes of Monti Sabini.

Montelibretti borders the following municipalities: Capena, Fara in Sabina, Fiano Romano, Monterotondo, Montopoli di Sabina, Montorio Romano, Moricone, Nerola, Palombara Sabina. The hamlet Borgo Santa Maria is a part of the town administratively.

== History ==
The name derives from the presence of a Roman villa owned by Caius Brutius Presentis, Commodus' father-in-law. In the Middle Ages, starting from the 15th century, it was a fortress of the Orsini, who were succeeded by the Barberini and then by the Sciarra.

In 1867 it was the location of a battle between Garibaldine and Papal troops, in the course of the Battle of Mentana.

== Main sights ==
- Parish church of St. Nicholas
- Barberini Palace, built over a castle of the Orsini
- Necropolis of Colle del Forno (7th century BC), attributed to the Sabini town of Eretum
