= Dwight Benton =

American painter

Dwight Benton (New York City, September 9, 1834 – April 7, 1903) was an American painter and writer, who resided for decades in Rome.

He learned painting in the United States, painting landscapes and cityscapes of the midwest. He became an expatriate and painted watercolor landscapes, including of the Protestant Cemetery in Rome, but also vedute of the Sabina, or the areas around Olevano and Subiaco. He also painted Veduta dell'Isola di Capri. he published a journal entitled The Roman World.
