= Santa Maria delle Grazie, Scandriglia =

Roman Catholic Church in Scandriglia, Italy

Coordinates: 42°09′20″N 12°48′59″E

The Sanctuary of Santa Maria delle Grazie is a Roman Catholic church and Franciscan convent located in the frazione of Ponticelli within the town limits of Scandriglia, province of Rieti, region of Lazio, Italy. It is presently still a Franciscan monastery, with support of the Fondo Edifici di Culto of the Interior Ministry.

== History and description ==
The convent was completed in 1478 under the patronage of Raimondo Orsini, Duke of Gravina and Count of Neroli, in gratitude for the recuperation of his ill son by interventions of the franciscan blessed Amadeo Menezes de Sylva. Located in Ponticelli Sabino, the place was also chosen due to the presence of a venerated 15th-century icon of the Madonna and child (Santa Maria delle Grazie), derived from the nearby Castello di Neroli. For a convent under Amedeo, Orsini obtained recognition by Pope Sixtus IV in 1478. In 1568, the "Amedeite" friars were suppressed, and the convent incorporated friars from the main order in Rome.

The convent was suppressed in 1810, and again in 1860. It suffered from an earthquake in 1826. In 1882, the property was ceded to the commune and sold. The church was deconsecrated in 1888 to 1891. It was looted by the Garibaldini in 1867.

The single nave is spanned by Gothic arches. The interior shelters the 14th-century venerated icon of the Madonna and child. In the refectory is a fresco of the Crucifixion attribute to Lorenzo da Viterbo. The adjacent cloister has been extensively restored.
