= Duomo di Sant'Antonio Martire, Fara in Sabina =

Church in Fara in Sabina, Italy

Coordinates: 42°12′33″N 12°43′45″E

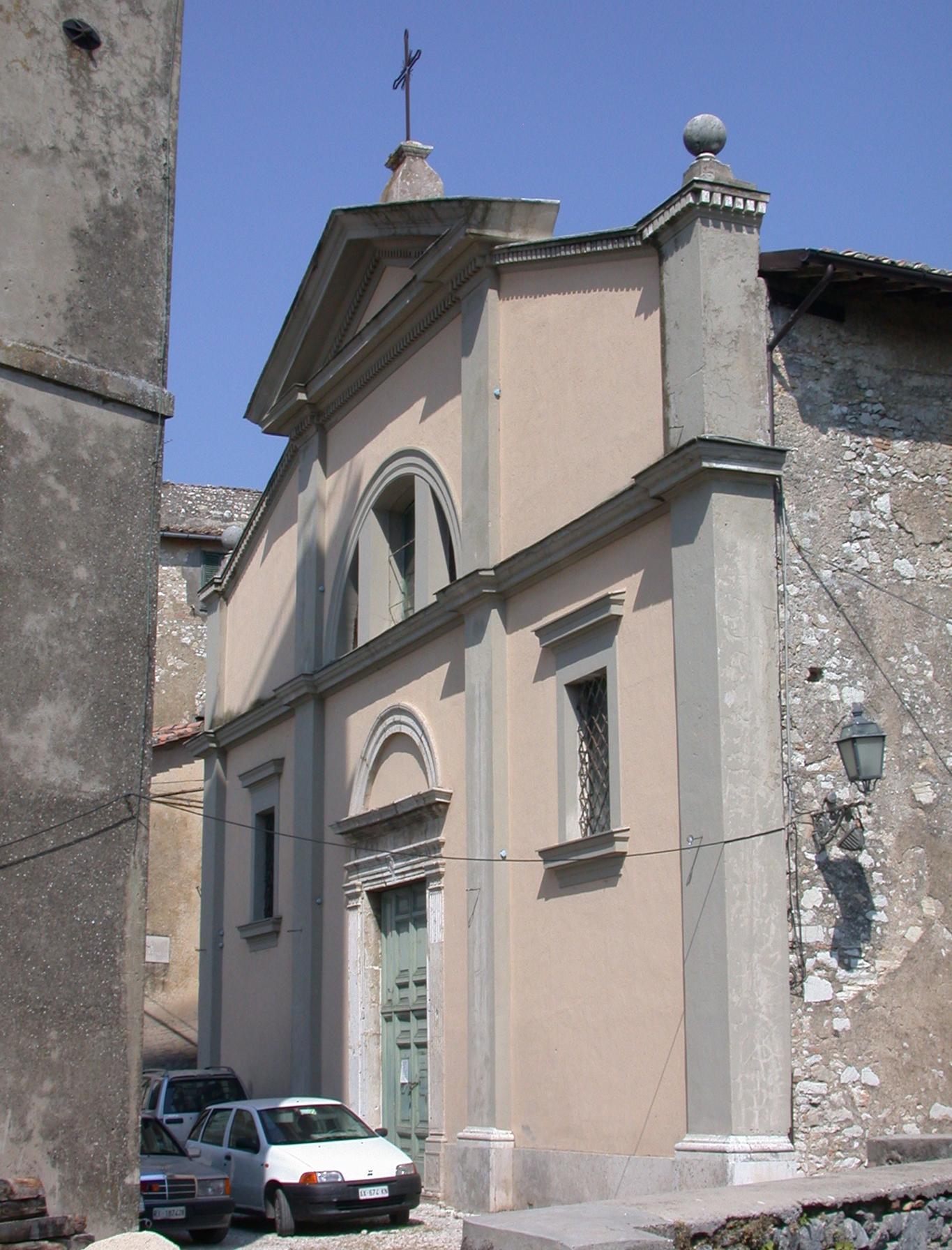

Sant'Antonio Martire is the main Roman Catholic church, or duomo, in the town of Fara in Sabina, in the province of Rieti, region of Lazio, Italy.

== History ==
Construction of this church began in the 13th-century on the site of a small, castle-associated church called Santa Maria in Castello. The church has undergone various restorations over the centuries, and its facade now has an eclectic, neoclassical style. In prior centuries, the church was owned by the nearby Abbey of Farfa and was elevated to a collegiate church. The Romanesque style multi-level bell tower, with its mullioned windows, stands apart from the main building.

The interior contains a canvas depicting St Anne and the Virgin (Education of the Virgin) by Vincenzo Manenti, as well as a Crucifixion with the Virgin and St John attributed to followers of Guido Reni. The wooden tabernacle on the main altar was designed by Vignola. The church has a curious crucifix, fashioned in the East using human hair, and houses a silver processional cross and wooden icon statue of Sant'Antonio in the sacristy.
