= Passo Corese =

- Frazione
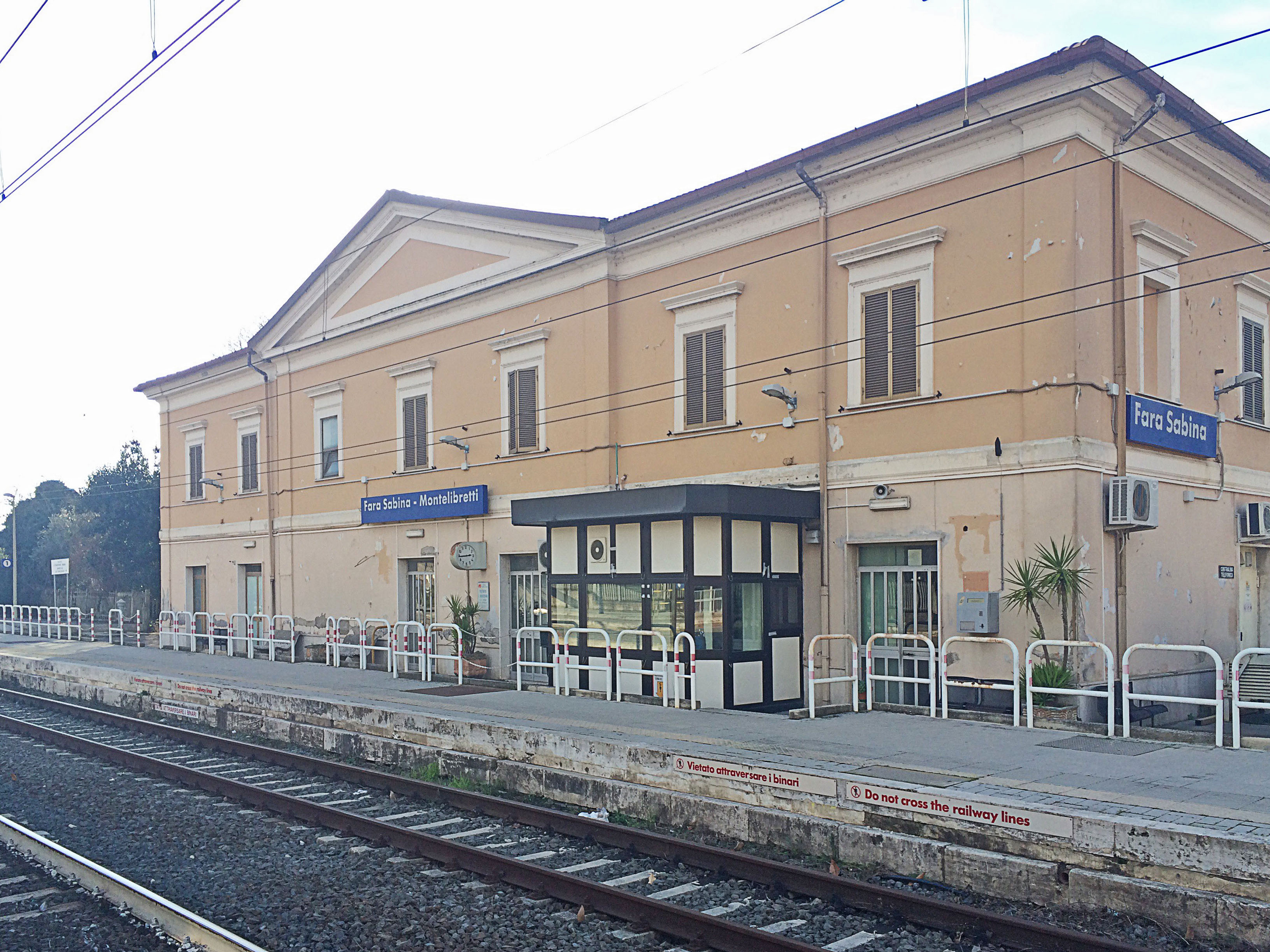
- Fara Sabina-Montelibretti station

- Location of Passo Corese in Italy
- Coordinates: 42°9′25″N 12°39′10″E
- Country: Italy
- Region: Lazio
- Province: Rieti (RI)
- Comune: Fara in Sabina
- Elevation: 53 m (174 ft)

Population (2011)
  - Total: 3,573
- Demonym: Coresini
- Time zone: UTC+1 (CET)
  - Summer (DST): UTC+2 (CEST)
- Postal code: 02032
- Dialing code: (+39) 0765
- Patron saint: St. Cross
- Saint day: 14 September

Passo Corese is an Italian town and hamlet (frazione) of Fara in Sabina, a municipality in the province of Rieti, Lazio. In 2011 it had a population of 3,573.

== History ==
=== Early history ===
Close to Passo Corese is the site of Cures Sabinorum, also called simply Cures. According to Roman historians, it was from here that the Sabine king Titus Tatius marched on Rome, in the seventh year of the city, 747 BC, to avenge the Rape of the Sabine Women, and then agreed to settle in Rome. In the time of Augustus, Cures was merely a village, but it developed in the succeeding centuries, becoming in the 5th and 6th centuries the seat of a diocese, five of whose bishops are known by name because of their participation in synods or because of correspondence with the popes. The Lombards destroyed Cures, probably in 589, and the population dispersed. In a letter of February 593, Pope Gregory the Great ended the existence of the diocese as a residential see, adding its territory to that of Nomentum. Cures Sabinorum is today listed by the Catholic Church as a titular see.

=== Recent history ===
During World War II, Passo Corese was the site of a large POW camp, P.G. 54.

It was the venue for the riding part of the modern pentathlon event for the 1960 Summer Olympics.

== Geography ==
Located 35 km north of Rome, Passo Corese lies on a plain near the river Tiber, at the borders of the province of Rieti with the one of Rome. It is 8 km from Fiano Romano, 10 from Montelibretti and Farfa Abbey, 15 from Monterotondo and 16 from Fara in Sabina.

== Transport ==
The town is the seat of Fara Sabina-Montelibretti railway station, part of the Roman suburban railway line FL1 Orte–Fiumicino. It is crossed by the Italian state highway SS4 "Via Salaria", and is the starting point of the SS4 Dir, a short beltway that links Passo Corese with the A1 motorway Milan–Naples, on the northern Roman branch, at the exit "Fiano Romano".

== See also ==
- Cures, Sabinum
