= Fara in Sabina =

- Comune
- Comune di Fara in Sabina
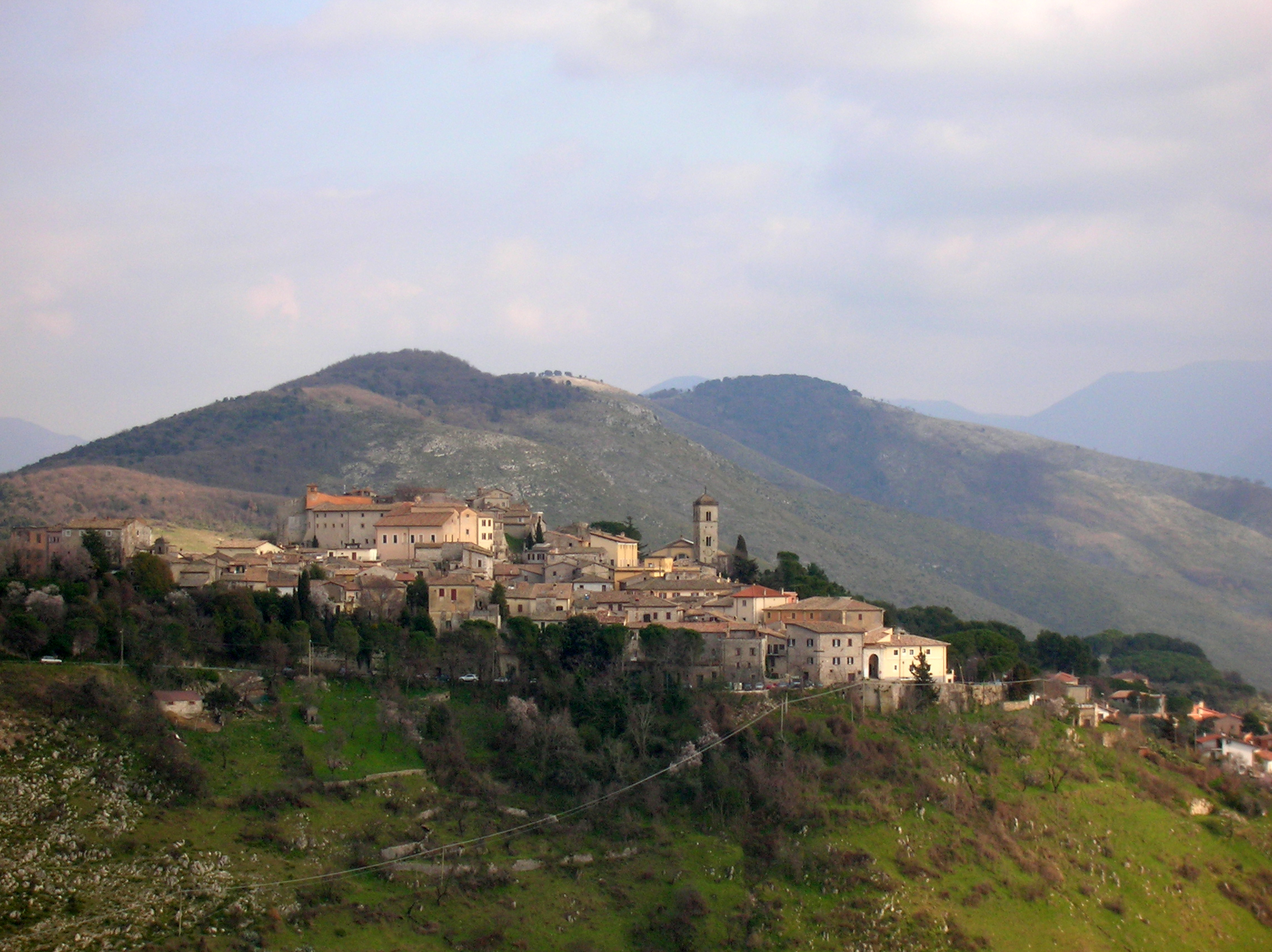
- Panoramic view

- Coat of arms

- Fara in Sabina within the Province of Rieti

- Location within Italy Location within Lazio
- Coordinates: 42°13′N 12°44′E
- Country: Italy
- Region: Lazio
- Province: Rieti (RI)
- Frazioni: Baccelli, Borgo Quinzio, Canneto Sabino, Coltodino, Corese Terra, Farfa, Passo Corese, Prime Case, Talocci

Government
  - Mayor: Roberta Cuneo

Area
  - Total: 55 km^{2} (21 sq mi)
- Elevation: 482 m (1,581 ft)

Population (31 December 2017)
  - Total: 13,904
  - Density: 250/km^{2} (650/sq mi)
- Demonym: Faresi
- Time zone: UTC+1 (CET)
  - Summer (DST): UTC+2 (CEST)
- Postal code: 02032
- Dialing code: 0765
- Patron saint: St. Antoninus
- Saint day: 2 September
- Website: Official website

Fara in Sabina (also shortened to Fara Sabina) is a comune (municipality) in the Province of Rieti in the Italian region of Lazio, located about 40 kilometres (25 mi) northeast of Rome and about 25 kilometres (16 mi) southwest of Rieti.

== History ==
The area was inhabited in prehistoric times, as attested by several archaeological findings from the mid-Palaeolithic and late Bronze Ages.

Between the 9th and the 6th centuries BC, a settlement of the Sabines, identified with the city of Cures, existed here, continuing into Roman Empire times. Remains from it include the baths, a small theatre and terraces for agriculture.

The origins of the modern town date from Lombard times (late 6th century AD), as it has been supposed from the presence of the Lombard word fara ("family clan") in the name. A castle is known from 1006 and, from 1050, Fara was a possession of the Abbey of Farfa, which is located in the present municipal territory. Later it was a fief of the Orsini.

During World War II, the POW camp P.G. 54 was located at adjacent Passo Corese.

The main Roman Catholic church is the Duomo Collegiata di Sant'Antonio Martire.

== Geography ==
The municipality borders with Castelnuovo di Farfa, Montelibretti, Montopoli di Sabina, Nerola and Toffia.

It counts the hamlets of Baccelli, Borgo Quinzio, Canneto Sabino, Coltodino, Corese Terra, Farfa, Passo Corese, Prime Case and Talocci.

== International relations ==
Fara in Sabina is twinned with:

- Montelupo Fiorentino, Italy
- Santa Vittoria in Matenano, Italy
- Villemur-sur-Tarn, France

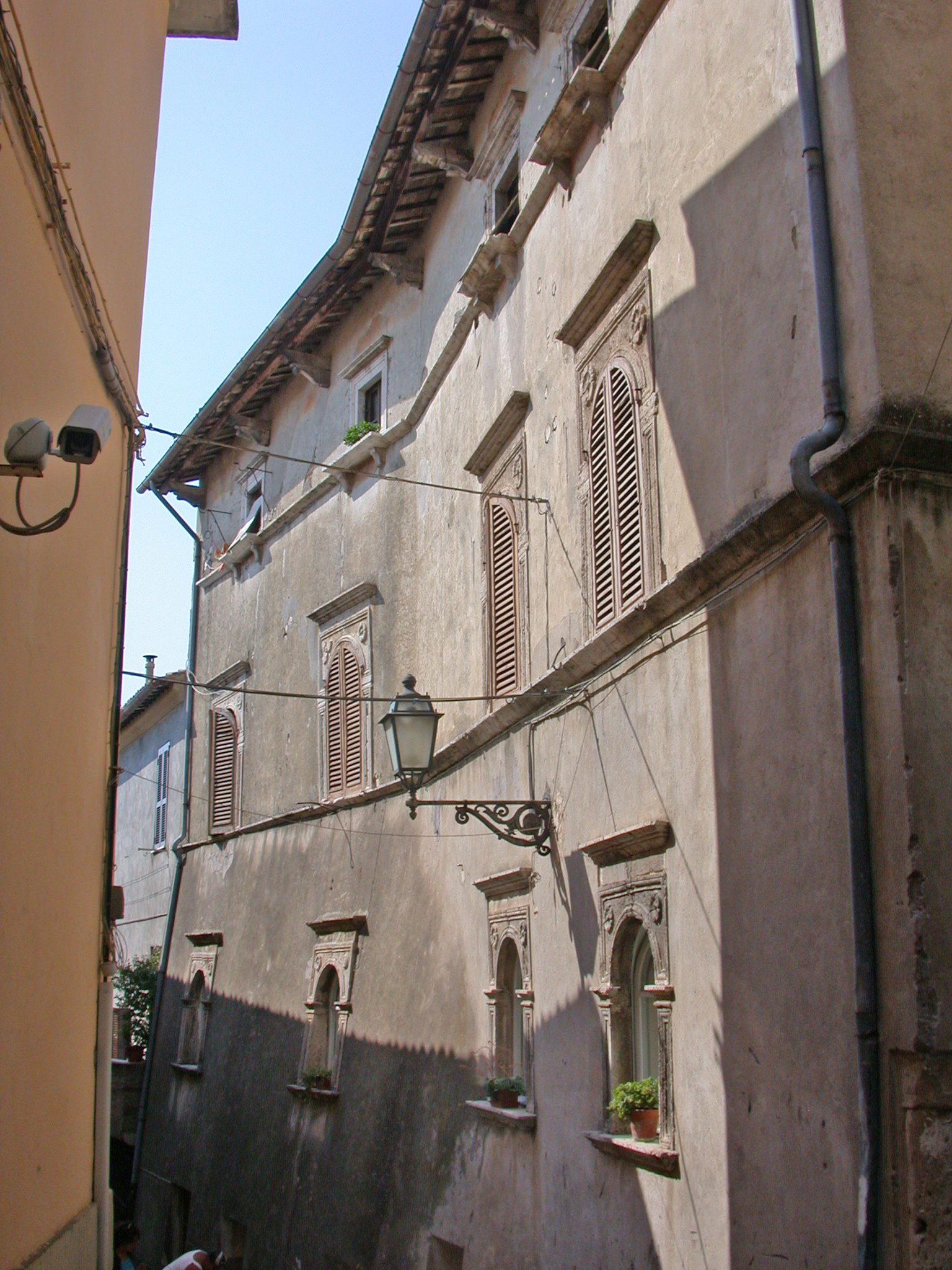
Orsini Palace.

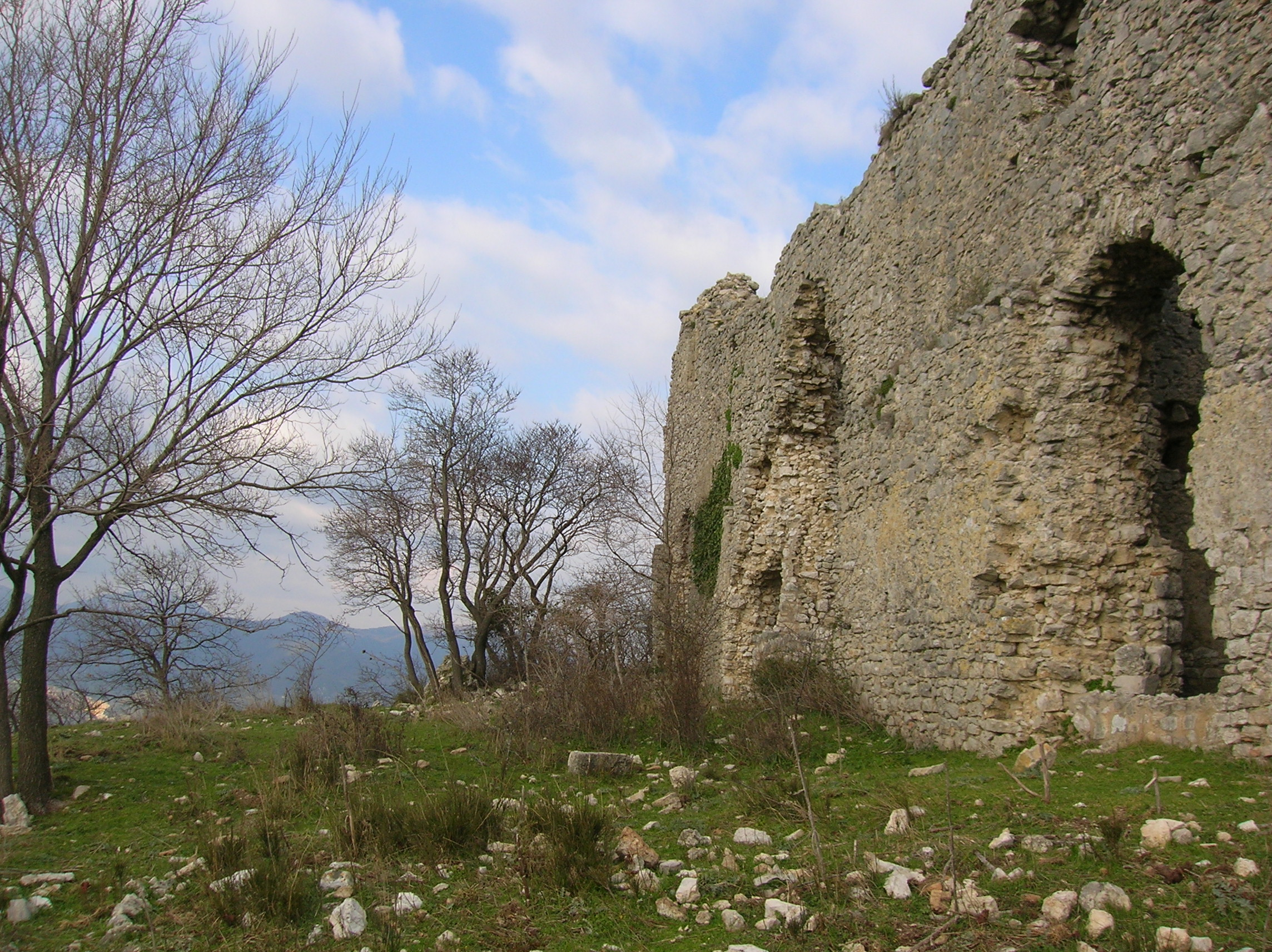
Remains of the Abbey of St. Martin.
