= Moricone =

- Comune
- Comune di Moricone
- Coat of arms

- Location within Italy Location within Lazio
- Coordinates: 42°7′N 12°46′E
- Country: Italy
- Region: Lazio
- Metropolitan city: Rome (RM)

Government
  - Mayor: Mariano Giubettini

Area
  - Total: 20.1 km^{2} (7.8 sq mi)
- Elevation: 296 m (971 ft)

Population (30 November 2017)
  - Total: 2,566
  - Density: 128/km^{2} (331/sq mi)
- Demonym: Moriconesi
- Time zone: UTC+1 (CET)
  - Summer (DST): UTC+2 (CEST)
- Postal code: 00010
- Dialing code: 0774
- Patron saint: Assumption of Mary
- Saint day: 22 August
- Website: Official website

Moricone is a comune (municipality) in the Metropolitan City of Rome in the Italian region of Latium, located about 35 kilometres (22 mi) northeast of Rome.

Moricone borders the following municipalities: Monteflavio, Montelibretti, Montorio Romano, Palombara Sabina.

Moricone is known for its fresh produce and olive oil.
