= San Nicola, Scandriglia =

Church in Scandriglia, Italy

Coordinates: 42.1572°N 12.8441°E

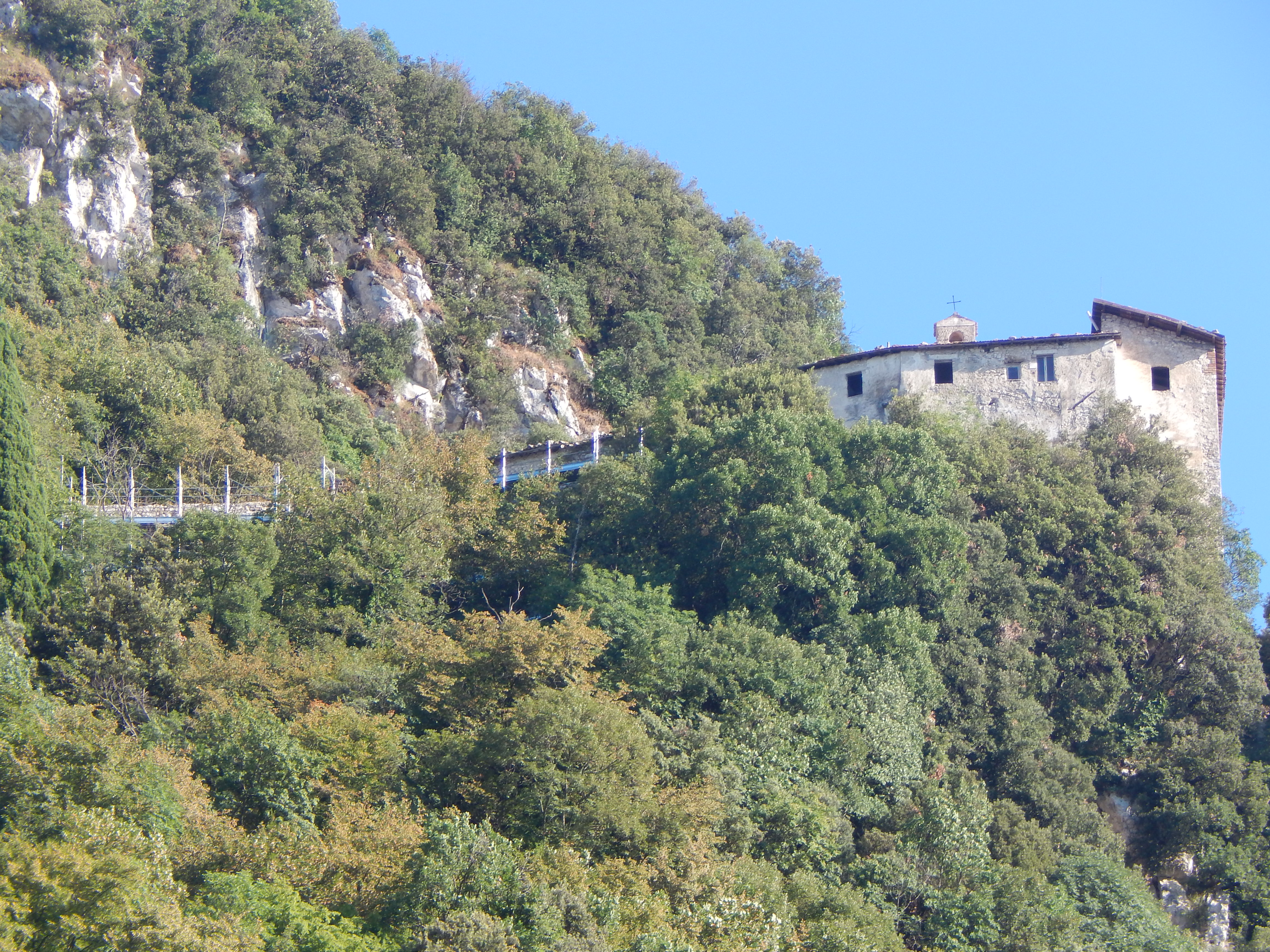
Convent as seen from below

The Convent of San Nicola was a Roman Catholic church and Capuchin convent located on the mountainside overlooking the town of Scandriglia, province of Rieti, region of Lazio, Italy.

== History ==
A 13th-century church was located at the site, putatively part of structures protecting the town below from rock falls. In 1530, the Capuchins built a convent at the site. The convent by 1700 housed 22 monks and had a notable library. The church formerly had a marble portal (now stolen) with the inscription: HAC EDEM DIVO NICOLAO EIUSDEM SOCIETAS SCAPITINIENSIS EX VOTO. The church formerly had a 13th-century triptych at the main altar depicting the Adoration of San Nicola, an Annunciation, a Pietà, and a Miracle by St Nicola. The convent also included a novitiate consecrated by the venerable Father Francesco da Bergamo (1536-1626). The church also had altarpieces depicting St Francis of Assisi, St Felice da Cantalice, St Fedele, and St Joseph of Leonessa.

In 1833-1836, cardinal Carlo Odescalchi visited and found 12 monks, with 5 priest of which three were confessors, while the other monks were clerical, and five lay brothers. In 1866, the convent was suppressed and confiscated by the state, although the monks were allowed to remain and care for the church, which remained consecrated until 1888. In 1940, it was used as vacation spot by an Italian Youth group. During the war, most of the objects were lost. In 1966, it was sold to a private owner.
