= Borgo Santa Maria, Montelibretti =

Borgo Santa Maria
- Frazione
- Location of Borgo Santa Maria in Italy
- Coordinates: 42°9′13″N 12°40′50″E
- Country: Italy
- Region: Lazio
- Province: Rome Capital (RM)
- Comune: Montelibretti

Population (2011)
  - Total: 604
- Time zone: UTC+1 (CET)
  - Summer (DST): UTC+2 (CEST)
- Postal code: 00010
- Dialing code: 0774

Borgo Santa Maria is a small town located 30 km north-east of Rome. It is a hamlet belonging to the municipality of Montelibretti.

It is situated on the Via Salaria, Km 38, close to other towns as Passo Corese and Borgo Quinzio.
