= Marcello Crescenzi =

Italian Roman Catholic bishop and cardinal

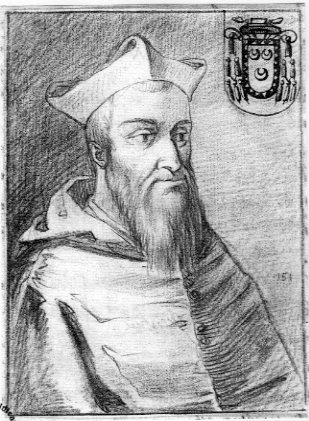
Marcello Crescenzi

Marcello Crescenzi (1500 – 28 May 1552) was an Italian Roman Catholic bishop and cardinal.

== Biography ==
Marcello Crescenzi was born in Rome in 1500, the son of Mario Crescenzi and Pantasilea Capodiferro.

He became a doctor of both laws. He was a canon of Santa Maria Maggiore. In 1525, he was made an Auditor of the Roman Rota.

On 19 January 1534, he was elected Bishop of Marsi. He resigned the government of the diocese sometime before 17 May 1546.

Pope Paul III made him a cardinal priest in the consistory of 2 June 1542. He received the red hat and the titular church of San Marcello al Corso on 6 November 1542.

On 2 November 1544, the pope appointed Cardinal Crescenzi to the Council of Trent. On 5 May 1546, he became administrator of the see of Conza, holding that position until his death.

He was a cardinal elector at the papal conclave of 1549-50 that elected Pope Julius III. The new pope made Crescenzi papal legate in Bologna. He was the Camerlengo of the Sacred College of Cardinals from 19 January 1551 to 8 January 1552. The pope named him to a commission on church reform on 18 February 1551 and, on 4 March 1551, named him legate a latere to the Council of Trent.

He died in Verona as he was returning to Rome from Trent on 28 May 1552. His remains were returned to Rome and he was buried in Santa Maria Maggiore.
