= Cretone =

Coordinates: 42°05′N 12°42′E

Cretone is a frazione of the comune of Palombara Sabina, in the Province of Rome, Italy.

== Geography ==
Its territory is covered mostly by forests and farmland. The hill descends to the wide esplanade of Cerreto-Quirani, considerably lower and surrounded by mild undulations of arenaceous conglomerate composition. The plain is the result of refilling the valleys of two streams coming from the west side of the Lucretilis Mons along the ditch of Grottoline.

== History ==
The appearance of ancient origins of this location are documented by numerous archaeological findings and writings. The village of Cretone occupies a hill, on top of which stands the medieval town. Molaccia found an interesting part of the necropolis. The center in Cretone facies sabina culture imbued with Etruscan influences.

The only archaeological intervention came in 1983 when the Soprintendenza Archeologica Lazio excavated a group of burial trenches, dated to 7th–6th century.

The castle and the 13th-century medieval village, bears walls with included pottery fragments. It is possible that the village earlier prolonged the plateau to the north end of the hill. The square includes 900 boats, the peak could be used to be isolated with a moat that the bottleneck in the league group of Three Southern Hills.

== Festivals and events ==
The patron saint is St. Vitus (San Vito) martyr who is celebrated on 15 June. In the second half of July there is a "Peach Festival" (Sagra della Perzica) festival in honor of one of the most fruit is grown in the surrounding countryside.

== Economy ==
Agriculture is the main activity in the territory. The geographical position in central Italy with the Lucretili mountains provides protection to the east and a superlative climate for agriculture, and allows Cretone to produce high-quality goods. In addition, recently the thermal baths Termi Sabine di Cretone have been developing tourist activity, as well as Cretone’s proximity to the Lucretilis Mons Regional Park.

Some areas in Cretonne produce extra-virgin olive oil with DOP recognition.
