= Alessandro Palombi =

Italian politician (born 1976)

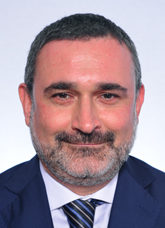
- Palombi in 2022

Member of the Chamber of Deputies
- Incumbent
- Assumed office 13 October 2022
- Constituency: Lazio 1 – 09

Personal details
- Born: 7 July 1976 (age 49)
- Party: Brothers of Italy (since 2013)

Alessandro Palombi (born 7 July 1976) is an Italian politician serving as a member of the Chamber of Deputies since 2022. He has served as mayor of Palombara Sabina since 2015.
