= Borgo Santa Maria, Latina =

Borgo Santa Maria
- Frazione
- Location of Borgo Santa Maria in Italy
- Coordinates: 41°27′46″N 12°48′29″E
- Country: Italy
- Region: Lazio
- Province: Latina (LT)
- Comune: Latina

Population (2011)
  - Total: 640
- Time zone: UTC+1 (CET)
  - Summer (DST): UTC+2 (CEST)
- Postal code: 04100
- Dialing code: 0773

Borgo Santa Maria is a small town located 10 km west of Latina, in Lazio, Italy. Its population amounted to 640 in 2011 (Istat census).
