= Castello Orsini di Nerola =

Coordinates: 42°09′46″N 12°47′13″E

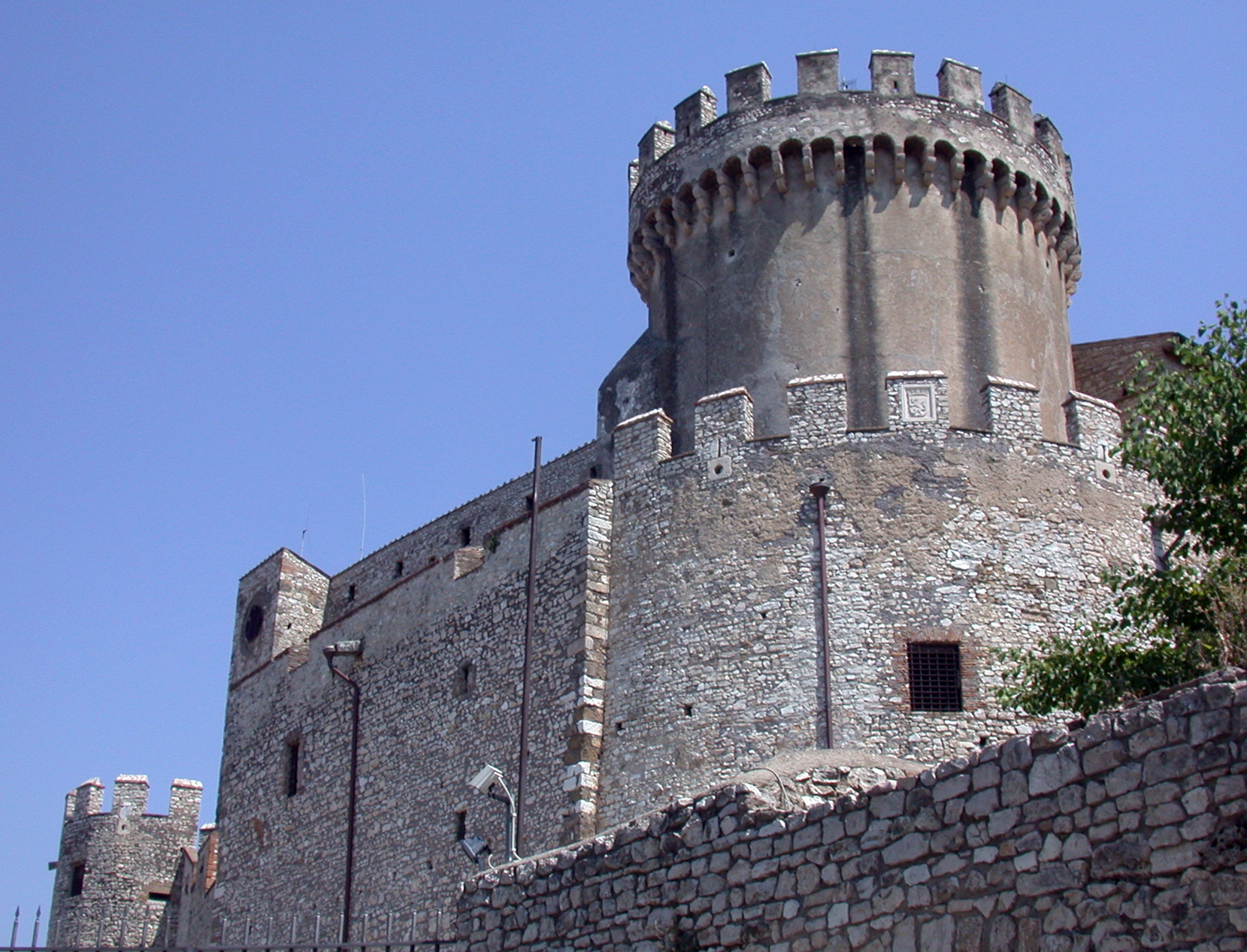
View of the Castle

The Castello Orsini di Nerola or Castello di Nerola is a medieval, Romanesque-style castle situated atop a hill above the town of Nerola in the Province of Rome, Italy. The address is on via Aldo Bigelli. It now functions as a hotel and conference center.

== History ==
A castle at the site likely dates to the 10th century, but documentation places the castle in the hands of the Orsini family by 1235. In that century, the outline of the castle, with merlonated walls, a moat, and towers was built. Ultimately, the castle would be sold in 1728 to Cornelia Barberini and Giulio Cesare Colonna. It was used as shelter by the Garibaldini in the 1867 attack on Rome.
