= Borgo Santa Maria, Pesaro =

Borgo Santa Maria
- Frazione
- Location of Borgo Santa Maria in Italy
- Coordinates: 43°52′33″N 12°48′8″E
- Country: Italy
- Region: Marche
- Province: Pesaro and Urbino (PU)
- Comune: Pesaro
- Elevation: 40 m (130 ft)

Population (2001)
  - Total: 3,369
- Demonym: pozzesi
- Time zone: UTC+1 (CET)
  - Summer (DST): UTC+2 (CEST)
- Postal code: 61122
- Dialing code: 0721

Borgo Santa Maria is a small town located 10 km south-west of Pesaro, in Marche, Italy. Its population amounted to 3,369 in 2001 (Istat census).
