= Scandriglia =

- Comune
- Comune di Scandriglia
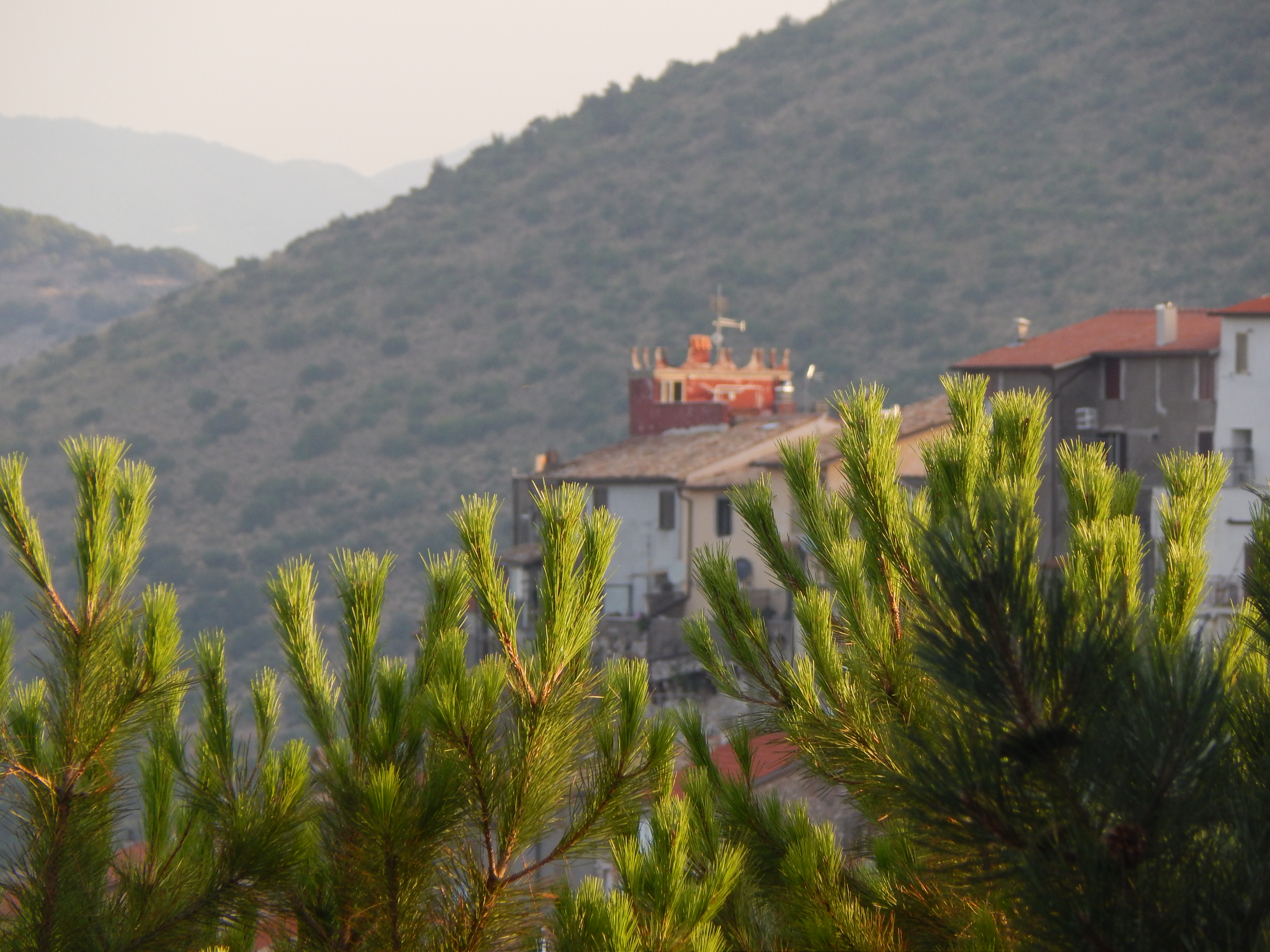
- View of Scandriglia

- Coat of arms

- Location within Italy Location within Lazio
- Coordinates: 42°10′N 12°51′E
- Country: Italy
- Region: Lazio
- Province: Rieti (RI)
- Frazioni: Ponticelli Sabino

Government
  - Mayor: Paolo Palmieri

Area
  - Total: 63.35 km^{2} (24.46 sq mi)
- Elevation: 535 m (1,755 ft)

Population (30 November 2015)
  - Total: 3,140
  - Density: 49.6/km^{2} (128/sq mi)
- Demonym: Scandrigliesi
- Time zone: UTC+1 (CET)
  - Summer (DST): UTC+2 (CEST)
- Postal code: 02038
- Dialing code: 0765
- Website: Official website

Scandriglia is a comune (municipality) in the Province of Rieti in the Italian region of Latium, located about 40 kilometres (25 mi) northeast of Rome and about 25 kilometres (16 mi) south of Rieti.

In the frazione of Ponticelli Sabino, is located the Franciscan convent and sanctuary of Santa Maria delle Grazie, built originally in the 15th century. On a mountainside overlooking the town is the former convent and church of the Capuchin order, San Nicola.
