= Nerola =

- Comune
- Comune di Nerola
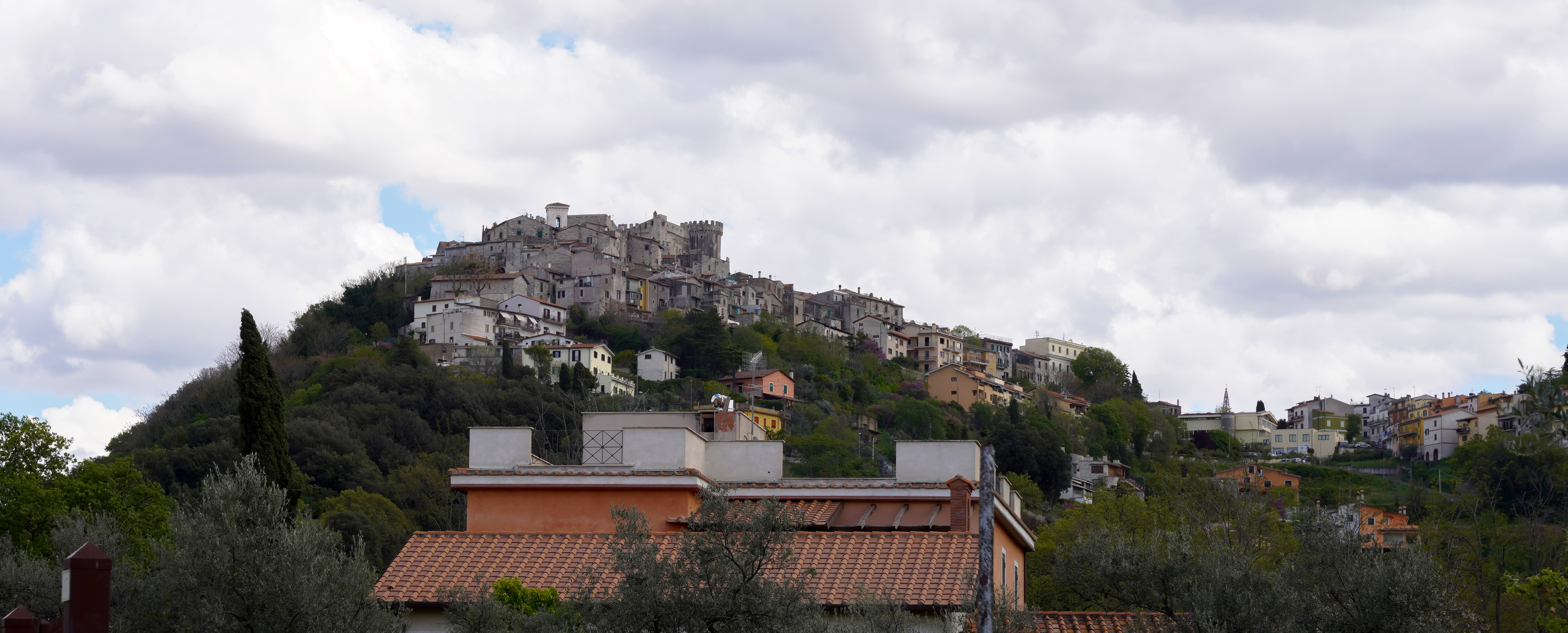
- Historical center of Nerola

- Location within Italy Location within Lazio
- Coordinates: 42°09′39″N 12°47′13″E
- Country: Italy
- Region: Lazio
- Metropolitan city: Rome (RM)

Government
  - Mayor: Sabina Granieri

Area
  - Total: 18 km^{2} (6.9 sq mi)
- Elevation: 453 m (1,486 ft)

Population (31 December 2014)
  - Total: 1,941
  - Density: 110/km^{2} (280/sq mi)
- Demonym: Nerolesi
- Time zone: UTC+1 (CET)
  - Summer (DST): UTC+2 (CEST)
- Postal code: 00017
- Dialing code: 0774
- Patron saint: St. George
- Saint day: 23 April

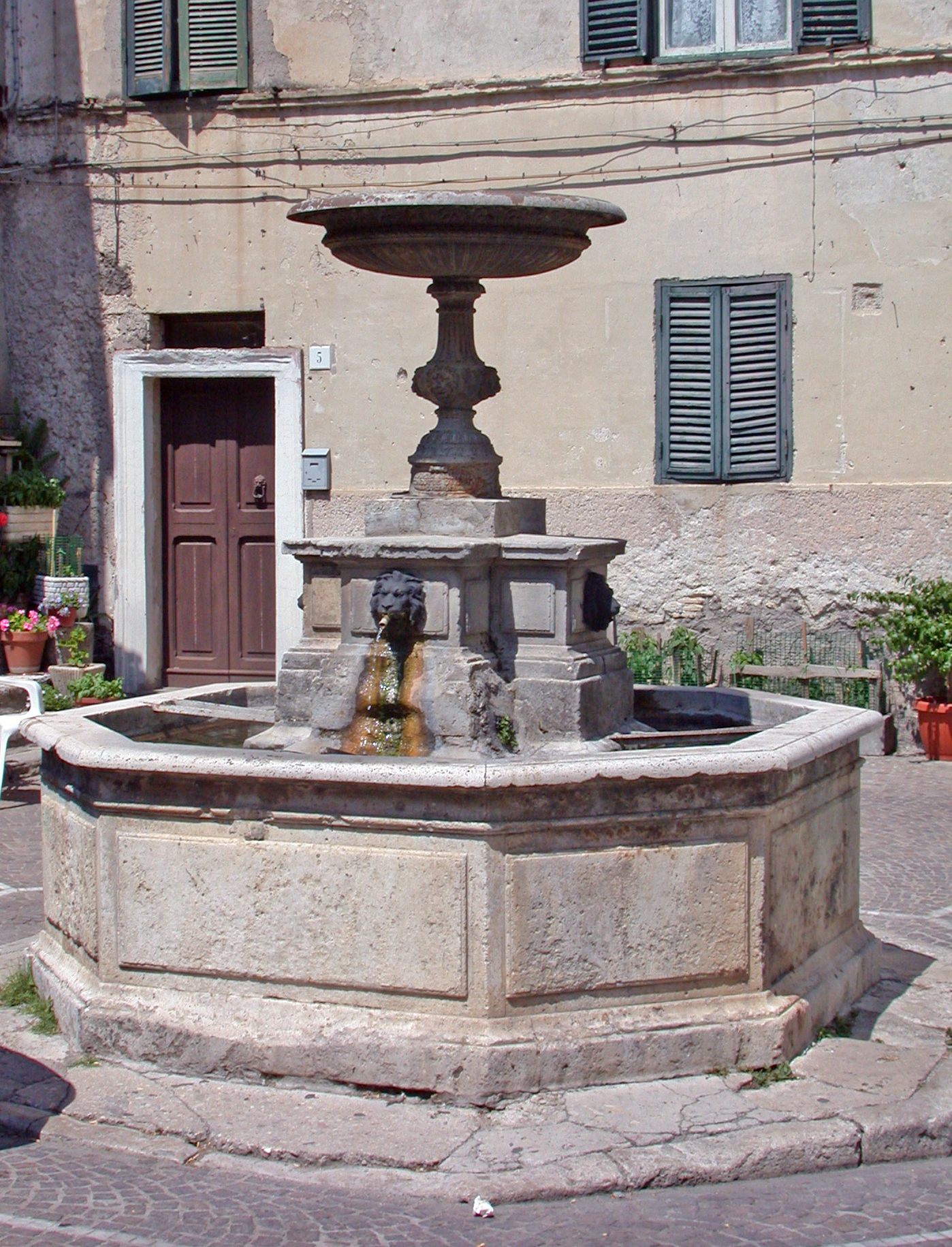
The fountain in the town hall square.

Nerola is a town and comune of the Metropolitan City of Rome, Latium, Italy.

== Name ==
The name Nerola is probably derived from the Sabine word nero or nerio, which meant "strong" and "brave". The inscription on the fountain in the piazza of the town hall A Nerone tuum Nerola nomen habet traces the origin of the name back to the Roman emperor Nero, who belonged to the gens Claudia, which had distant Sabine origins. Traces of a Roman era villa have been found on that site, which legend attributes as belonging to Nero himself.

== History ==
=== Acquaviva ===
Within the comune is the frazione of Acquaviva, on the ancient Via Salaria. This may have been the seat of the bishopric called Aquaviva in Latin, whose bishops took part in synods held in Rome in the second half of the 5th century and the beginning of the 6th: Paulus or Paulinus in 465, Benignus in 487, 497, and 502, and Bonifacius in 503. No longer a residential bishopric, Aquaviva is today listed by the Catholic Church as a titular see.

=== Castello Orsini di Nerola ===
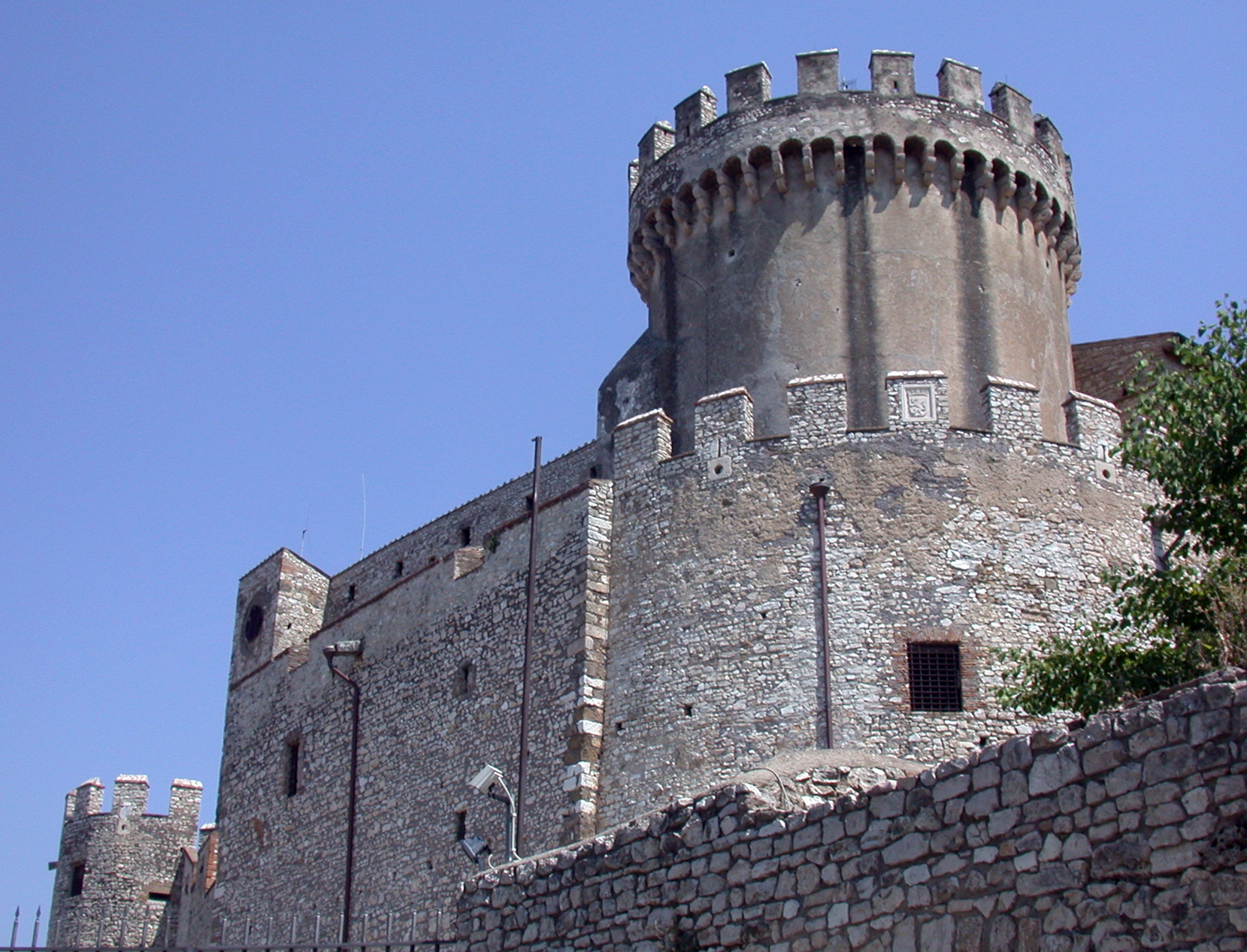
Castello Orsini at Nerola.

In the second half of the 10th century, the castle Castrum Nerulae was founded by the "Sabine chancellor" Benedetto Crescenzi, and the Crescenzi family held it until 1235, when it came under the direct control of the pope. At the end of the 12th century, the fiefdom was granted to the Orsini family, who built the present Castello Orsini. At the end of the 15th century, the castle was subsequently reinforced with strong towers and other defensive fortifications around the village. Near the castle, the chiesa vecchia (Old Church) was built in 1483.

In 1644, the castle and the territory of Nerola were yielded to the Barberini family along with the Montelibretti family and, in 1728, entered into possession of the Sciarra clan, and thence to the Lante della Rovere family, who founded the charitable institution of the Ospedale dei Pellegrini to assist travellers on the Via Salaria.

In 1867, the castle was occupied by a contingent of partisans of Giuseppe Garibaldi who were fighting against papal troops.

Since passing to Marquis Ferrari-Frey in 1939, the castle has been restored and now houses a hotel.

=== COVID-19 ===
During the COVID-19 pandemic, Nerola suffered a particularly high infection rate, and was entirely quarantined by authorities around the end of March 2020. Public health officials then attempted to test every one of its more than 1800 inhabitants to better understand the spread of the virus.
