= Palombara Sabina =

- Comune
- Comune di Palombara Sabina
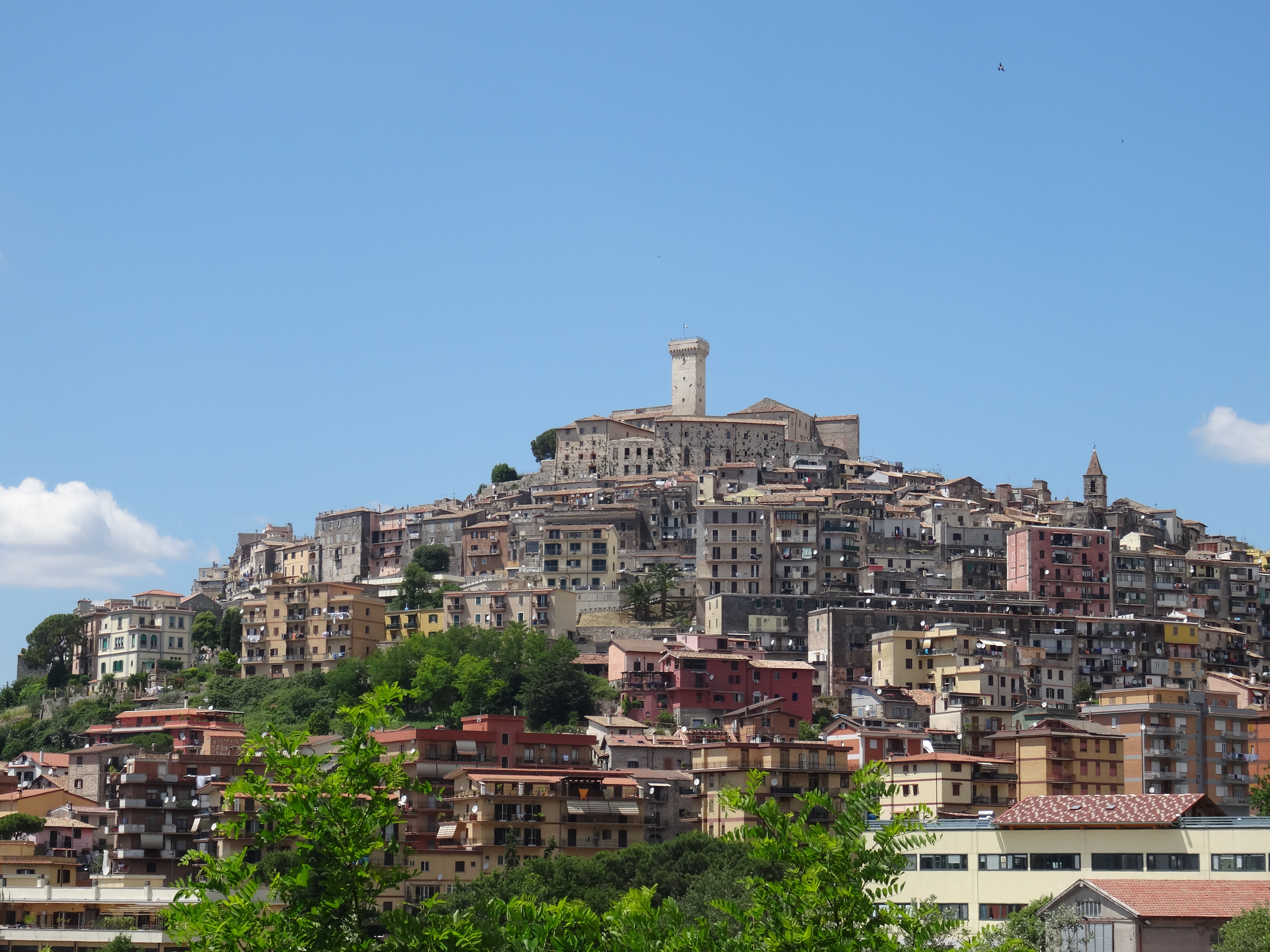
- View of Palombara Sabina

- Coat of arms

- Location within Italy Location within Lazio
- Coordinates: 42°04′N 12°46′E
- Country: Italy
- Region: Lazio
- Metropolitan city: Rome (RM)
- Frazioni: Stazzano, Cretone

Government
  - Mayor: Alessandro Palombi

Area
  - Total: 75.8 km^{2} (29.3 sq mi)
- Elevation: 372 m (1,220 ft)

Population (31 December 2017)
  - Total: 13,200
  - Density: 174/km^{2} (451/sq mi)
- Demonym: Palombaresi
- Time zone: UTC+1 (CET)
  - Summer (DST): UTC+2 (CEST)
- Postal code: 00018
- Dialing code: 0774
- Patron saint: Saint Blaise
- Saint day: 3 February
- Website: Official website

Palombara Sabina (Romanesco: Palommara) is a town and comune in the Metropolitan City of Rome, Italy.

== Main sights ==
- Savelli Castle, built from the 11th century by the Ottaviani, a branch of the Crescentii family of Rome. Antipope Innocent III was arrested here in 1180. It was acquired by Luca Savelli, a nephew of pope Honorius III, in 1250, whence the current name. It was rebuilt in the 16th century by Troilo Savelli, who commissioned his friend Baldassarre Peruzzi the frescoes which are still visible inside, including portraits of Roman famous men, allegories of the Liberal Arts and grotesque decorations. It is now home to a library, an exhibition of Roman statues found nearby Palombara in 2008, and a natural sciences museum.
- Abbey of Saint John in Argentella (6th century)
- Church of Santa Maria Annunziata (14th century)
- Church of St. Blaise (1101), in Romanesque style.
- Fortified village of Castiglione, in the Monti Lucretili park, at 750 metres (2,460 ft).
- Convent of St. Michael, in rural Romanesque style. It was built over a Roman villa, of which traces of opus reticulatum remain.
