= Hans Christian Göttlicher =

German civil engineer, teacher and politician (born 1977)

member of the Landtag of Hesse for the constituency of Kassel-Land I
- Incumbent
- Assumed office October 8, 2023

Personal details
- Born: May 2, 1977 (age 48) Kessel
- Party: Christian Democratic Union of Germany
- Website: https://www.hans-christian-goettlicher.de/

Hans Christian Göttlicher (born May 2, 1977) is a German civil engineer, teacher and politician. He is a member of the Landtag of Hesse (the state parliament of Hesse) and the Christian Democratic Union of Germany (CDU).

== Career ==
Göttlicher graduated from the Albert Schweitzer School in Hofgeismar and then completed his community service at the Käthe Kollwitz School. He then studied civil engineering and graduated with a degree in civil engineering. He then worked for a few years as a civil engineer and studied teaching at the University of Münster and the University of Kassel as a career changer. Since 2008, Göttlicher has been teaching physics and work education technology at the Vellmar comprehensive school.

Göttlicher is married and lives with his family in Immenhausen.

In terms of local politics, Göttlicher is a member of the city council in Immenhausen. In the mayoral election in the SPD party stronghold of Immenhausen in 2021, he received 26.9% of the vote.

In the 2023 Hessian state election on October 8, 2023, he was elected to the Landtag of Hesse for the constituency of Kassel-Land I. In the Landtag, he is a member of the Interior Committee, the Cultural Policy Committee and the Petitions Committee, as well as a deputy member of the Main Committee.
