= Gandersheim Conflict =

Conflict over control of an abbey, 987–1030

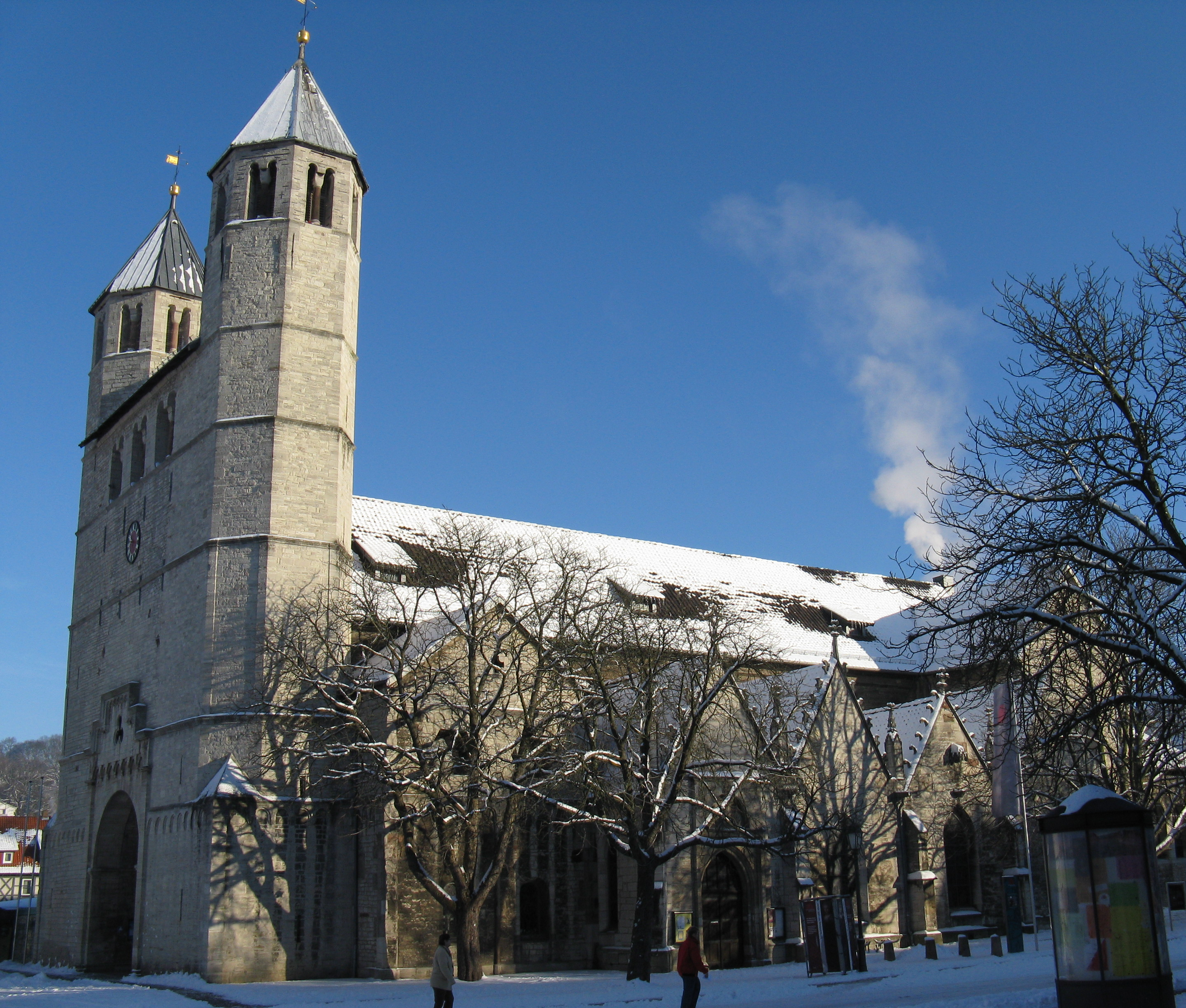
Gandersheim Abbey Church

The Great Gandersheim Conflict (German: Gandersheimer Streit) was a conflict between the Archbishops of Mainz and the Bishops of Hildesheim concerning the jurisdiction over Gandersheim Abbey. It lasted from 987 to 1030, during the reign of the Ottonian emperors Otto III and Henry II as well as of their Salian successor Conrad II.

== Background ==
The conflict flared up for the first time in 987, when Sophia, a daughter of late Emperor Otto II who had been raised in Gandersheim since 979, should become invested as a canoness. Aware of her royal origin, she refused to become invested by the local Bishop Osdag of Hildesheim and insisted on an ordination by the Mainz archbishop Willigis.

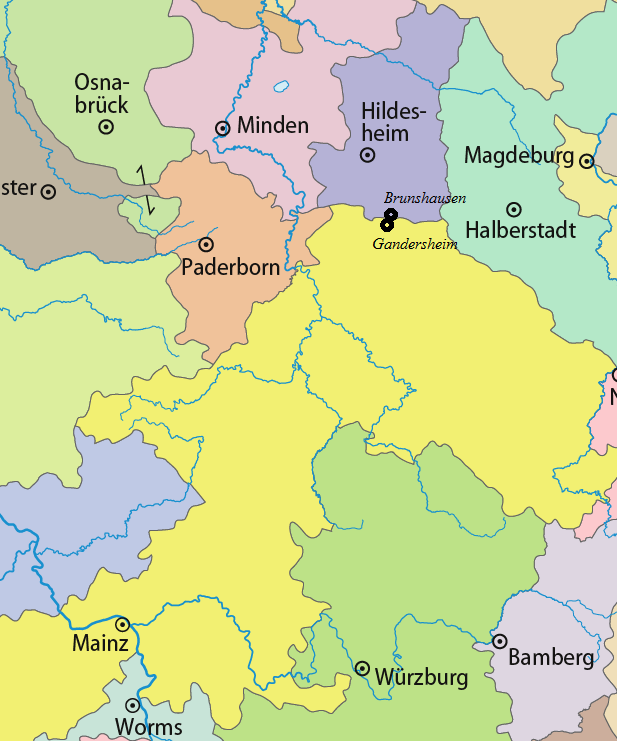
Diocesan territories of Hildesheim (violet) and Mainz (yellow) before German mediatization

The Mainz archbishop took the occasion to file a claim to the jurisdiction over the Gandersheim estates: the monastery had been founded in 852 at nearby Brunshausen, which belongs to the Diocese of Hildesheim, however, four years later the canonesses had moved to the present location in Gandersheim, thereby crossing the border with the Archdiocese of Mainz. The bishops of Hildesheim continued to exercise episcopal authority, though against the will of the Mainz archbishops. Empress dowager Theophanu, acting as regent for Sophia's brother Otto III, arbitrated between the parties and reached an agreement under which both bishops, Willigis of Mainz and Osdag of Hildesheim, invested Sophia as a canoness.

Consequently, the conflict was averted for the time being. When the Saxon noble Bernward, a close friend to King Otto III, became Bishop of Hildesheim in 993, he initially maintained friendly relations with Archbishop Willigis. However, Sophia displeased him when she stayed at the royal court of her brother for two years between 995 and 997, a very unusual behaviour for a canoness. Bishop Bernward sent Sophia back to Gandersheim, in consequence she got infuriated. Furthermore, he intrigued against Willigis, as Bernward felt that the archbishop had tempted Sophia to leave her monastery, and arranged his removal from the group of advisors to King Otto.

== Continuation ==
On 14 September 1000 the rebuilt premises of Gandersheim Abbey, which had been destroyed by a fire in 973, were supposed to be consecrated again. Meanwhile, Sophia undertook the tasks of the Abbess Gerberga II, who had fallen seriously ill. She wanted Archbishop Willigis to consecrate the newly erected abbey church and Bernward was convinced that the consecration of the abbey fell into the Mainz area of responsibility. Sophia only involved Willigis into the planning of the ceremony and sent Bernward an invitation. Bernward accepted and announced his arrival on September 14.

Later however, Archbishop Willigis postponed the celebrations by one week to the date of September 21, when Bernward was tied up by other commitments at the imperial court. Bernward appeared in Gandersheim on the original date, but had to realize that the ceremony had not been prepared. So he hold a holy mass and lamented that Sophia denied him the right to consecrate the abbey. The mass turned into a riot and Bernward left Gandersheim without having achieved anything. One week later, Archbishop Willigis arrived in Gandersheim. Bernward did not appear due to his other commitments, so Willigis demanded for him being present the next day, otherwise he would consecrate the abbey all by himself. Bernward, however, had anticipated Willigis plans by sending the Schleswig bishop Ekkehard as his representative. With reference to canon law, Ekkehard was able to prevent the consecration by Willigis.

Holy Roman Empire, 972–1032

Furious, Willigis convened a provincial synod in Gandersheim on November 28, where Bernward did also not appear as he was already on the way to Rome to tell Pope Sylvester II and Emperor Otto III about the incidents. He reached Rome on 4 January 1001, just two days later, a legate of Bishop Ekkehard appeared and reported the arguments at the Gandersheim synod. Both the pope and the emperor were angry about the happenings. On January 13, a papal synod nullified all Gandersheim proceedings. In a sharp letter, Archbishop Willigis was reprimanded and urged to hand off the rights about Gandersheim.

Willigis, however, did not react and still hindered Bernward from doing his official duties – with the support by Sophia, who had provoked the collegiate chapter against him. Another synod was held by a papal legate at Pöhlde on 21/22 June, where Willigis armed followers aborted the reading out of the papal letter. More meetings were necessary to solve the conflict: Willigis invited Bernward to a synod in Frankfurt on August 15, however, the Hildesheim bishop fell ill and again sent Ekkehard of Schleswig and his confidant Thangmar; much to the annoyance of Willigis, who questioned Bernward's disease and demanded an oath by his representatives. The meeting failed and Emperor Otto called for another convention at Todi on December 27. Given the weather conditions, few bishops had arrived by then; the meeting was postponed to 6 January 1002 and finally cancelled when the emperor died on January 24. Therefore, the Gandersheim Conflict remained unsolved.

Under Otto's successor, King Henry II, the conflict was still smouldering. The situation between the Mainz and Hildesheim dioceses remained tense. In view of this circumstances, Henry invited both bishops on Christmas 1006 to Pöhlde. Both bishops appeared and deferred to the will of the king. The new date for the consecration of Gandersheim Abbey was scheduled on 5 January 1007; Bernward had the task to plan the ceremony. Henry II participated in the consecration and during the mass he officially declared that the jurisdiction over Gandersheim was the task of the Hildesheim bishops. Willigis reluctantly had to agree to the compromise; in turn, he had the honor to officiate at the consecration of the abbey. The archbishop died in 1011. Neither he nor his successor Erkanbald resumed the quarrels.

== Resolution ==
The conflict again flared up, when upon Erkanbald's death in 1021 Aribo became archbishop. Though he had vowed to Emperor Henry not to resume the Gandersheim Conflict, he asked the new Bishop Gotthard of Hildesheim to enter in negotiations. Gotthard was invested by Archbishop Aribo of Mainz in 1022, whereby he forbade the new Hildesheim bishop any official act or religious ceremony in Gandersheim. Godehard referred to the 1007 compromise and lodged a complaint with Emperor Henry II, who had to resolve the crisis again before he died in 1024.

Tables seemed to turn under Henry's successor, the first Salian king Conrad II, who was crowned King of the Romans by Aribo at Mainz Cathedral. The archbishop was already one of his closest friends, had ensured the new king's election, and now saw the opportunity to get the jurisdiction over Gandersheim again. Bishop Godehard, however, became aware of his plan and invited Conrad and his followers to Hildesheim. During his stay in Hildesheim in January 1025, Aribo lamented that he and not Godehard was the authorized bishop of Gandersheim. Conrad II gave both bishops his promise that he would solve the conflict at a diet in the nearby Palace of Goslar on January 27. Here both bishops were deprived of their authority over Gandersheim, which temporarily was assigned to Bishop Branthog of Halberstadt. Nevertheless, when Conrad proceeded to Gandersheim the next day, Godehard hurried ahead to receive him with much pomp as a host, to the annoyance of the king and Archbishop Aribo.

After Bishop Godehard had fallen prostrate at Conrad's feet requesting his mercy, the king at a synod in March 1025 decided in favor of Hildesheim. Archbishop Aribo initially made no protest but in summer asked for another convention. While his relations with Conrad and also with Abbess Sophia deteriorated, he and Godehard met in the Eichsfeld, though no solution was found. Another rapprochement initiated by King Conrad on 21 September 1026 in Seligenstadt failed too. The jurisdiction of Hildesheim was confirmed by a 1027 synod in Frankfurt, while Aribo continuously tried to have the resolutions revoked.

Finally Conrad pushed both sides to a compromise, that finally was found during another meeting in Pöhlde: Hildesheim was given the jurisdiction over Gandersheim, conversely Mainz was vested with several surrounding estates. On 17 May 1030 the emperor celebrated Pentecost at Merseburg Cathedral, whereby he proclaimed the solution of the long-time quarrels. Later Aribo's successor Archbishop Bardo officially renounced any claims to Gandersheim Abbey. Thereafter the conflict did not arise again.

== Sources ==
- Thangmar: Vita Bernwardi. In: Georg Heinrich Pertz (Hrsg.): Annales, chronica et historiae aevi Carolini et Saxonici (MGH SS 4), Hannover 1841.
