= Bernward Doors =

Bronze doors, made c. 1015 for Hildesheim Cathedral, Germany

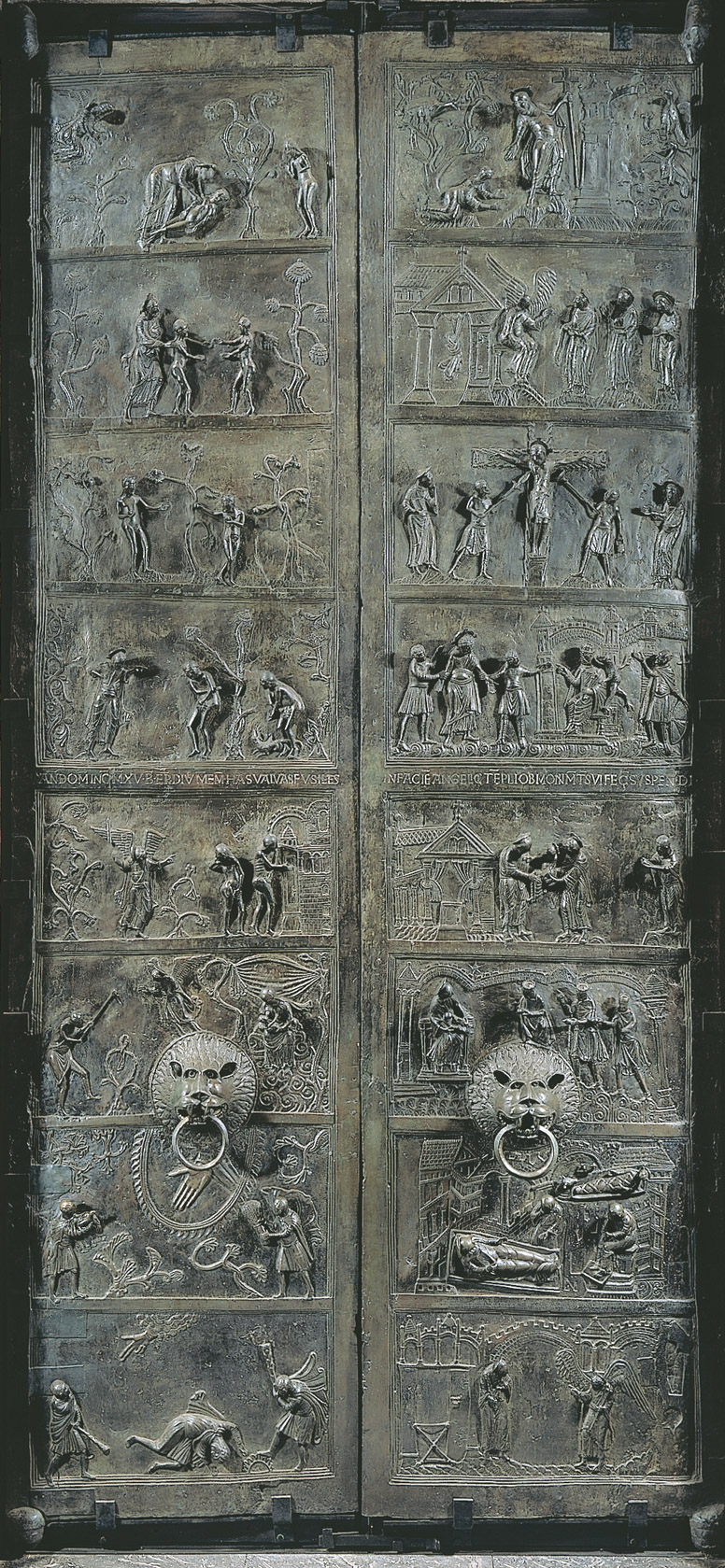
- The image side of the bronze doors of the Hildesheim Cathedral, showing scenes from the Book of Genesis on the left leaf, from top to bottom, and from the life of Jesus on the right leaf, from bottom to top
- Year: c. 1015
- Type: Ottonian art
- Medium: Bronze
- Location: Hildesheim, Germany; 52.1489°N 9.9464°E

The Bernward Doors (German: Bernwardstür) are the two leaves of a pair of Ottonian or Romanesque bronze doors, made c. 1015 for Hildesheim Cathedral in Germany. They were commissioned by Bishop Bernward of Hildesheim (938–1022). The doors show relief images from the Bible, scenes from the Book of Genesis on the left door and from the life of Jesus on the right door. They are considered a masterpiece of Ottonian art, and feature the oldest known monumental image cycle in German sculpture, and also the oldest cycle of images cast in metal in Germany.

== History ==
Along with the Bernward Column, the doors are part of Bishop Bernward's efforts to create a cultural ascendancy for the seat of his diocese with artistic masterpieces in the context of the Renovatio imperii sought by the Ottonians. A Latin inscription on the middle crossbar produced after Bernward's death gives the year 1015 as the terminus ante quem for the creation of the doors:

AN[NO] DOM[INI] INC[ARNATIONIS] M XV B[ERNVARDVS] EP[ISCOPVS] DIVE MEM[ORIE] HAS VALVAS FVSILES IN FACIE[M] ANGELICI TE[M]PLI OB MONIM[EN]T[VM] SVI FEC[IT] SVSPENDI

(In the 1015th year of the incarnation of the Lord, Bishop Bernward (richly remembered) had these cast doors hung at the front of the angelic temple to his own memory)

== Creation and technical features ==
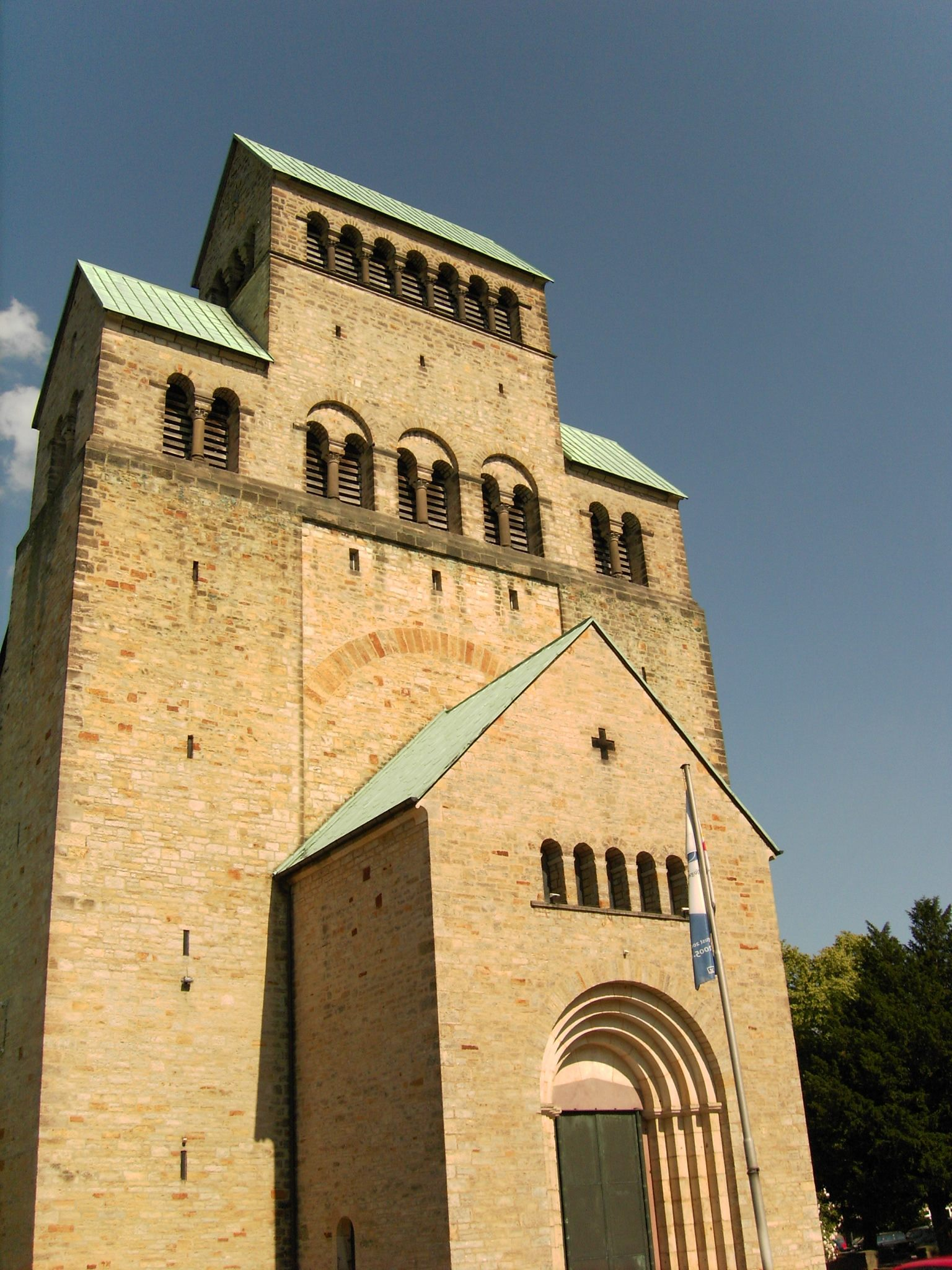
The westwork of Hildesheim Cathedral in 2005.

Each leaf of the doors was cast as a single piece. Given the size (left: 472.0 x 125.0 cm, right: 472.0 x 114.5 cm, maximum thickness c. 3.5-4.5 cm) and enormous weight (both c. 1.85 tonnes) of the doors, this is a great achievement for its time. The raw material for the casting was Gunmetal, which consisted predominantly of copper (above 80%) with roughly equal parts of lead, tin, and zinc. To date material analysis has not been able to show which ore deposit the metal came from, though the ironworks at Rammelsberg near Goslar has been ruled out.

Like their predecessors, the Wolfstür (Wolf's door) of the Aachen Cathedral and the Marktportal (Market Portal) of the Mainz Cathedral, the Bernward Doors were manufactured using the Lost-wax process, which puts exceptional demands on the workers of the casting workshop, since the mold can only be used once. The individual scenes of the doors were carved from massive wax or tallow tablets by modellers and then combined, supported by an iron frame, which is probably how the slight irregularities in the bands which divide the individual scenes came about. Even the doorknockers in the form of grotesque lion's heads with rings of grace in their mouths were included in the original mold rather than being soldered on later. Technical analysis has shown that the mold was stood on the long side and filled with bronze, so that the molten metal would spread evenly; investigation has found cooling cracks in the metal. The result of this process was probably still rather rough, covered in metal bumps from the pipes in the mold through which the metal was poured in and through which air escaped and it would have had to have been worked over and polished up in great detail.

== Iconography ==
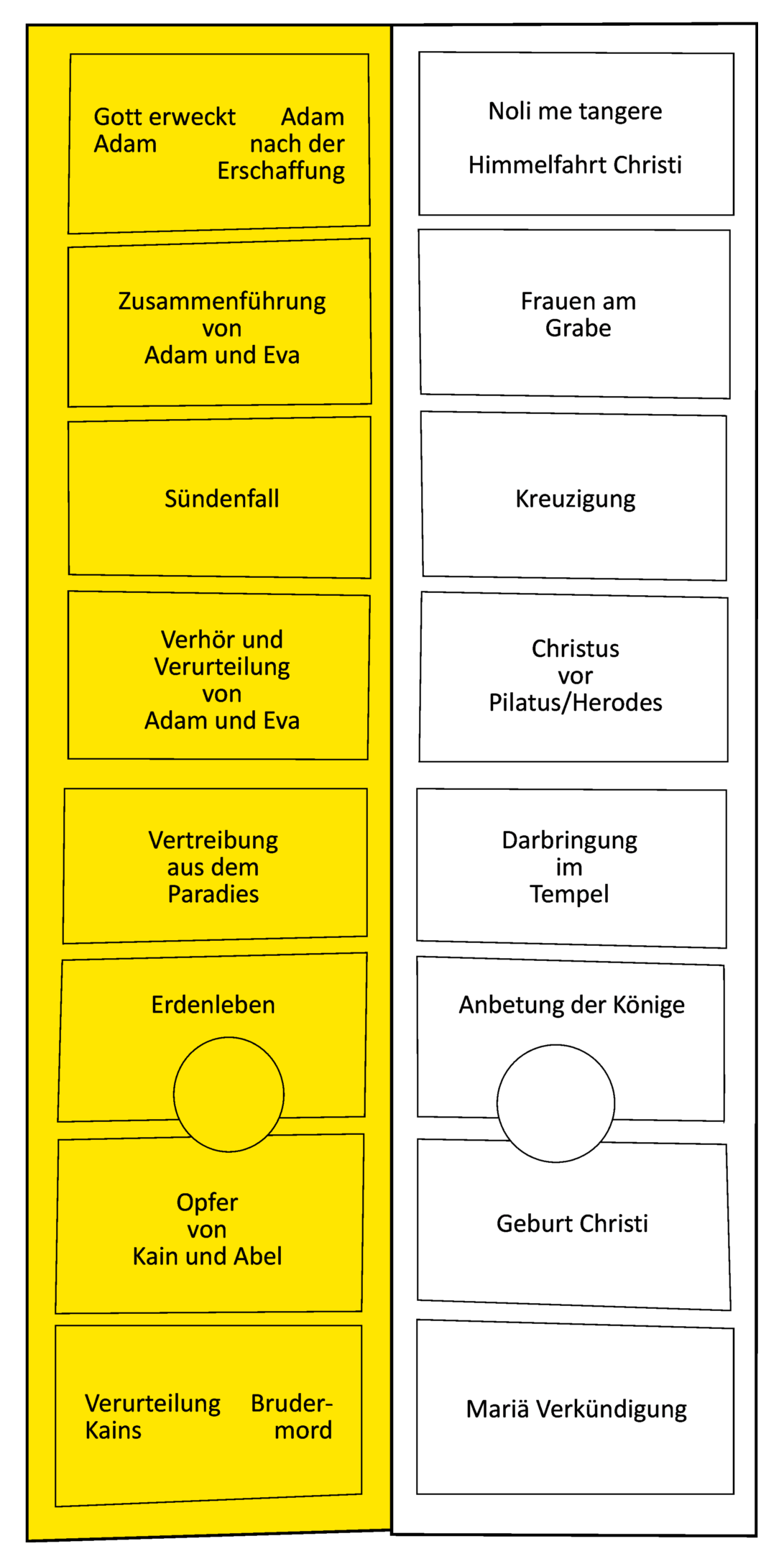
Iconographic program of the Bernward Doors, in German

The Bernward Doors depict scenes from the Book of Genesis (left door) arranged in parallel to scenes from the Gospels (right door). The scenes are organized based on the principle that Adam and Christ mirror each other - with Christ's sacrificial death redeeming Adam's sin. The left door depicts the increasing estrangement of humanity from God from top to bottom: the Creation, the Fall, Cain's murder of Abel. The right door shows the redemptive work of Christ from bottom to top: the Annunciation and Nativity, the Passion, the Resurrection). The depictions of the right door, in which the birth and childhood of Jesus are followed immediately by his passion and resurrection, are complemented thematically by the depiction of his life and ministry on the Bernward Column, which was probably also donated by Bernward, and stood in the east choir of St. Michael's until the eighteenth century.

In some cases, several events which chronologically occur one after another are depicted in a single panel, leading to an odd sense of multiplicity. This was an artistic convention of the time, much used in illuminated manuscripts. So for example, Adam appears twice in the scene of his awakening by God the Father.

=== Left door ===
- Top panel: God creates Adam. Adam after the creation.
- Second panel: Adam and Eve are introduced
- Third panel: The fall
- Fourth panel: God interrogates Adam and Eve
- Fifth panel: Expulsion from paradise
- Sixth panel: Life on earth

(door handle)

- Seventh panel: Cain and Abel make their offerings to God
- Eighth panel: Cain kills Abel

=== Right door ===
- Top panel: Noli me tangere; ascension of Christ into heaven
- Second panel: The women at the tomb
- Third panel: The crucifixion
- Fourth panel: Christ appears before Pilate and Herod
- Fifth panel: The child Jesus is brought to the Temple
- Sixth panel: The gifts of the Wise Men

(door handle)

- Seventh panel: The birth of Christ
- Eighth panel: The annunciation to Mary

=== Typological correlation ===
To understand the parallelism between the panels of the left and right doors, one must enter the medieval mindset, with its typological reading of the Old Testament according to the revelation of the New Testament (concordantia veteris et novi testamenti - harmony of the Old and New Testament). The typological concordances presented on the Bernward doors are based for the most part on the theological writings of the Church Fathers, especially St. Augustine:

Left door (Book of Genesis)	Right door (Life of Jesus)	Typological connection
God brings Adam to life, Adam pays homage (?) to God the Father	Noli me tangere / Ascension of Jesus	The creation of Adam prefigures the resurrection of Christ.
Meeting of Adam and Eve	The Women at the tomb	Adam and Eve correspond as a couple to Christ and the women at the tomb, who were interpreted in a figurative sense as the "Brides of Christ".
Fall of man	Crucifixion of Jesus	The Fall is the origin of original sin, which was repaid by the sacrificial death of Christ on the cross (1 Corinthians 15:22).
Interrogation and condemnation of Adam and Eve	Jesus interrogated by Herod and Pilate	While the banishment of Adam and Eve marked the beginning of a sinful, godless, and painful world, the condemnation of Christ brought salvation through the sacrifice on the cross. Adam and Eve deny their own debt, while Christ takes on the debt of others.
Expulsion from Paradise	Presentation of Jesus at the Temple	While Adam and Eve are driven from the "House of God" as a result of their sinfulness, Christ modelled the path to paradise for his followers in his presentation at the Temple.
Life of Adam and Eve on Earth	Adoration of the Magi	Mary as the "New Eve", who outweighs Eve's disobedience by her own obedience to God.
Sacrifices of Cain and Abel	Nativity of Christ	The lamb, which Abel sacrifices, refers to the incarnation of God as Christ and his divine purity.
Cain murders Abel	Annunciation	The murder of the righteous Abel foreshadows in his blood the death of God in his incarnation as Christ.

== Style and composition ==
The doors are made up of a number of framed panels; unlike the Roman originals, however, the design at Hildesheim is not their design, but probably an imitation of the ancient Roman examples. Moreover, the impact of the frames is significantly reduced in favour of the figural scenes by their narrowness and the flat relief, so that they appear like the images of a contemporary illustrated manuscript, like the Codex Aureus of Echternach.

=== Composition of the scenes ===
The composition of the individual scenes is simple and effective. In contrast to the dramatic depictions of Carolingian art, the artists avoided richly decorated backgrounds. The scenery, consisting of plants (especially on the left leaf) and architectural elements (mostly on the right leaf) are depicted in low relief and kept to a minimum. They are only there at all where they are necessary for comprehension of the scene or for compositional reasons. Instead, vast empty spaces provide negative space around the figures in the panels, to great effect. Alexander von Reitzenstein identified the empty space as an "effective space of corresponding gestures." With their movement and individual gestures, each figure interacts with others – none of the figures can be understood on their own, independent of their counterparts, without losing their meaning.

=== Figures ===
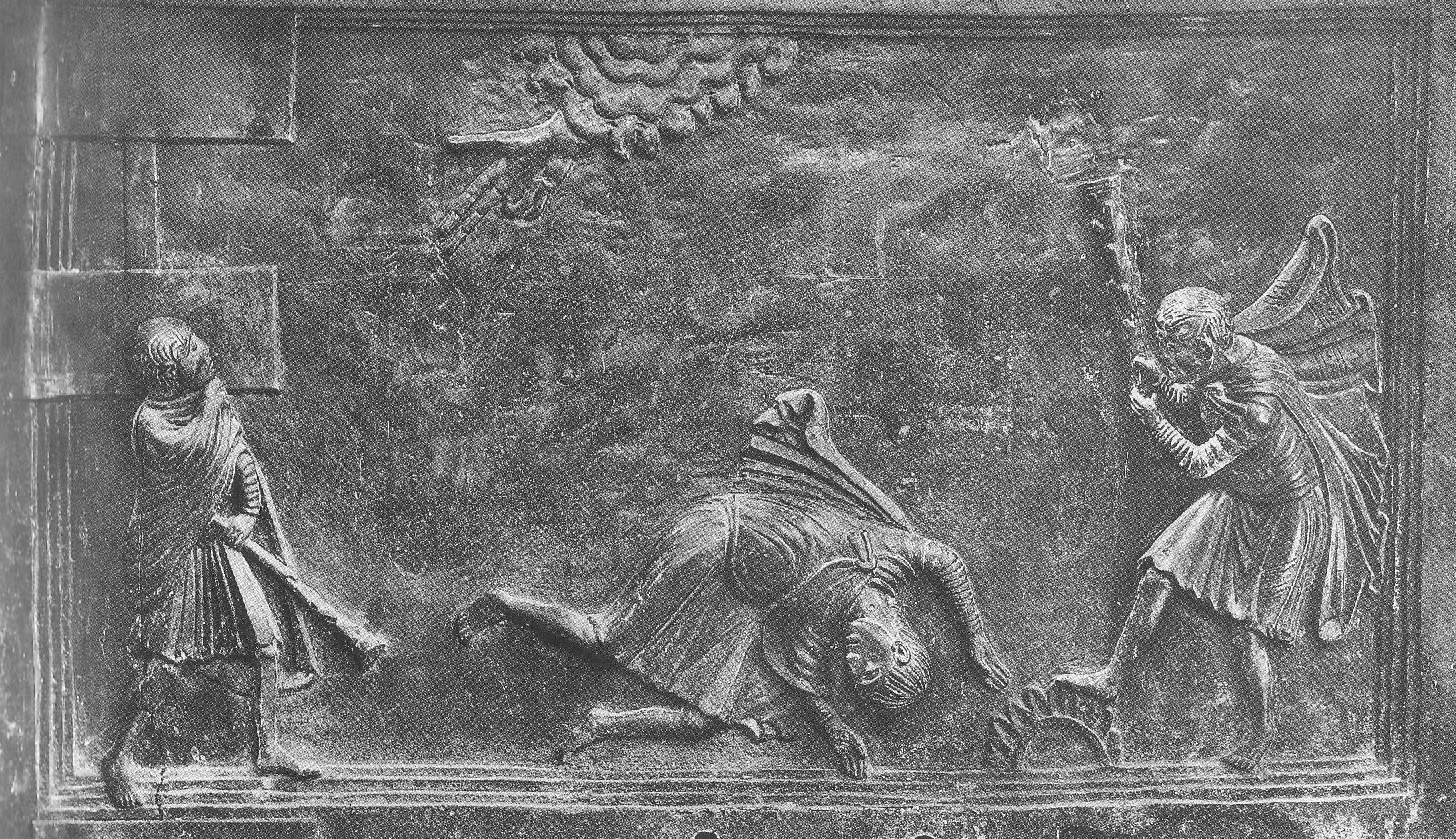
Detail of the left door leaf: Cain murders Abel

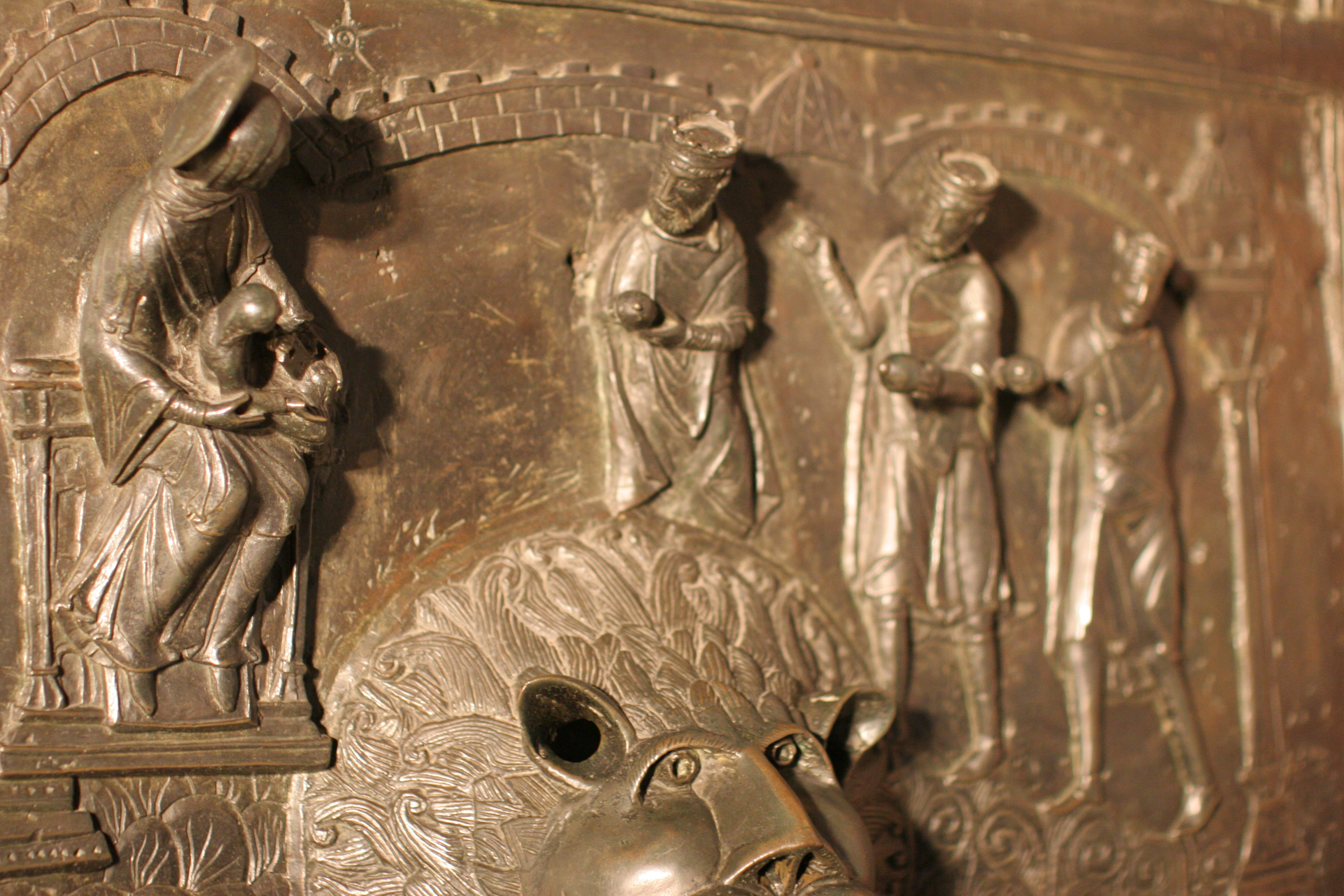
Detail of the right door leaf: The adoration of the Magi

As usual in medieval art, the figures are not individualized, but repeat a few stylised types. They have the disproportionately large, oval faces which are characteristic of Pre-Romanesque sculpture. Their very large, almond-shaped eyes sit in flat sockets with sharply delineated eyebrows. The hair is composed of parallel strands from a central parting. Nevertheless, the facial expressions of some figures are very individuated and match the figures' gestures. Especially relevant in this respect is the figure of Cain who looks up to the Hand of God in heaven with fearful, terror-stricken eyes and pulls his cloak tight around his body.

A progressive feature of the figures on the Bernward Doors is their style of relief: the figures do not extend a uniform distance from the background, but 'lean' out from it, so that when seen side on they almost give the impression of "roses on a trellis, with nodding heads." A particular apt example of this is the figure of Mary with the baby Jesus in the depiction of the Adoration of the Magi: while her lower body is still in low relief, her upper body and Christ project out further, and finally Mary's shoulders and head are cast in the round. This unusual style was used for artistic reasons, not because of technical limitations.

=== Identity of the artist ===
Unlike, for example, the Market Portal of the Mainz Cathedral, the identity of the artist responsible for the Bernward Doors is not preserved. As a result, older research attempted to identify a varying number of different artists on the basis of stylistic analysis of the individual panels. Rainer Kahsnitz has since put these attributions in doubt, since the differences in execution between the reliefs is so marginal that they might as easily be the result of technical requirements as different artistic styles. Probably a single artist was responsible for the creation of the Bernward Doors, with a small group of apprentices and assistants.

== Predecessors and later works ==
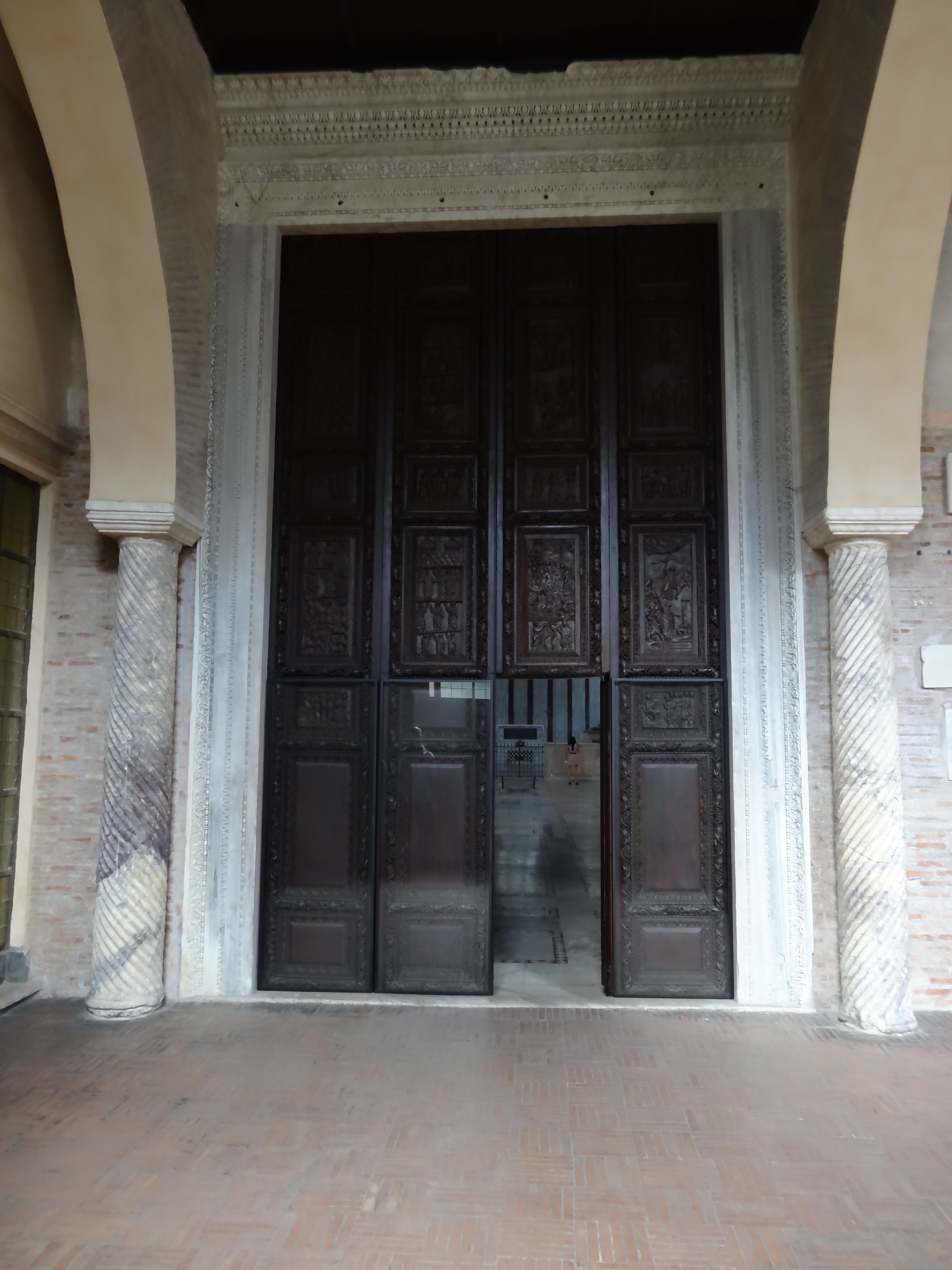
Wooden door of St. Sabina in Rome, c.430.

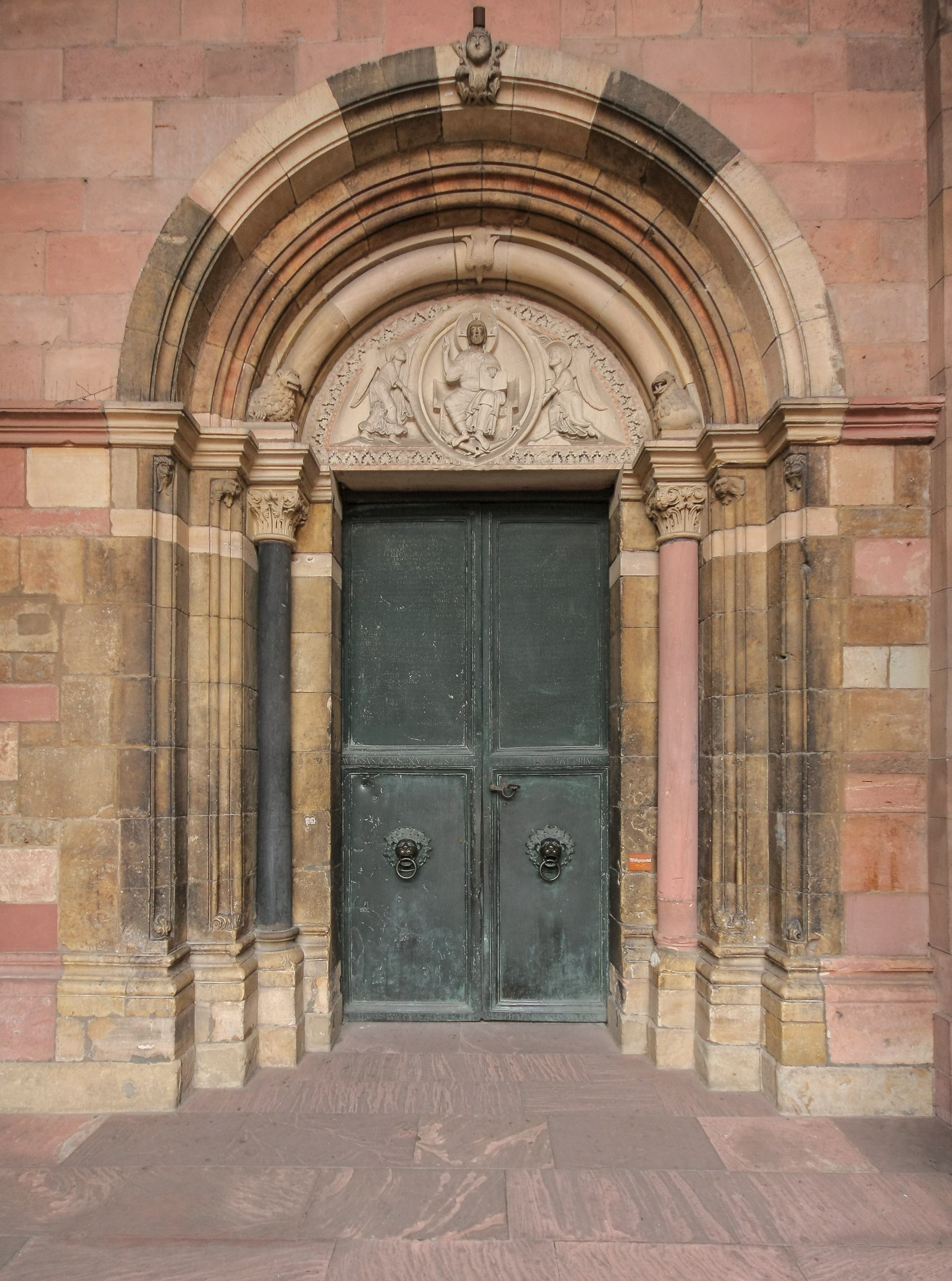
Bronze doors of the Marktportal, Mainz Cathedral c.1009.

There are various possibilities for the model of the Hildesheim doors as panelled doors (on the Roman model) and for the material used. Outstanding examples of monumental bronzeworking of the period include the doors of the Palatine chapel (c.800) and the doors of the Marktportal of Mainz Cathedral, which Archbishop Willigis had the founder Berenger cast in 1009. However, these doors have no figural decoration, except for door handles in the shape of lion's heads on the Aachen Wolfstür. As his biographer Thangmar reported in the Vita Bernwardi, Bishop Bernward lived first in the Hostel of the Schola Francorum at the Vatican and then in the Imperial Palace on the Palatine during his stay at Rome in 1001/2. He would have had the opportunity to view the monumental bronze door at the entrance to Old St. Peter's. He probably also saw the Late Antique wooden doors of Santa Sabina with their relief cycle in which Old and New Testament scenes are arranged opposite each other in a typology. The Late Antique doors of Sant'Ambrogio in Milan are also a possible model.

Franz Dibelius first pointed out the clear parallels between illumination of manuscripts in the time of Charles the Bald and the composition of the images and figures of the left door. Some scenes of the Bernward Doors, e.g. the creation of Adam or the earthly life of Adam and Eve are arranged nearly identically to the so-called Moutier-Grandval Bible (London, British Library, Ms Add. 10546). Significantly, this Late Carolingian manuscript came from Tours, where Bernward stayed in 1006, returning to Hildesheim a year later with expensive relics for the silver Cross of Bernward. Close parallels can also be seen with other significant manuscripts of the ninth century, such as the c.800 Alcuin Bible (Bamberg State Library, Msc.Bibl.1) and the Bible of Saint Paul Outside the Walls, created in 877 at Corbie Abbey (Rom, Abbazia di S. Paolo fuori le mura). That Bernward brought copies of famous Frankish bibles back from his travels is definitely not certain, but possible. The ivory cover of the Stammheim Missal (de), in which Alcuin presents a book to St. Martin of Tours, as the patron saint of his cloister, could derive from a bible of Tours acquired by Bernward. Rudolf Wesenberg drew further iconographic and stylistic connections, but with traditional frescos in St. Paul beyond the Walls and Old St. Peter's which Bernward could have seen while in Rome.

A range of further medieval bronze doors followed the Bernward Doors, but they have no clear connection with Hildesheim. The idea of casting the whole door from a single mold did not catch on - the most important metal doors are composed of a wooden frame with bronze panels inserted. One of the Gniezno Doors, made for Poland in about 1175, is also a single piece casting, but artistically much less sophisticated. This apparently proved too difficult, and for the other door 24 cast panels were soldered together. For the western doors of St. Paulus in Worms, in 1881, the sculptor Lorenz Gedon created a detailed replica of the Bernward Doors; unlike the original, these were made of cast iron and for reasons of space, the two highest images (the creation of Adam and the Ascension of Christ!) were not included. The Renaissance Florence Baptistery doors are the most famous doors in the tradition Bernward played an important role in reviving.

== Original location dispute ==
The "Angelic temple" named in the inscription has been identified by some scholars as Bernward's sepulchral church of the archangel St. Michael. According to them, the doors were originally hung in the south aisle (perhaps as two separate doors), in the cloisters, or in no longer extant westwork and were transferred to the Cathedral in 1035 for the new western entrance which Wolfhere (de) reports that Bishop Gotthard had made in his biography, Vita Godehardi. A combination of the previous hypothesis with the original location of the doors is provided by Wesenberg. Latterly, Bernhard Bruns attempted to locate the original location of the doors at St. Michael's by their iconography. The excavations carried out during renovations in 2006 have now demonstrated that St. Michael's never had a westwork. But the installation of the doors on the south aisle has also come into question, since foundation remains of a narthex were found there, next to the western stairway tower. Recent research in religious history now demonstrates templum angelicum was a liturgical form for a church dedicated to St. Michael.

Other scholars argue that the doors were in Hildesheim Cathedral from the beginning, in the westwork which is otherwise held to have first been built in 1035. Although the current west gallery has only been there since 1035, they argue that Bernward had already laid down a west building here, whose shape and appearance can no longer be reconstructed with confidence. Either Bernward would have had the previous west choir and the crypt underneath truncated to create space for a vestibule, where the Bernward Doors might have been installed or he would have had the west choir extended and installed the doors in the entrance to a chapel, which would have been built in front of the apse. Only a few hints in the foundations support the idea of a Bernwardian west gallery in the cathedral and they allow no more detailed conjecture about its layout.

Literary sources offer no evidence for Bernward's construction work on the cathedral. If the doors were located in the western part of the building, they would have had to have been moved pretty soon after, since the cathedral was drastically altered by his successors Gotthard, Azelin and Hezilo. A later period of drastic reconstruction of the western part of the building occurred in 1842–50. Later, the westwork was largely rebuilt after taking severe damage in an air raid during the Second World War. The modern plan of Wilhelm Fricke (which is not uncontroversial) is not based on the alleged layout of Bernward's time, but on the westwork of Minden Cathedral and the alleged appearance of Hildesheim cathedral's westwork under Bishop Hezilo (1054–61).

The leaves of the door escaped damage in the air raid of Hildesheim on 22 March 1945 only because they had been removed (at the initiative of the cathedral chapter) almost three years earlier, along with many other artworks of the cathedral. The leaves of the doors were taken to the so-called Kehrwieder wall in the southeast of the old city, where they spent the war underground. Since the doors weigh several tonnes, they had to be transported lying longwise in a stable scaffold by two teams of horses.

== Liturgical significance ==
According to the Hildesheim cathedral ordinarium of 1473 "On Ash Wednesday in the medium monasterii, the bishop performed the ash sprinkling and the expulsion of public penitents through the southwestern church doors. After that they departed from the cathedral barefoot with the clergy through the large bronze doors and after walking about they went back in through the same doors." The rite of the expulsion of the penitents in Lent derives its meaning from the banishment of Adam and Eve from Paradise shown on the doors. "The images of the left leaf with the creation of humanity, the fall of man and the story of Cain and Abel corresponds to the breviary reading (Genesis 1-5.5) on Septuagesima Sunday and the following week, which begins the pre-Lenten period." Thus in its original location, the door probably also served for the education of the penitents, who were restricted to the vestibule (Narthex or "Paradise") of the churchbuilding during Lent.

== Bibliography ==
- Silke von Berswordt-Wallrabe: Verflüchtigung und Konkretion. Die Malerei von Qiu Shihua - im Hinblick auf die Bernwardtür, in: übergänge | transitions. Gotthard Graubner - Bernwardtür - Qiu Shihua, hg. v. Michael Brandt u. Gerd Winner, Hildesheim 2014, S. 48–57.
- Michael Brandt: Bernwards Tür – Schätze aus dem Dom zu Hildesheim, Verlag Schnell & Steiner GmbH, Regensburg 2010, ISBN 978-3-7954-2045-1
- Bernhard Bruns: Die Bernwardstür – Tür zur Kirche. Bernward, Hildesheim 1992, ISBN 3-87065-725-1
- Aloys Butzkamm (2004), Ein Tor zum Paradies. Kunst und Theologie auf der Bronzetür des Hildesheimer Doms, Paderborn: Bonifatius, ISBN 3-89710-275-7 162 pages, many black and white illustrations, one colour foldout.

Abstract: The work is dedicated mostly to the iconographic and theological meaning of the scenes, but in an introductory chapter it also offers an overview of previous scholarship and a historical background from which the Hildesheim doors emerged.

- Franz Dibelius (1907), Die Bernwardstür zu Hildesheim, Strassburg: Heitz152 pages, 3 black and white images, 16 tables.

Abstract: Despite its age, the work remains relevant for the most part.

- Hans Drescher (1993), "Zur Technik bernwardinischer Silber- und Bronzegüsse", in Michael Brandt, Arne Eggebrecht (ed.), Bernward von Hildesheim und das Zeitalter der Ottonen: Ausst. Kat. Dom- und Diözesanmuseum Hildesheim, Roemer- und Pelizaeus-Museum 1993, vol. Band 1, Mainz: Philipp von Zabern, pp. 337–351, ISBN 3-8053-1567-814 pages, 14 black and white images and illustrations.

Abstract: This publication deals primarily with the technical aspects, material composition and workshop operations of silver and bronz casting under Bernward. The focus is on the Bernward Doors and the Bernward Column.

- Michael Fehr (1978), Zur Ikonographie und Erzählstruktur der Hildesheimer Bronzetüren, Bochum 184 pages, 25 drawings by the author.

Abstract: As well as an analysis of the narrative structure of the images on the Bernward doors, this work also justifies the interpretation of the first scene on the left leaf, which had hitherto not been clearly explained, as a depiction of the creation of Adam and Eve.
pdf-Datei der Monographie

- Kurd Fleige (1993), "Die Symbolbedeutung des Baumes in der romanischen Kunst - Erläutert an den Skulpturen der Bernwardstür in Hildesheim", in Kurd Fleige (ed.), Kirchenkunst, Kapitellsymbolik und profane Bauten: Ausgewählte Aufsätze zur Bau- und Kunstgeschichte Hildesheims und seiner Umgebung, Hildesheim: Bernward-Verlag GmbH, pp. 37–50, ISBN 3-87065-793-614 pages, 13 black and white images.

Abstract: The publication deals with the symbolism of the depiction of trees on the doors, considering each of the scenes relationship to each other.

- Bernhard Gallistl (1990), Die Bronzetüren Bischof Bernwards im Dom zu Hildesheim, Freiburg im Breisgau: Herder, ISBN 3-451-21983-296 pages, 50 colour and 9 black and white images.

Abstract: The work synthesis previous scholarship, but without references. In the description of the individual scenes the focus is on the theological and iconographic connections: the perfection of the creation of man and woman by Christ and his church.

- Bernhard Gallistl (2000), Der Dom zu Hildesheim und sein Weltkulturerbe. Bernwardstür und Christussäule, Hildesheim: Olms, ISBN 3-89366-500-5145 pages, many black and white images and details.

Abstract: The work deals with the production of bronzeworks under Bernward at Hildesheim. The main focus here too is on the description of individual scenes in theological and iconographic terms.

- Bernhard Gallistl (2007–2008), "In Faciem Angelici Templi. Kultgeschichtliche Bemerkungen zu Inschrift und ursprünglicher Platzierung der Bernwardstür.", Jahrbuch für Geschichte und Kunst im Bistum Hildesheim, 75./76.: 59–92

Abstract: The author finds that the expression (arch)angelicum templum specifically signifies the angel's patronage in the imperial sanctuary of St. Michael at Constantinople and at Chonai in Asia Minor, the major pilgrimage site for St. Michael in Christendom.

- Richard Hoppe-Sailer: Farbe - Fläche - Körper - Raum. Gotthard Graubners Gemälde im Dialog mit der Hildesheimer Bernwardtür, in: übergänge | transitions. Gotthard Graubner - Bernwardtür - Qiu Shihua, hg. v. Michael Brandt u. Gerd Winner, Hildesheim 2014, S. 6-15.
- Rainer Kahsnitz (1993), "Bronzetüren in Dom", in Michael Brandt, Arne Eggebrecht (ed.), Bernward von Hildesheim und das Zeitalter der Ottonen: Ausst. Kat. Dom- und Diözesanmuseum Hildesheim, Roemer- und Pelizaeus-Museum 1993, vol. Band 2, Mainz: Philipp von Zabern, pp. 503–512, ISBN 3-8053-1567-810 pages, 3 colour tables.

Abstract: Critical synthesis of the scholarly literature with bibliography.

- Karl Bernhard Kruse (2008), "Zum Phantom der Westhalle in St.Michaelis, Hildesheim", in Christiane Segers-Glocke (ed.), St. Michaelis in Hildesheim - Forschungsergebnisse zur bauarchäologischen Untersuchung im Jahr 2006 = Arbeitshefte zur Denkmalpflege in Niedersachsen 34, Hameln: C.W. Niemeyer Buchverlage GmbH, pp. 144–159, ISBN 978-3-8271-8034-616 pages, 22 colour images.

Abstract: Discussion of the results of excavation in the west choir of St. Michael.

- Renate Maas: Bernwards Tür als Ereignis der Gegenwart, in: übergänge | transitions. Gotthard Graubner - Bernwardtür - Qiu Shihua, hg. v. Michael Brandt u. Gerd Winner, Hildesheim 2014, S. 20–29.
- Renate Maas, Hans Jantzens Analyse ottonischer Kunst: Der Bildraum als Symbol historischen Anfangs und ontologischen Ursprungs. In: Ingrid Baumgärtner et al. (Hg.), Raumkonzepte. Göttingen: V&R unipress, 2009, S. 95-123.
- Rudolf Wesenberg (1955), Bernwardinische Plastik. Zur ottonischen Kunst unter Bischof Bernward von Hildesheim, Berlin: Deutscher Verein für Kunstwissenschaft, pp. 65–116, 172–181 190 pages, many black and white images and diagrams, 77 black and white tables.

Abstract: Older but still fundamental work on Bernwardian sculpture, which contains a detailed critical analysis and numerous black and white detail shots of the Bernward doors. In the appendix there is an extensive treatment of the manufacturing details and original location of the doors.
