= Thangmar =

German chronicler

Thangmar (or Thankmar) (c.950- c.1003) was a German historian.

== Life ==
His first appearance in history is as the head of the cathedral school at Hildesheim; at a later date he became dean of the Hildesheim Cathedral, and being at the same time notary and librarian his position was a very important one. Thangmar was distinguished both as a scholar and a statesman; he taught several bishops including Bernward of Hildesheim, Meinwerk of Paderborn, and Benno of Meissen, as well as the Emperor Henry II. He exercised great influence over Bernward of Hildesheim, and a large part of the affairs under episcopal control were directed by him.

In 1000 he accompanied Bernward to Rome, and was sent several times to the imperial court as the representative of the bishop to settle important matters, being highly esteemed by Emperor Otto III.

== Works ==
After the death of Bernward in 1022 he wrote an account of the active and varied life of the bishop, a biography for which he had already gathered the material and of which he had probably written the first ten chapters during the years 1008–13. He had been an eye-witness of many of the events he relates and had taken as active part in all important measures. As he says himself, Bernward trusted him as a child does its father. Consequently, his Vita Bernwardi is one of the finest biographical productions of the Middle Ages, and is also one of the most valuable authorities for an important period of German history.

He displays much affection for the dead bishop, and has written a plain and simple narrative, unrhetorical and truthful. It is only in the account of the dispute between the Archbishops of Hildesheim and Mainz as to the right of jurisdiction over Gandesheim that Thangmar appears at times to be a partisan of Bernward. Editions:

- Mon. Germ. Hist.: Scriptores, IV, 757-782;
- Migne, Patrologia Latina, CXL, 393–436.

The life has been edited in German by Hüffer (Berlin, 1857), and by Wattenbach (Leipzig, 1892).
