= Kessel, Germany =

Village in North Rhine-Westphalia, Germany

Coordinates: 51°42′26″N 6°04′30″E

Kessel is a village in the municipality of Goch, Kreis Kleve in the German State of North Rhine-Westphalia.

The village has 2,129 inhabitants. Like Goch, Kessel is also situated at the banks of the river Niers.

In addition to the central village, the townships of Nergena and Grunewald also belong to it.

The western boundary of the village also forms the country-border with the Netherlands,

namely the villages Ottersum and Gennep. In the northwest the Reichswald is the demarcation.

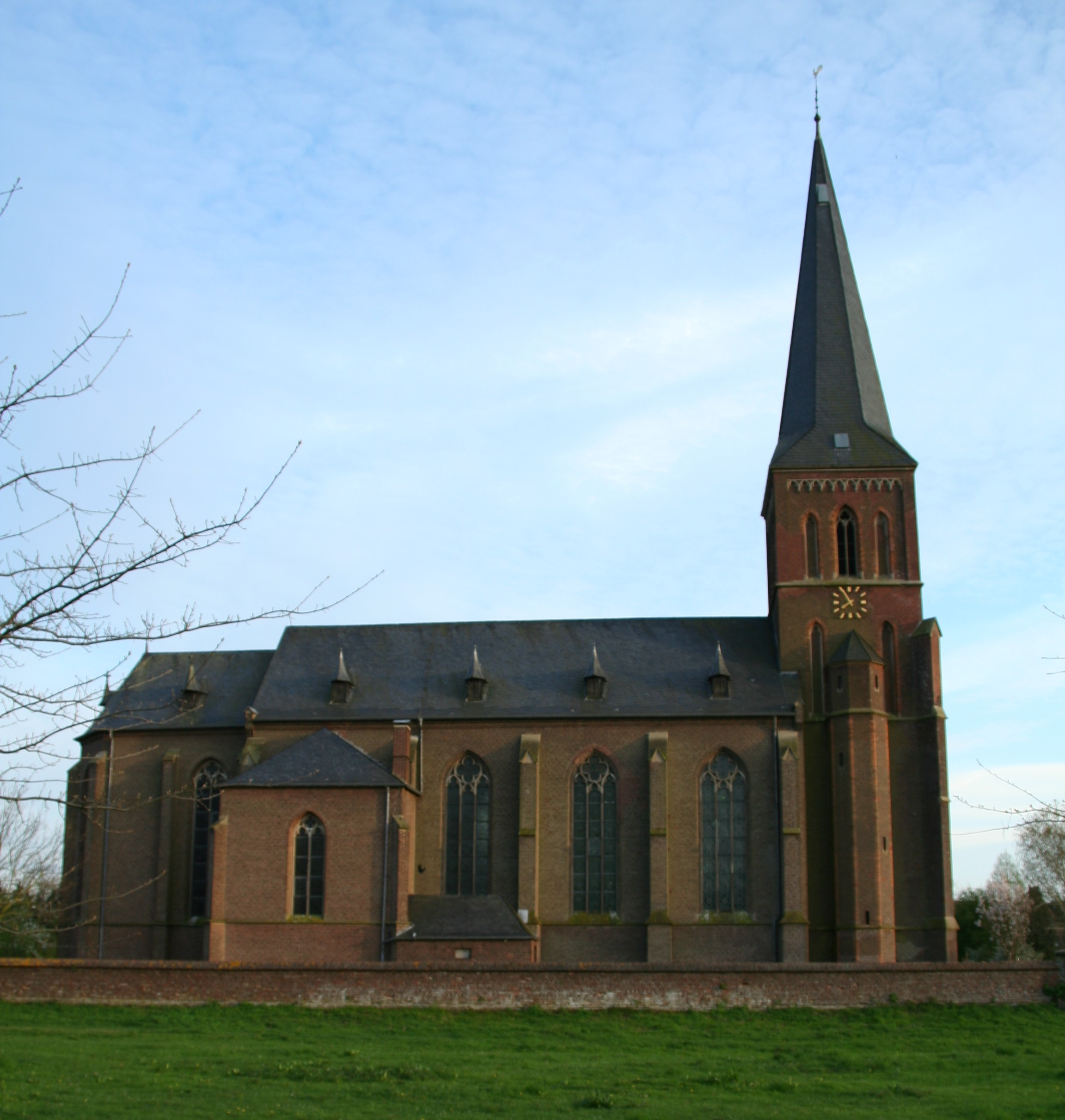

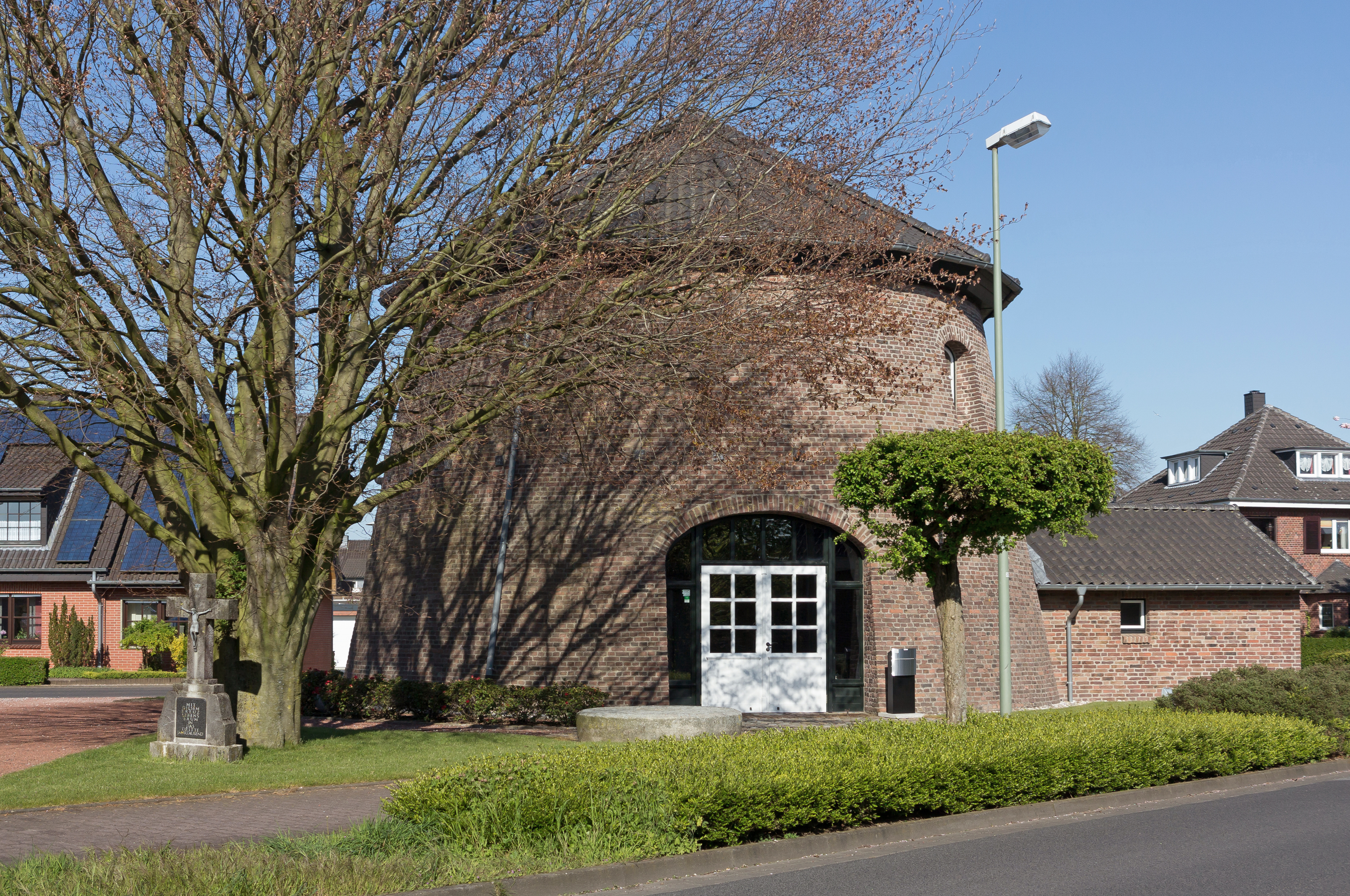

== History ==
Otto III, Holy Roman Emperor, was probably born here in June/July 980.
