= List of popes by country =

This page is a list of popes by country of origin and nationality. There have been 265 (Note: There have been 267 papacies, since Pope Benedict IX (1032–1044; 1045; 1047–1048) was elected pope three times.) popes, from the continents of Asia, Europe, Africa, South America, and North America. Since the office of pope has existed for almost two millennia, many of the countries of origin of popes no longer exist, and so they are grouped under three periods: the Roman Empire period, the Middle Ages to modernity, and since the creation of Vatican City with the 1929 Lateran Treaty. Countries are listed in chronological order within each section.

== Statistical overview ==
As of 2025, 265 men have been pope, with at least one pope hailing (in chronological order) from Asia (9), Europe (251), Africa (3), or the Americas (2). Every pope since Pope Pius XI has been a citizen of Vatican City (established in the 1929 Lateran Treaty). (Note: Pope Pius XI, Pope Pius XII, Pope John XXIII, Pope Paul VI, Pope John Paul I, Pope John Paul II, Pope Benedict XVI, Pope Francis, and Pope Leo XIV have all been Vatican citizens.)

- 217 popes are from contemporary Italy, starting with the second Pope Linus, including all popes with the names Pius, Boniface, and Paul, Pope Benedict IX, and most recently Pope John Paul I.
  - Most of these were ethnic Italians, but 5 were ethnic Greeks (Pope Telesphorus, Pope Anterus, Pope Zosimus, Pope John VI, and Pope John VII).
  - 4 Italian citizens later became naturalized citizens of Vatican City: Pope Pius XII, Pope John XXIII, Pope Paul VI, and Pope John Paul I.
- 17 from France and from the Holy Roman Empire in contemporary France, including Savoy: Pope Sylvester II, Pope Leo IX, Pope Stephen IX, Pope Nicholas II, Pope Urban II, Pope Callistus II, Pope Urban IV, Pope Clement IV, Pope Innocent V, Pope Martin IV, Pope Clement V, Pope John XXII, Pope Benedict XII, Pope Clement VI, Pope Innocent VI, Pope Urban V, and Pope Gregory XI.
- 9 ethnic Greeks, with 4 each from contemporary Greece and Italy, while Pope John VI was from contemporary Turkey.
  - 4 from contemporary Greece: Pope Anacletus, Pope Hyginus, Pope Eleutherius, Pope Sixtus II.
  - 4 from contemporary Italy: Pope Telesphorus, Pope Anterus, Pope Zosimus, and Pope John VII.
  - 1 from contemporary Turkey: Pope John VI
- 6 from Provincia Syria or Bilad al-Sham, contemporary Syria and Lebanon: the first pope commonly known as Saint Peter, Pope Anicetus, Pope John V, Pope Sergius I, Pope Constantine, and Pope Gregory III. (Note: The first pope Saint Peter was a native of Bethsaida, in the contemporary Golan Heights.)
- 4 from Germany and from the Holy Roman Empire in contemporary Germany: Pope Clement II, Pope Damasus II, Pope Victor II, and Pope Benedict XVI.
- 3 from Africa Proconsularis, contemporary Tunisia, western Libya, and eastern Algeria: Pope Victor I, Pope Miltiades, Pope Gelasius I.
- 2 from the Holy Land, contemporary Israel, Palestine, and Syria: Pope Evaristus and Pope Theodore I.
- 2 from Dalmatia in contemporary Croatia: Pope Caius and Pope John IV.
- 2 from Spain: Pope Callixtus III and Pope Alexander VI.
- 2 from Portugal: Pope Damasus I and Pope John XXI.
- 2 from Anatolia, contemporary Turkey: Pope Conon and Pope John VI.
- 1 from the Holy Roman Empire in contemporary Austria: Pope Gregory V.
- 1 from the Holy Roman Empire in the contemporary Netherlands: Pope Adrian VI.
- 1 from England in the contemporary United Kingdom: Pope Adrian IV.
- 1 from Poland: Pope John Paul II.
- 1 from Argentina: Pope Francis.
- 1 from the United States: Pope Leo XIV.

=== Table of popes by country ===
Country	Number of popes	Year of last papacy
Africa Province (Roman Empire)	3	496
Croatia (Kingdom of the Lombards); Dalmatia	2	642
Judaea Province (Roman Empire); Byzantine Palestine	3	649
Asia Minor	2	705
Roman Greece and Byzantine Greece	5	687
Roman/Byzantine Syria, and Bilad al-Sham	7	741
Austrian part of Holy Roman Empire	1	999
England part of United Kingdom	1	1159
Lusitania (Roman Empire) and Portugal	2	1277
Kingdom of France (medieval); French part of Holy Roman Empire	17	1378
Spain (Valencia in the Crown of Aragon)	2	1503
Dutch part of Holy Roman Empire	1	1523
Italian Peninsula (see below)	217	1978
Vatican City	9	current (Note: No pope was born in Vatican City, all of them are naturalized citizens of Vatican City.)
Poland	1	2005
German part of Holy Roman Empire; Contemporary Germany	4	2013
Argentina	1	2025
United States	1	current (Note: The current Pope Leo XIV was born in the United States and obtained citizenship with Peru in 2015 and Vatican City in 2023.)
Total	265	

== Popes from the Roman Empire ==
These subsections of popes from the Western and Eastern Roman Empires are listed in chronological order.

=== Syria ===
These popes are from the Roman and Byzantine province of Syria, or the Umayyad Caliphate province of Bilad al-Sham, corresponding to the modern country of Syria. Pope Peter (c. 30 – c. 67) was a native of Bethsaida, in the contemporary Golan Heights, and became the first Bishop of Rome (Pope). Pope Sergius I (687–701) was born to a Syrian family in Sicily, and is also listed under Byzantine Italy. Pope Gregory III (731–741) was the last pope from outside Europe until Pope Francis (2013–2025).

- Pope Peter (64–68), of Bethsaida
- Pope Anicetus (c. 154–167), of Emesa (modern Homs)
- Pope John V (685–686), of Antioch
- Pope Sergius I (687–701), a Syrian Sicilian
- Pope Sisinnius (708); little is known about him, but his father was Syrian
- Pope Constantine (708–715), of Tyre, Lebanon
- Pope Gregory III (731–749), of Syria

=== Italy ===
==== Roman Italy ====
Pope Linus (64/67(?)–76/79 (?)) succeeded Peter as the second pope, becoming the first European pope.

- Pope Linus (64/67(?)–76/79 (?))
- Pope Anacletus (76/79(?)–88)
- Pope Clement I (88/92–97/101)
- Pope Alexander I (c.106–c.115)
- Pope Sixtus I (117/119(?)–126/128(?)
- Pope Pius I (c. 140 – c. 154)
- Pope Soter (c. 166 – 174/175)
- Pope Zephyrinus (199–217)
- Pope Callixtus I (c. 217 – 222)
- Pope Pontian (230–235)
- Pope Urban I (222–230)
- Pope Fabian (236–250)
- Pope Cornelius (251–253)
- Pope Lucius I (253–254)
- Pope Stephen I (254–257)
- Pope Felix I (269–274)
- Pope Eutychian (275–283)
- Pope Marcellinus (296–304?)
- Pope Marcellus I (308–309)
- Pope Eusebius (309/310)
- Pope Sylvester I (314–335)
- Pope Mark (336)
- Pope Julius I (337–352)
- Pope Liberius (352–366)
- Pope Siricius (384–399)
- Pope Anastasius I (399–401)
- Pope Innocent I (401–417)
- Pope Boniface I (418–422)
- Pope Celestine I (422–432)
- Pope Sixtus III (432–440)
- Pope Leo I (440–461)
- Pope Hilarius (461–468)
- Pope Simplicius (468–483)
- Pope Felix III (483–492)
- Pope Anastasius II (496–498)
- Pope Symmachus (498–514)
- Pope Silverius (536–537)

==== Byzantine Italy ====
- Pope Pelagius I (556–561)
- Pope John III (561–574)
- Pope Benedict I (575–579)
- Pope Pelagius II (579–590)
- Pope Gregory I (590–604)
- Pope Sabinian (604–606)
- Pope Boniface III (607)
- Pope Boniface IV (608–615)
- Pope Adeodatus I (615–618)
- Pope Boniface V (619–625)
- Pope Honorius I (625–638)
- Pope Severinus (636–640)
- Pope Martin I (649–653)
- Pope Eugene I (654–657)
- Pope Vitalian (657–672)
- Pope Adeodatus II (672–676)
- Pope Donus (676–678)
- Pope Agatho (678–681)
- Pope Leo II (682–683)
- Pope Benedict II (684–685)
- Pope Sergius I (687–701)
- Pope Gregory II (715–731)
- Pope Zachary (741–752)
- Pope Stephen II (752–757)
- Pope Stephen III (768–772)
- Pope Stephen IV (816–817)
- Pope Stephen VIII (939-942)

==== Byzantine Sicily ====
- Pope Conon (686–687), Greek ethnicity
- Pope Sergius I (687–701), Syrian ethnicity

=== Greeks ===
These popes are considered ethnic Greeks, though most are from other parts of Magna Graecia, rather than modern Greece.

- Pope Anacletus (80–92), a native of Rome
- Pope Telesphorus (126–137), from Calabria, Italy
- Pope Hyginus (c. 138 – c. 142), from Athens
- Pope Eleuterus (174/175–189), from Epirus, Greece
- Pope Anterus (235–236), from Calabria
- Pope Sixtus II (257–258), possibly from Greece
- Pope Zosimus (417–418), from Calabria
- Pope John VI (701–705), from Ephesus (in modern Turkey)
- Pope John VII (705–707), from Calabria

=== Roman Judaea ===
Pope Peter (c. 30 – c. 67) was born in Bethsaida, Roman Syria before the creation of Judaea Province, in the contemporary Golan Heights. Pope Evaristus (c. 99 – c. 107) was born in Bethlehem, in the contemporary West Bank. Pope Theodore I (642–649) was born in Jerusalem.

- Pope Peter (c. 30 – c. 67)
- Pope Evaristus (c. 99 – c. 107)
- Pope Theodore I (642–649)

=== Roman Africa ===
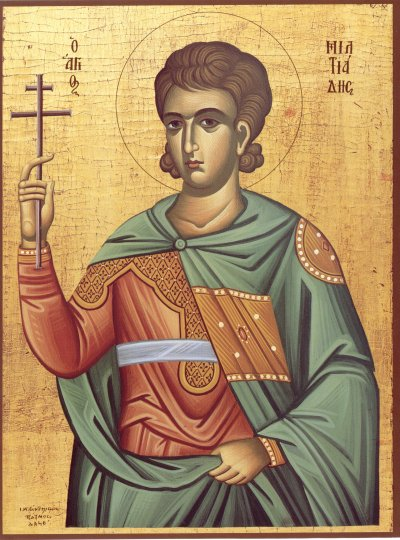
Roman African Pope Miltiades.

These popes are from the Roman province of Africa, which corresponds to the coastal parts of Tunisia, Libya and Algeria. Pope Victor I (189–199) was the first African pope and was of Berber origin.

- Pope Victor I (189–199)
- Pope Miltiades (311–314)
- Pope Gelasius I (492–496)

=== Roman Dalmatia ===
Dalmatia was at the time part of the Roman and Byzantine Empires. It is now part of the contemporary Republic of Croatia.

- Pope Caius (283–296)
- Pope John IV (640–642)

=== Roman Lusitania ===
Lusitania corresponds to present-day Portugal and the southwest part of Spain.

- Pope Damasus I (366–384)

=== Byzantine Anatolia ===
Anatolia, or Asia Minor, was at the time part of the Roman and Byzantine Empires. All popes from here were born during the Byzantine period, in areas now part of the contemporary Republic of Turkey.

- Pope Conon (686–687)
- Pope John VI (655–705)

== Popes from the Middle Ages to modernity ==
The current concept of sovereignty emerged after the 1648 Peace of Westphalia, collectively known as Westphalian sovereignty. However, some historians have argued against this, suggesting that such views emerged during the nineteenth and twentieth century in relation to concerns about sovereignty during that time. These Westphalian states are listed below in chronological order.

=== Italy ===
Italy, from the beginning of the Middle Ages until the proclamation of the Kingdom of Italy, was divided into numerous city-states and other political entities. Among these, the Papal States were the birthplace of most of the popes. Other Italian states where more popes were born were the Republic of Venice, the Kingdom of Naples, the Republic of Genoa, the Duchy of Milan and the Florentine Republic and its successor the Grand Duchy of Tuscany.

==== Ostrogothic Kingdom ====
- Pope Hormisdas (514–523)
- Pope John I (523–526)
- Pope Felix IV (526–530)
- Pope Boniface II (530–532)
- Pope John II (533–535)
- Pope Agapetus I (535–536)
- Pope Vigilius (537–555)

==== Papal States ====
- Pope Paul I (757–767)
- Pope Adrian I (772–795)
- Pope Leo III (795–816)
- Pope Paschal I (817–824)
- Pope Eugene II (824–827)
- Pope Valentine (827)
- Pope Gregory IV (827–844)
- Pope Sergius II (844–847)
- Pope Leo IV (847–855)
- Pope Benedict III (855–858)
- Pope Nicholas I (858–867)
- Pope Adrian II (867–872)
- Pope John VIII (872–882)
- Pope Marinus I (882–884)
- Pope Adrian III (884–885)
- Pope Stephen V (885–891)
- Pope Formosus (891–896)
- Pope Boniface VI (896)
- Pope Stephen VI (896–897)
- Pope Romanus (897)
- Pope Theodore II (897)
- Pope John IX (898–900)
- Pope Benedict IV (900–903)
- Pope Leo V (903)
- Pope Sergius III (904–911)
- Pope Anastasius III (911–913)
- Pope Lando (913–914)
- Pope John X (914–928)
- Pope Leo VI (928)
- Pope Stephen VII (928–931)
- Pope John XI (931–935)
- Pope Leo VII (936–939)
- Pope Marinus II (942–946)
- Pope Agapetus II (946–955)
- Pope John XII (955–964)
- Pope Benedict V (964)
- Pope Leo VIII (963–965)
- Pope John XIII (965–972)
- Pope Benedict VI (973–974)
- Pope Benedict VII (974–983)
- Pope John XV (985–996)
- Pope John XVII (1003)
- Pope John XVIII (1004–1009)
- Pope Sergius IV (1009–1012)
- Pope Benedict VIII (1012–1024)
- Pope John XIX (1024–1032)
- Pope Benedict IX (1032-1044; 1045; 1047-1048)
- Pope Sylvester III (1045)
- Pope Gregory VI (1045–1046)
- Pope Paschal II (1099–1118)
- Pope Honorius II (1124–1130)
- Pope Innocent II (1130–1143)
- Pope Celestine II (1143–1144)
- Pope Lucius II (1144–1145)
- Pope Anastasius IV (1153–1154)
- Pope Gregory VIII (1187)
- Pope Clement III (1187–1191)
- Pope Celestine III (1191–1198)
- Pope Innocent III (1198–1216)
- Pope Honorius III (1216–1227)
- Pope Gregory IX (1227–1241)
- Pope Alexander IV (1254–1261)
- Pope Nicholas III (1277–1280)
- Pope Honorius IV (1285–1287)
- Pope Nicholas IV (1288–1292)
- Pope Boniface VIII (1294–1303)
- Pope Martin V (1417–1431)
- Pope Paul III (1534–1549)
- Pope Julius III (1550–1555)
- Pope Marcellus II (1555)
- Pope Gregory XIII (1572–1585)
- Pope Sixtus V (1585–1590)
- Pope Urban VII (1590)
- Pope Innocent IX (1591)
- Pope Clement VIII (1592–1605)
- Pope Paul V (1605–1621)
- Pope Gregory XV (1621–1623)
- Pope Innocent X (1644–1655)
- Pope Clement X (1670–1676)
- Pope Clement XI (1700–1721)
- Pope Innocent XIII (1721–1724)
- Pope Benedict XIV (1740–1758)
- Pope Clement XIV (1769–1774)
- Pope Pius VI (1775–1799)
- Pope Pius VII (1800–1823)
- Pope Leo XII (1823–1829)
- Pope Pius VIII (1829–1830)
- Pope Pius IX (1846–1878)
- Pope Leo XIII (1878–1903) (Note: Pope Leo XIII was born in Rome while it was under Napoleonic French occupation.)

==== Italy, Holy Roman Empire ====
- Pope John XIV (983–984)
- Pope Alexander II (1061–1073)
- Pope Gregory VII (1073–1085)
- Pope Eugene III (1145–1153)
- Pope Alexander III (1159–1181)
- Pope Lucius III (1181–1185)
- Pope Urban III (1185–1187)
- Pope Celestine IV (1241)
- Pope Gregory X (1271–1276)
- Pope Benedict XI (1303–1304)

==== Former Italian states with one pope ====
- Pope Victor III (1086–1087) (Duchy of Benevento)
- Pope Gelasius II (1118–1119) (Duchy of Gaeta)
- Pope Celestine V (1294) (Kingdom of Sicily)
- Pope Benedict XV (1914–1922) (Kingdom of Sardinia)

==== Republic of Genoa ====
- Pope Innocent IV (1243–1254)
- Pope Adrian V (1276)
- Pope Nicholas V (1447–1455)
- Pope Sixtus IV (1471–1484)
- Pope Innocent VIII (1484–1492)
- Pope Julius II (1503–1513)

==== Kingdom of Naples ====
- Pope Urban VI (1378–1389)
- Pope Boniface IX (1389–1404)
- Pope Innocent VII (1404–1406)
- Pope Paul IV (1555–1559)
- Pope Innocent XII (1691–1700)
- Pope Benedict XIII (1724–1730)

==== Republic of Venice ====
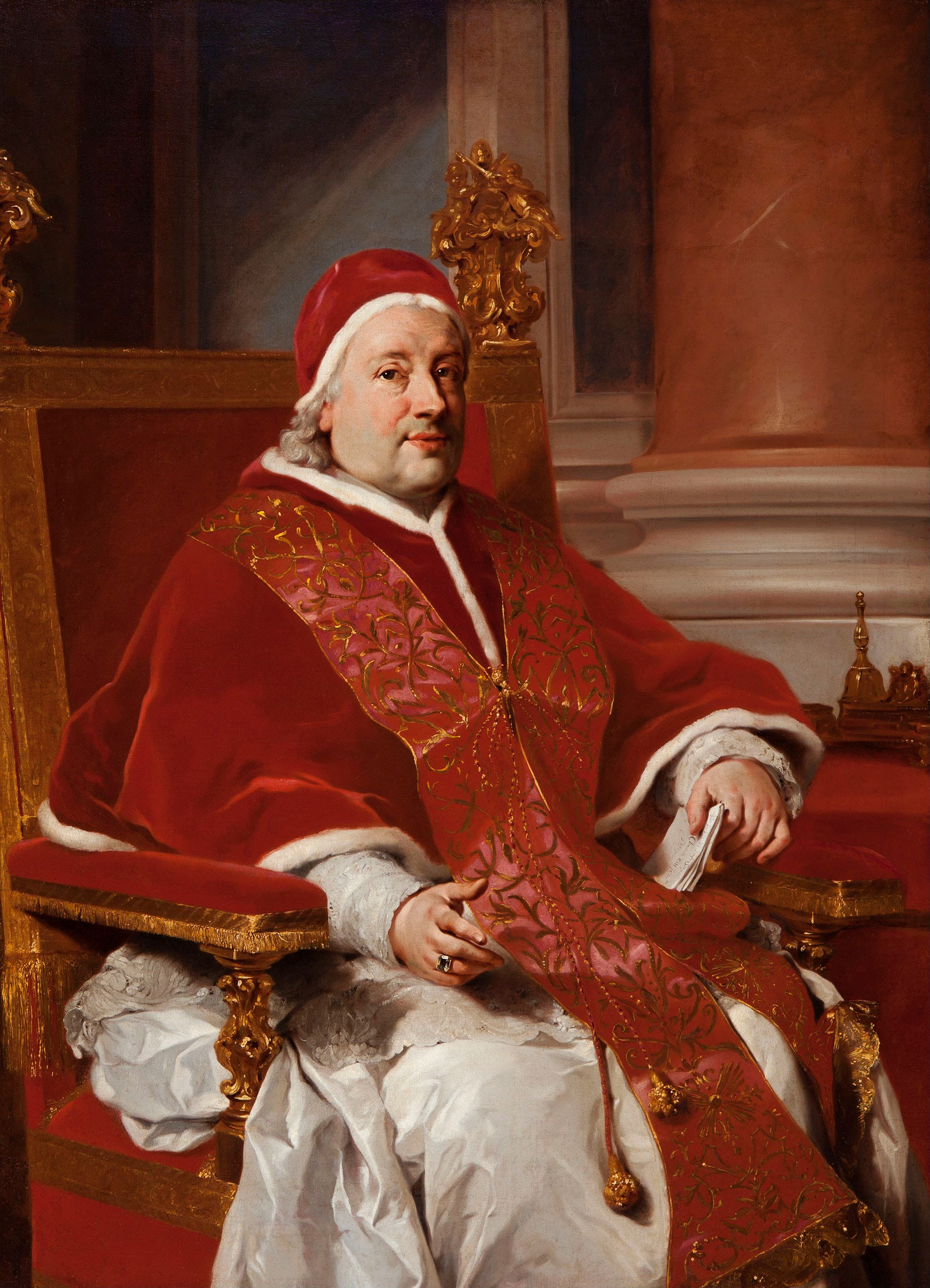
Venetian Pope Clement XIII

- Pope Gregory XII (1406–1415)
- Pope Eugene IV (1431–1447)
- Pope Paul II (1464–1471)
- Pope Alexander VIII (1689–1691)
- Pope Clement XIII (1758–1769)
- Pope Gregory XVI (1831–1846)

==== Republic of Siena ====
- Pope Pius II (1458–1464)
- Pope Pius III (1503)

==== Republic of Florence, Duchy of Florence, Grand Duchy of Tuscany ====
- Pope Leo X (1513–1521)
- Pope Clement VII (1523–1534)
- Pope Leo XI (1605)
- Pope Urban VIII (1623–1644)
- Pope Alexander VII (1655–1667)
- Pope Clement IX (1667–1669)
- Pope Clement XII (1730–1740)

==== Duchy of Milan ====
- Pope Pius IV (1559–1565)
- Pope Pius V (1566–1572)
- Pope Gregory XIV (1590–1591)
- Pope Innocent XI (1676–1689)

==== Kingdom of Lombardy-Venetia ====
These two popes were born in the Lombardo-Venetian Kingdom, part of the Austrian Empire until 1866 when it was ceded to Italy.

- Pope Pius X (1903–1914)
- Pope Pius XI (1922–1939)

=== Austria ===
The medieval Duchy of Carinthia was part of the Holy Roman Empire. It is now largely part of contemporary Austria. The Salian, Pope Gregory V is sometimes referred to as "the first German pope" or as "the only Austrian pope". However, German or Austrian national identities did not exist yet during the High Middle Ages.

- Pope Gregory V (996–999) (Duchy of Carinthia)

=== France ===
France is the most common non-Italian papal country of origin. Seventeen popes were born in present-day France, all in the second half of the medieval era. The indicated seven popes of the Avignon Papacy were all from France. Since the end of the Avignon Papacy, no French person has been elected pope.

==== Kingdom of France (medieval) ====
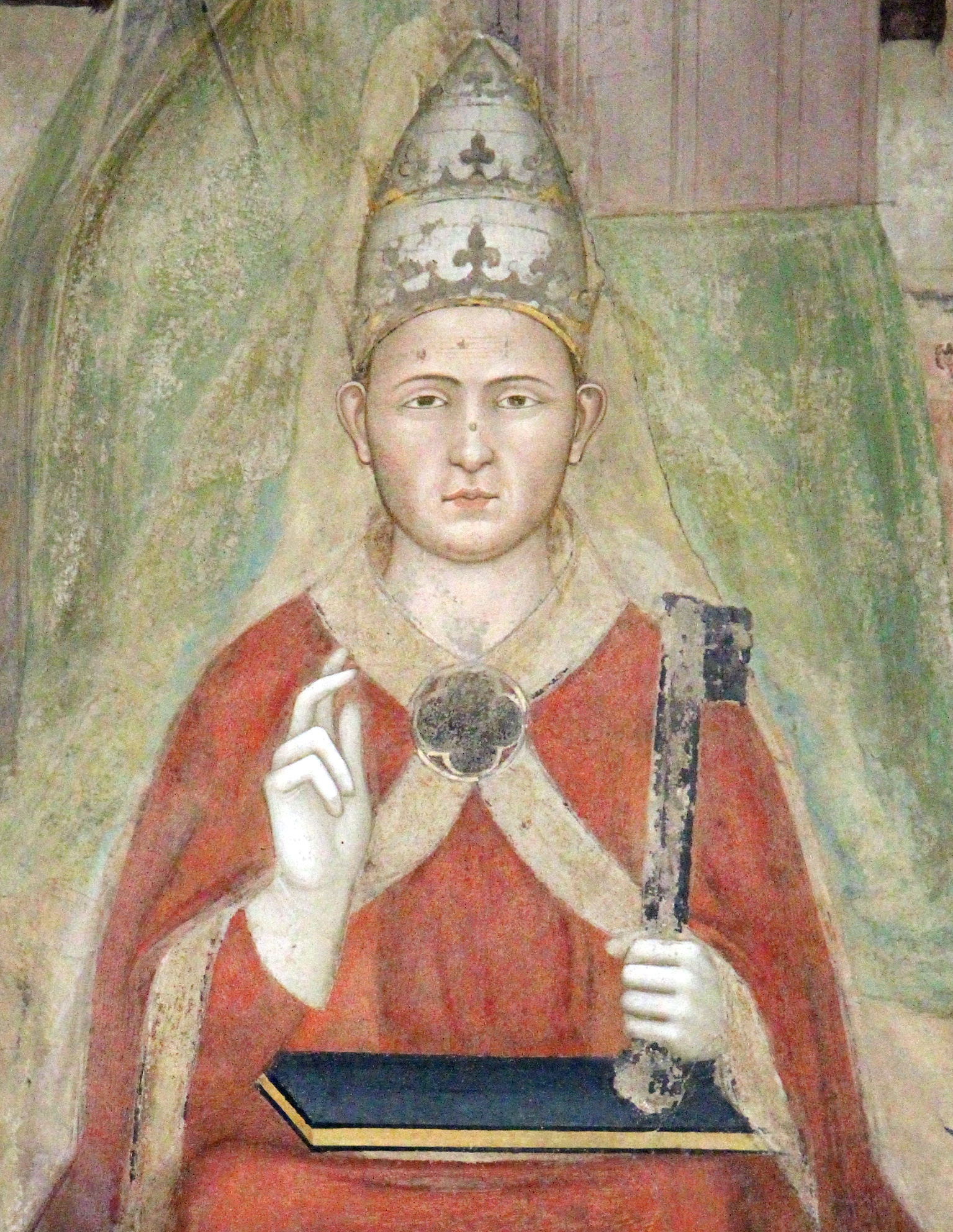
French Pope Clement V

- Pope Sylvester II (999–1003): Gerbert of Aurillac
- Pope Urban II (1088–1099): Otho of Lagery (or Otto or Odo)
- Pope Urban IV (1261–1264): Jacques Pantaléon
- Pope Clement IV (1265–1268): Guy Foulques
- Pope Martin IV (1281–1285): Simon de Brie
- Pope Clement V (1305–1314): Bertrand de Got ^{(A)}
- Pope John XXII (1316–1334): Jacques d'Euse ^{(A)}
- Pope Benedict XII (1334–1342): Jacques Fournier ^{(A)}
- Pope Clement VI (1342–1352): Pierre Roger ^{(A)}
- Pope Innocent VI (1352–1362): Stephen Aubert ^{(A)}
- Pope Urban V (1362–1370): Guillaume de Grimoard ^{(A)}
- Pope Gregory XI (1370–1378): Pierre Roger de Beaufort ^{(A)}

==== Holy Roman Empire ====
Pope Nicholas II and Pope Innocent V were from Savoy before it was annexed to France.

- Pope Leo IX (1049–1054) (Alsace, Duchy of Swabia): Bruno, Count of Dagsburg (sometimes referred to as German)
- Pope Stephen IX (1057–1058) (Duchy of Lorraine): Frederick of Lorraine (sometimes referred to as German)
- Pope Nicholas II (1059–1061) (Kingdom of Burgundy): Gerard of Burgundy
- Pope Callixtus II (1119–1124) (County of Burgundy): Guido of Vienne
- Pope Innocent V (1276) (Kingdom of Arles): Pierre de Tarentaise

==== Napoleonic France ====
Pope Leo XIII was born in Rome while it was under Napoleonic French occupation and is also listed under Italy.

- Pope Leo XIII (1878–1903)

=== Germany ===
There are up to nine popes who, for various reasons, have been historically referred to as "German" – including the Ostrogothic Boniface II, the Austrian Gregory V and the Dutch Adrian VI. However, only three of those were born within present-day Germany; the exact place of birth of Victor II is unknown.

- Pope Clement II (1046–1047) (Duchy of Saxony)
- Pope Damasus II (1048) (Duchy of Bavaria)
- Pope Victor II (1055–1057) (Duchy of Swabia)

=== England ===
England is part of the contemporary United Kingdom.

- Pope Adrian IV (1154–1159)

=== Portugal ===
- Pope John XXI (1276–1277) (Kingdom of Portugal)

=== Spain ===
The Kingdom of Valencia was then part of the possessions of the Crown of Aragon; it is now part of contemporary Spain.

- Pope Callixtus III (1455–1458)
- Pope Alexander VI (1492–1503)

=== Netherlands ===
Pope Adrian VI was from the Burgundian Netherlands within the Holy Roman Empire and was the last non-Italian elected pope until Pope John Paul II in 1978.

- Pope Adrian VI (1522–1523) (Bishopric of Utrecht)

== Popes since the creation of Vatican City ==
The Lateran Pacts of 1929 between the Kingdom of Italy under King Victor Emmanuel III and Benito Mussolini and the Holy See under Pope Pius XI settled the long-standing Roman question brought about by the unification of Italy. Italy agreed to recognize Vatican City as an independent state under the sovereignty of the Holy See. Italy also agreed to give the Catholic Church financial compensation for the loss of the Papal States. There have been nine popes since the legal creation of Vatican City in the 1929 Lateran Treaty: Pope Pius XI, Pope Pius XII, Pope John XXIII, Pope Paul VI, Pope John Paul I, Pope John Paul II, Pope Benedict XVI, Pope Francis, and the current Pope Leo XIV. All are naturalized citizens of Vatican City and are listed below in chronological order.

=== Italy ===
Since Pope Pius XI's 1929 Lateran Pacts, all his Italian papal successors were born citizens of the Kingdom of Italy; no Italian born since Italy became a republic in 1946 has been elected pope.

- Pope Pius XI (1922–1939) (Kingdom of Lombardy–Venetia)
- Pope Pius XII (1939–1958)
- Pope John XXIII (1958–1963)
- Pope Paul VI (1963–1978)
- Pope John Paul I (1978)

=== Poland ===
Pope John Paul II was the first non-Italian pope since Adrian VI in the 16th century and was born in the Second Polish Republic.

- Pope John Paul II (1978–2005)

=== Germany ===
Pope Benedict XVI was the second non-Italian pope since Adrian VI in the 16th century and was born in Weimar Germany.

- Pope Benedict XVI (2005–2013)

=== Argentina ===
Pope Francis was the first pope from the Americas, Latin America, South America, and the Southern Hemisphere, and the first born or raised outside Europe since the Syrian Pope Gregory III (731–741).

- Pope Francis (2013–2025)

=== United States and Peru ===
Pope Leo XIV is the first pope from North America and the second one from South America, Latin America, the Americas and the Southern Hemisphere. He was born in the United States and became a naturalized Peruvian citizen.

- Pope Leo XIV (2025–present)

== See also ==
- Annuario Pontificio
- Conclave
- History of the papacy
- Index of Vatican City-related articles
- Legends surrounding the papacy
- Liber Pontificalis
- Papal name
- Pope John numbering
- Prophecy of the Popes

=== Lists ===
- List of popes
- List of popes (graphical)
- List of canonized popes
- List of popes who died violently
- List of popes from the Borgia family
- List of popes from the Conti family
- List of popes from the Medici family
- List of sexually active popes

== Bibliography ==
- Saints and Sinners, a History of the Popes. Yale University Press. 1997. ISBN 0-300-07332-1.
- The Incredible Book of Vatican Facts and Papal Curiosities – a treasury of trivia, Gramercy Books, New York, 1998 ISBN 0-517-22083-0
