= 897 =

Calendar year

897 in various calendars
- Gregorian calendar: 897; DCCCXCVII
- Ab urbe condita: 1650
- Armenian calendar: 346; ԹՎ ՅԽԶ
- Assyrian calendar: 5647
- Balinese saka calendar: 818–819
- Bengali calendar: 303–304
- Berber calendar: 1847
- Buddhist calendar: 1441
- Burmese calendar: 259
- Byzantine calendar: 6405–6406
- Chinese calendar: 丙辰年 (Fire Dragon); 3594 or 3387 — to — 丁巳年 (Fire Snake); 3595 or 3388
- Coptic calendar: 613–614
- Discordian calendar: 2063
- Ethiopian calendar: 889–890
- Hebrew calendar: 4657–4658
- Hindu calendars
- Vikram Samvat: 953–954
- Shaka Samvat: 818–819
- Kali Yuga: 3997–3998
- Holocene calendar: 10897
- Iranian calendar: 275–276
- Islamic calendar: 283–284
- Japanese calendar: Kanpyō 9 (寛平９年)
- Javanese calendar: 795–796
- Julian calendar: 897; DCCCXCVII
- Korean calendar: 3230
- Minguo calendar: 1015 before ROC 民前1015年
- Nanakshahi calendar: −571
- Seleucid era: 1208/1209 AG
- Thai solar calendar: 1439–1440
- Tibetan calendar: མེ་ཕོ་འབྲུག་ལོ་ (male Fire-Dragon); 1023 or 642 or −130 — to — མེ་མོ་སྦྲུལ་ལོ་ (female Fire-Snake); 1024 or 643 or −129

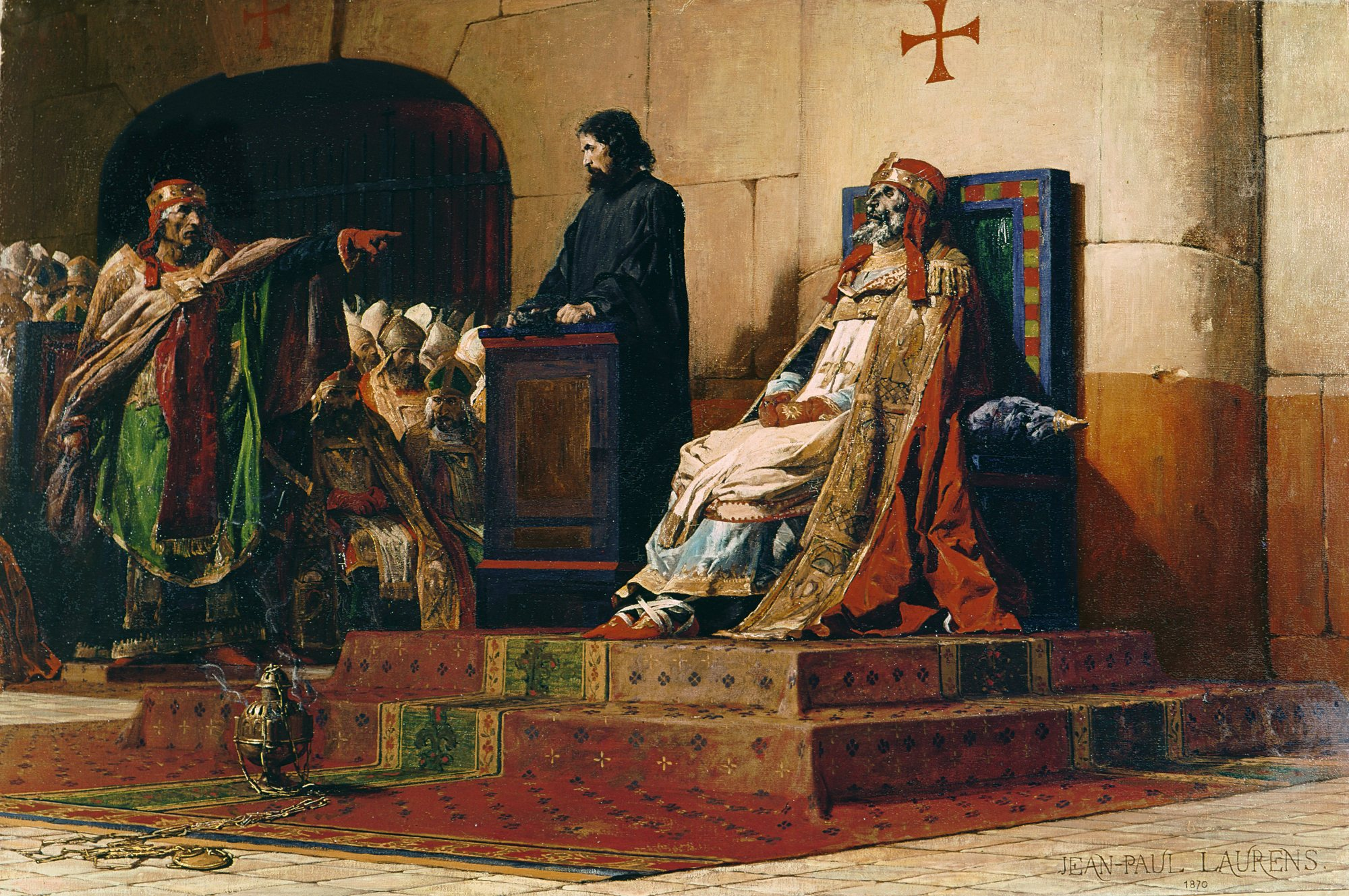
The cadaver of Pope Formosus is put on trial at St. Peter's.

Year 897 (DCCCXCVII) was a common year starting on Saturday of the Julian calendar.

== Events ==
=== By place ===
==== Europe ====
- Spring – King Lambert II travels to Rome with his mother, Queen Ageltrude and brother Guy IV, Lombard duke of Spoleto, to meet Pope Stephen VI to receive reconfirmation of his imperial title. Guy is murdered on the Tiber by agents of Alberic I, a Frankish nobleman with political interests. He seizes Spoleto (possibly at the instigation of King Berengar I) and sets himself up as duke.

==== Britain ====
- English warships (nine vessels from Alfred's new fleet) intercept six Viking longships in the mouth of an unknown estuary on the south coast (possibly at Poole Harbour) in Dorset. The Danes are blockaded, and three ships attempt to break through the English lines. Lashing the Viking boats to their own, the English crew board the enemy's vessels and kill everyone on board. Some ships manage to escape, two of the other three boats are driven against the Sussex coast. The shipwrecked sailors are brought before King Alfred the Great at Winchester and hanged. Just one Viking ship returns to East Anglia.

==== Arabian Empire ====
- Caliph al-Mu'tadid recovers control of the Cilician Thughur (southeastern Anatolia) and of northern Syria, during the turmoil in the Tulunid government (approximate date).
- 15 March – Al-Hadi ila'l-Haqq Yahya enters Saada and founds the Zaydi Imamate of Yemen.

==== Japan ====
- Emperor Uda abdicates the throne after a ten year reign. He is succeeded by his 12-year-old son Daigo, as the 60th emperor of Japan.

=== By topic ===
==== Religion ====
- January – The Cadaver Synod: Lambert II orders Stephen VI to exhume the nine-month-old cadaver of former pope Formosus, to redress him in papal robes, and have him put on trial while seated in a chair at St. Peter's. Formosus is 'convicted' of several crimes, his fingers of consecration are cut off, and the body is stripped of his vestments.
- August – Stephen VI is removed from office, imprisoned and strangled in his cell. He is succeeded by Romanus as the 114th pope of the Catholic Church.
- December – Romanus is deposed and succeeded by Theodore II as the 115th pope of Rome, who dies twenty days later.

== Births ==
- Abu al-Faraj al-Isfahani, Arab historian (d. 967)
- Gyeongsun, king of Silla (Korea) (d. 978)
- Balderic, bishop of Utrecht (d. 975)
- Yang Longyan, king of Wu (d. 920)

== Deaths ==
- November 16 – Gu Yanhui, Chinese warlord
- Ali ibn Ahmad al-Madhara'i, Muslim vizier
- Buhturi, Muslim poet (b. 820)
- Ermengard of Italy, queen and regent of Provence
- Fujiwara no Sukeyo, Japanese aristocrat (b. 847)
- Guy IV, duke of Spoleto
- Heahstan, bishop of London
- Jinseong, queen of Silla (Korea)
- Li Zi ('Prince of Tong'), prince of the Tang Dynasty
- Mashdotz I, Armenian monk and catholicos (or 898)
- Minamoto no Yoshiari, Japanese official (b. 845)
- Stephen VI, pope of the Catholic Church
- Theodore II, pope of the Catholic Church (b. 840)
- Wilfred the Hairy, Frankish nobleman
- Ya'qubi, Muslim geographer (or 898)
- Zhaozhou, Chinese Zen Buddhist master (b. 778)
- Zhu Xuan, Chinese warlord and governor (jiedushi)
