= 898 =

Calendar year

898 in various calendars
- Gregorian calendar: 898; DCCCXCVIII
- Ab urbe condita: 1651
- Armenian calendar: 347; ԹՎ ՅԽԷ
- Assyrian calendar: 5648
- Balinese saka calendar: 819–820
- Bengali calendar: 304–305
- Berber calendar: 1848
- Buddhist calendar: 1442
- Burmese calendar: 260
- Byzantine calendar: 6406–6407
- Chinese calendar: 丁巳年 (Fire Snake); 3595 or 3388 — to — 戊午年 (Earth Horse); 3596 or 3389
- Coptic calendar: 614–615
- Discordian calendar: 2064
- Ethiopian calendar: 890–891
- Hebrew calendar: 4658–4659
- Hindu calendars
- Vikram Samvat: 954–955
- Shaka Samvat: 819–820
- Kali Yuga: 3998–3999
- Holocene calendar: 10898
- Iranian calendar: 276–277
- Islamic calendar: 284–285
- Japanese calendar: Kanpyō 10 / Shōtai 1 (昌泰元年)
- Javanese calendar: 796–797
- Julian calendar: 898; DCCCXCVIII
- Korean calendar: 3231
- Minguo calendar: 1014 before ROC 民前1014年
- Nanakshahi calendar: −570
- Seleucid era: 1209/1210 AG
- Thai solar calendar: 1440–1441
- Tibetan calendar: མེ་མོ་སྦྲུལ་ལོ་ (female Fire-Snake); 1024 or 643 or −129 — to — ས་ཕོ་རྟ་ལོ་ (male Earth-Horse); 1025 or 644 or −128

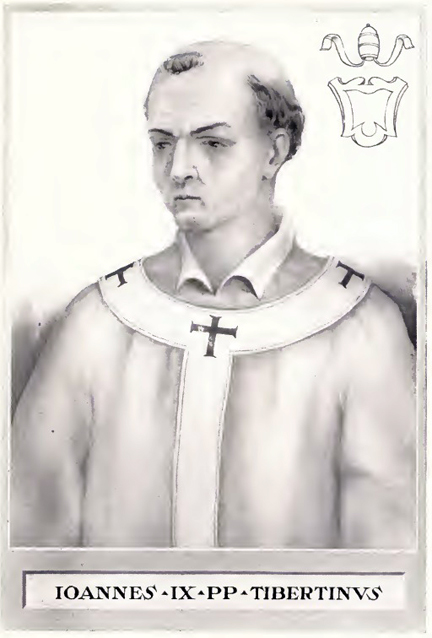
Pope John IX (898–900)

Year 898 (DCCCXCVIII) was a common year starting on Sunday of the Julian calendar.

== Events ==
=== By place ===
==== Europe ====
- January 1 – King Odo I (or Eudes) dies at La Fère (Northern France) after a 10-year reign. His rival, the 18-year-old Charles the Simple in Laon, gains sovereignty and becomes ruler (with no real authority) of the West Frankish Kingdom. This puts an end to five years of civil war between the Frankish nobles.
- Summer – Adalbert II, margrave of Tuscany, revolts (pushed by his wife Bertha) against his cousin, Emperor Lambert II. The Tuscan army proceeds against the Lombard capital of Pavia. Lambert with his forces at Marengo defeats Adalbert at Borgo San Donnino, taking him, as a prisoner, to Pavia.
- October 15 – Lambert II dies from falling off his horse while hunting — or is killed (possibly assassinated by supporters of Maginulf of Milan). After the death of Lambert, his rival Berengar I gains recognition as king of Italy. He releases Adalbert II and receives homage from the Italian nobles.

==== Britain ====
- King Alfred the Great makes his eldest son Edward the Elder co-ruler of Wessex in preparation for his accession to the English throne.

=== By topic ===
==== Religion ====
- January – Pope John IX is consecrated, and succeeds Theodore II, as the 116th pope of the Catholic Church. His rival Serguis III (a Spoletan ally of Lambert II) is excommunicated, and takes refuge at the court of Adalbert II.
- John IX holds councils at Rome and Ravenna to rehabilitate the late Pope Formosus. He condemns the Cadaver Synod of the late Pope Stephen VI, and restores the clergymen who were deposed by Stephen's faction.

== Births ==
- Fu Yanqing, Chinese general (d. 975)
- He Ning, Chinese chancellor (d. 955)
- Hugh the Great, Father of Hugh Capet and progenitor of the Capetian Kings (approximate date) (d. 956)
- Li Congyan, Chinese general (d. 946)
- Sang Weihan, Chinese chief of staff (d. 947)
- Ngô Quyền, Vietnamese warlord who later became the founder of the Ngô Dynasty (d. 944)

== Deaths ==
- January 1 – Odo I, king of the West Frankish Kingdom
- October 15 – Lambert II, king of Italy and Holy Roman Emperor
- Adalbold I, bishop of Utrecht (approximate date)
- Ahmad ibn Isa al-Shaybani, Muslim leader
- Aitíth mac Laigni, king of Ulaid (Ireland)
- Al-Mubarrad, Muslim grammarian (b. 826)
- Athanasius, bishop and duke of Naples
- Doseon, Korean Buddhist monk (b. 826)
- Gagik Apumrvan Artsruni, Armenian prince
- Hsiang-yen Chih-hsien, Chinese Ch'an master
- Luo Hongxin, Chinese warlord (b. 836)
- Mashdotz I, Armenian monk and catholicos (or 897)
- Stephen, duke of Amalfi (approximate date)
- Wang Chao, Chinese warlord (b. 846)
- Ya'qubi, Muslim geographer (or 897)
