= Pope Romanus =

Head of the Catholic Church in 897

- Bishop of Rome
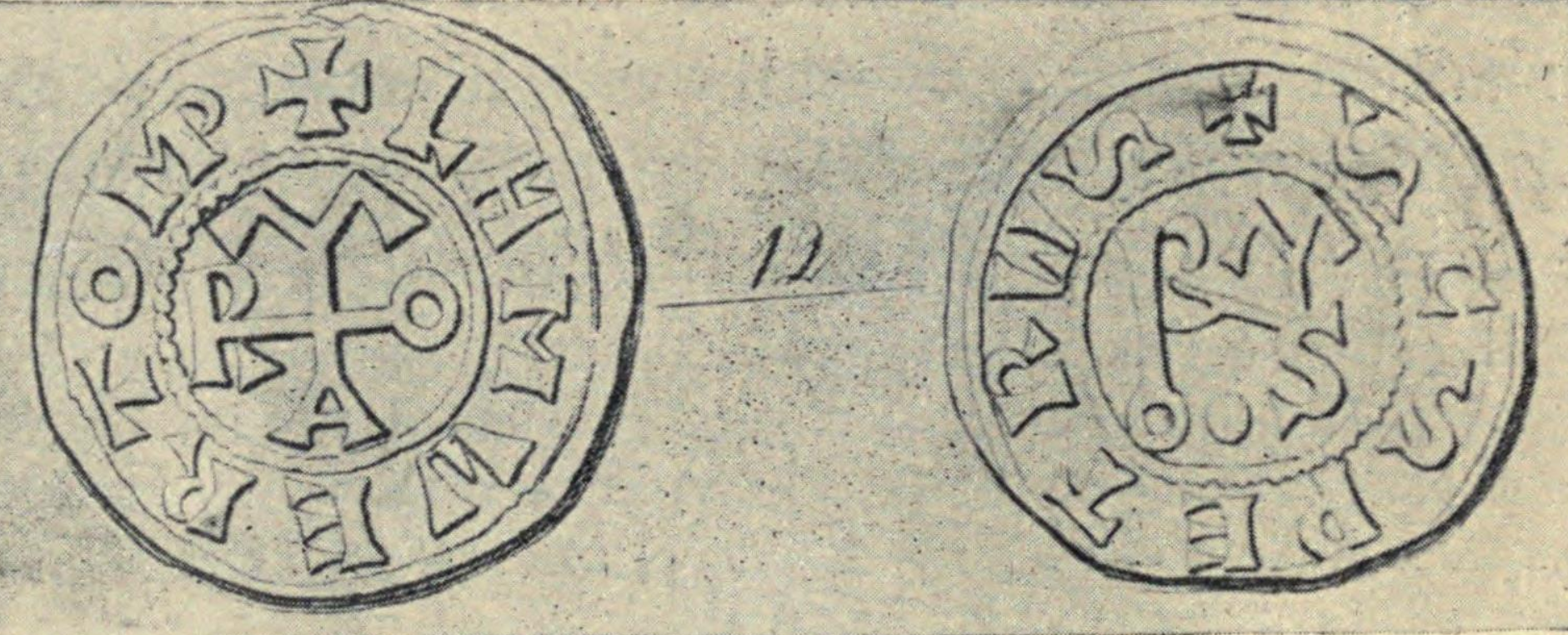
- Coin of Romanus
- Church: Catholic Church
- Papacy began: August 897
- Papacy ended: November 897
- Predecessor: Stephen VI
- Successor: Theodore II

Personal details
- Born: Gallese, Papal States

Pope Romanus (fl. 867–897) was the bishop of Rome and ruler of the Papal States from August to November 897. His short reign occurred during a period of partisan strife in the Catholic Church, amid the violence and disorder in central Italy. His pontificate ended when he was deposed and confined to a monastery.

== Family and early career ==
Little is known of Romanus's background. He was born in Gallese, near Civita Castellana. His father was called Constantine. According to Anura Gurugé, Romanus was supposedly the nephew of Pope Marinus I, who had also come from Gallese. Romanus was installed as the cardinal priest of San Pietro in Vincoli, in Rome, in 867.

== Papacy ==
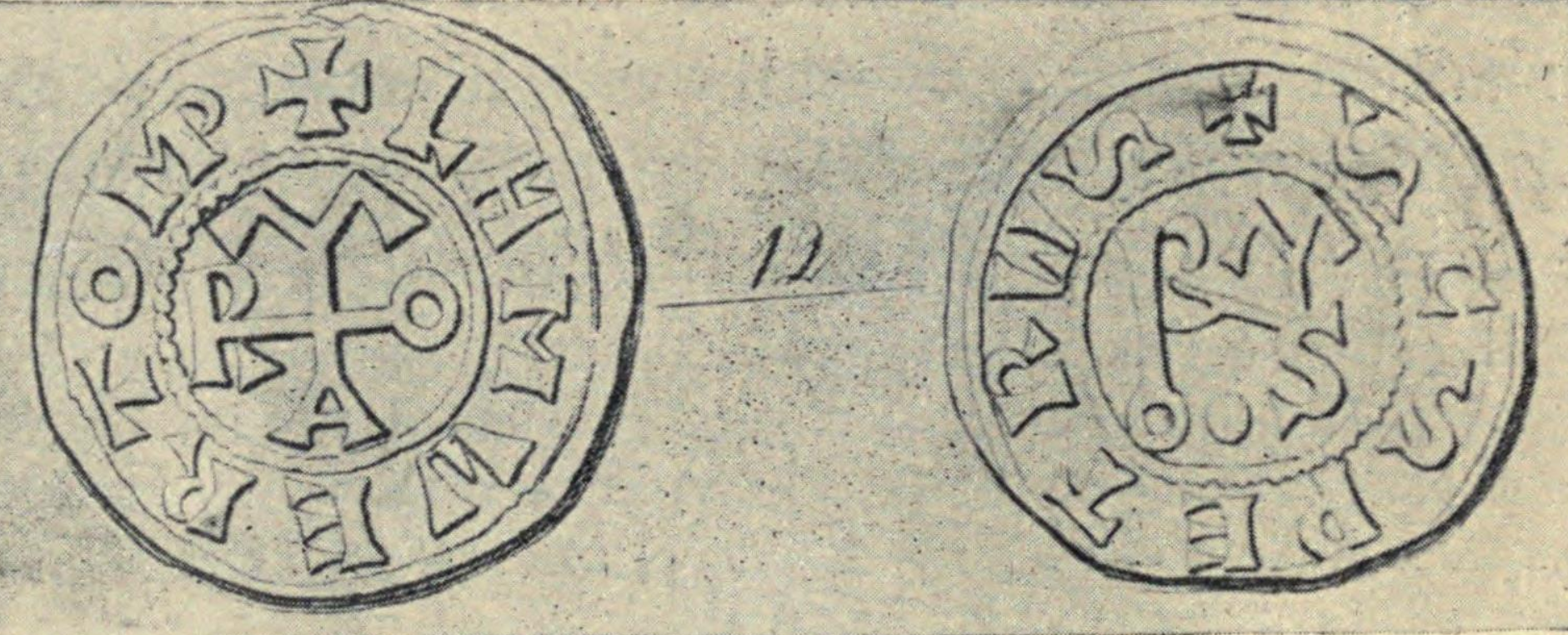
Coin of Pope Romanus, bearing the name of Lambert on the obverse, and "Scs. Petrus" and his monogram on the reverse

In January 897, Pope Stephen VI held what is known as the Cadaver Synod. He had the body of Pope Formosus, the rival of his ally, Lambert of Spoleto, exhumed and tried for "perjury, violating the canons prohibiting the translation of bishops, and coveting the papacy." After finding him guilty, the synod annulled all of Formosus' acts and ordinations. Formosus' body was reburied in a common grave, and then thrown in the river Tiber. Supporters of Formosus rebelled, and seven months after the synod, Stephen VI was deposed, and died soon after in prison.

Romanus was elected to succeed Stephen VI in August 897. He was generally considered to be pro-Formosan, and annulled all the acts and decrees of his predecessor. This was criticised by the 15th-century historian Bartolomeo Platina, who wrote that "these popelings studied nothing else but to extinguish the memory and honour of their predecessors". During his short pontificate, he granted the pallium to Abbot Vitalis of Farfa, appointed him as the patriarch of Grado, and bestowed a privilege upon the See of Grado. Romanus also confirmed the possessions of the bishops of Girona and Elna of their sees. His short rule was regarded as a virtuous one by contemporary historian Flodoard.

== Death and aftermath ==
Romanus' reign as pope ended in November 897, when it is said that "he was made a monk", a term used when a pope is deposed and often confined to a monastery. It is unknown whether he was deposed by supporters of his predecessor, Stephen VI, or by pro-Formosan supporters, who wanted to replace him with a pope who would more actively vindicate Formosus. Romanus' date of death is unknown.

The power struggle between supporters of Formosus and those of Stephen continued for over ten years; Romanus was succeeded by Theodore II, who was only pope for twenty days, during which time he had Formosus' body reburied, and held a synod annulling the Cadaver Synod. This was reaffirmed by John IX who held synods reaffirming that of Theodore II, and he further banned the trial of people after their death. In turn, Sergius III later annulled the synods of Theodore II and John IX, and reinstated the validity of the Cadaver Synod.

== Bibliography ==
- Dollison, John (1994). Pope-Pourri: What You Don't Remember From Catholic School. New York: Fireside. ISBN 978-0-671-88615-8.
- Gurugé, Anura (2010). The Next Pope. Alton, New Hampshire: WOWNH LLC. ISBN 978-0-615-35372-2.
- Kelly, J. N. D.; Walsh, M. J. (2010) [1986]. Oxford Dictionary of Popes. Oxford University Press. ISBN 978-0-19-929581-4.
- Mann, Horace Kinder (1912). "Pope Romanus" . In Herbermann, Charles (ed.). Catholic Encyclopedia. Vol. 13. New York: Robert Appleton Company.
- Platina, Bartolomeo (1479). The Lives of the Popes From The Time Of Our Saviour Jesus Christ to the Accession of Gregory VII. Vol. I. London: Griffith Farran & Co.

Catholic Church titles
Preceded by Stephen VI	Pope; 897	Succeeded by Theodore II
