= The Bad Popes =

1969 book by E. R. Chamberlin

- Author: E. R. Chamberlin
- Language: English
- Genre: History
- Publisher: Dial Press
- Publication date: 1969; 57 years ago
- Media type: Print
- Pages: 310
- ISBN: 0-880-29116-8

The Bad Popes is a 1969 book by E. R. Chamberlin documenting the lives of eight of the most controversial popes (papal years in parentheses):

- Pope Stephen VI (896–897), who exhumed and tried his dead predecessor Pope Formosus.
- Pope John XII (955–964), who murdered several people.
- Pope Benedict IX (1032–1044, 1045, 1047–1048), who was accused of selling the Papacy.
- Pope Boniface VIII (1294–1303), who regularly interfered in the politics of neighboring kingdoms.
- Pope Urban VI (1378–1389), who tortured cardinals who had conspired against him.
- Pope Alexander VI (1492–1503), who, besides being openly promiscuous, was found guilty of nepotism.
- Pope Leo X (1513–1521), who once spent 1/7 of the Papal reserves on a single ceremony, leading Martin Luther to publish the 95 Theses and spark the Protestant Reformation.
- Pope Clement VII (1523–1534), whose power-politicking led to the Sack of Rome.

== Reviews ==
- Milligan, Sam (August 24, 1969). "'Bad Popes' and Era Examined by Writer". Fort Worth Star-Telegram – via newspapers.com.
- Rogers, W. G. (August 31, 1969). "Consumed by Greed, the Princes Wage War and Shear the Sheep". The Grand Rapids Press – via newspapers.com.
- Cargill Thompson, James (August 31, 1969). "People get the popes they deserve". Chicago Tribune – via newspapers.com.
- Cox, Bud (September 1, 1969). "Popes of Another Day". The Charlotte News – via newspapers.com.
- Johnson, Norman (September 7, 1969). "Seven Popes Linked by Church Crises". The Courier-Journal – via newspapers.com.
- Kirsch, Robert (September 19, 1969). "Balanced, Detached View of the Seven 'Bad' Popes". The Los Angeles Times – via newspapers.com.
- Hoyt, William D. (September 23, 1969). "Incredible years of 3 rival popes". The Boston Globe – via newspapers.com.
- Goedhart, Bernie (October 17, 1969). "Papal fallibility with a vengeance". Edmonton Journal – via newspapers.com.
- O'Brien, John A. (November 2, 1969). "(Books)". The South Bend Tribune – via newspapers.com.
- Tucker, William J. Jr. (November 4, 1969). "(Books)". St. Louis Post-Dispatch – via newspapers.com.
- Di Camillo, Kevin (November 26, 2019). "How Bad Were 'the Bad Popes?'". National Catholic Register.
- "The bad popes". Kirkus Reviews. June 1, 1969.
- Kronenberger, Louis (July 1969). "The Bad Popes". The Atlantic.
