= American pope =

American pope may refer to:

== People ==
- Pope Francis (2013–2025), born in Argentina
- Pope Leo XIV (2025–present), born in the United States; also naturalized Peruvian

== Other uses ==
- The American Pope, book by John Cooney about Francis Spellman
- "Un papa americano", a parody version by Spanish comedian José Mota of the song "We No Speak Americano" by Yolanda Be Cool

== See also ==
- List of popes by country
