= Ageltrude =

Holy Roman Empress from 891 to 894

Queen consort of Italy
- Tenure: 889 – 12 December 894

Holy Roman Empress
- Tenure: 891 – 12 December 894
- Born: c. 860
- Died: 27 August 923
- Spouse: Guy III of Spoleto
- Issue: Lambert of Italy
- Father: Adelchis of Benevento
- Mother: Adeltrude

Ageltrude or Agiltrude (around 860 – 27 August 923) was the Empress and Queen of Italy as the wife of Guy (reigned 891–894). She was the regent for her son Lambert (reigned 894–898) and actively encouraged him in opposing the Carolingians, and in influencing papal elections in their favour.

== Life ==
Ageltrude was the daughter of Prince Adelchis of Benevento and Adeltrude. She married Guy of Spoleto circa 875, when he was the duke and margrave of Spoleto and Camerino. Guy of Spoleto defeated Berengar to became King of Italy in 889, and then, in 891, he was crowned Holy Roman Emperor, making Ageltrude empress. Guy's reign was short, and in 894, Guy died, leaving Ageltrude a widow. As their son, Lambert, was a minor, she became regent.

In 894, Ageltrude accompanied her 14-year-old son, Lambert, to Rome to be confirmed as emperor by Pope Formosus, who supported the Carolingian claimant Arnulf of Carinthia. In 896, she and her son fled from Rome to Spoleto when Arnulf marched into Rome and was crowned in opposition to Lambert. This loss was only temporary, however, as Pope Formosus died a mere month after crowning Arnulf, and Arnulf himself was soon paralysed by a stroke.

Ageltrude, in a position of such power, took the opportunity to assert her authority in Rome and, after the very brief two-week papal reign of Boniface VI, she worked to have her preferred candidate elected as Pope Stephen VI. At her and Lambert's request, the body of Pope Formosus was disinterred, given a full trial on accusations of transferring one see to another, convicted, and his corpse was hurled into the Tiber, in an event that came to be known as the Cadaver Synod. Lambert became Lambert II of Spoleto.

In 898, her son died. She retired from politics after the death of her son and settled in the convent of Camerino and later in the convent of Salsomaggiore.

| Preceded by Richardis | Empress of the Holy Roman Empire; 891–894 | Succeeded by Ota |
| Preceded by Bertila of Spoleto | Queen consort of Italy; 889–894 | Succeeded by Ota |
