= Pope Evaristus =

Head of the Catholic Church from c. 99 to c. 107

Pope Saint Evaristus
- Bishop of Rome
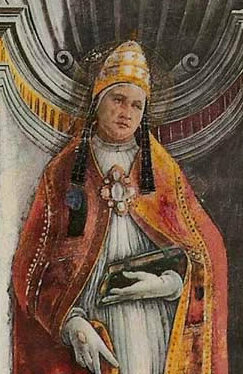
- 15th century depiction by Sandro Botticelli, Sistine Chapel
- Church: Early Church
- Papacy began: c. 100
- Papacy ended: c. 108
- Predecessor: Clement I
- Successor: Alexander I

Personal details
- Born: Bethlehem, Judaea, Roman Empire
- Died: c. 108 Rome, Italy, Roman Empire
- Parents: Judah

Sainthood
- Feast day: 26 October

Pope Evaristus (Ancient Greek: Εὐάριστος) was the bishop of Rome from c. 99/100 to his death in 107/108. He was also known as Aristus and is venerated as a saint in the Catholic Church, Eastern Orthodox Church, and Oriental Orthodoxy. It is likely that John the Apostle died during his reign period, marking the end of the Apostolic Age.

== Biography ==
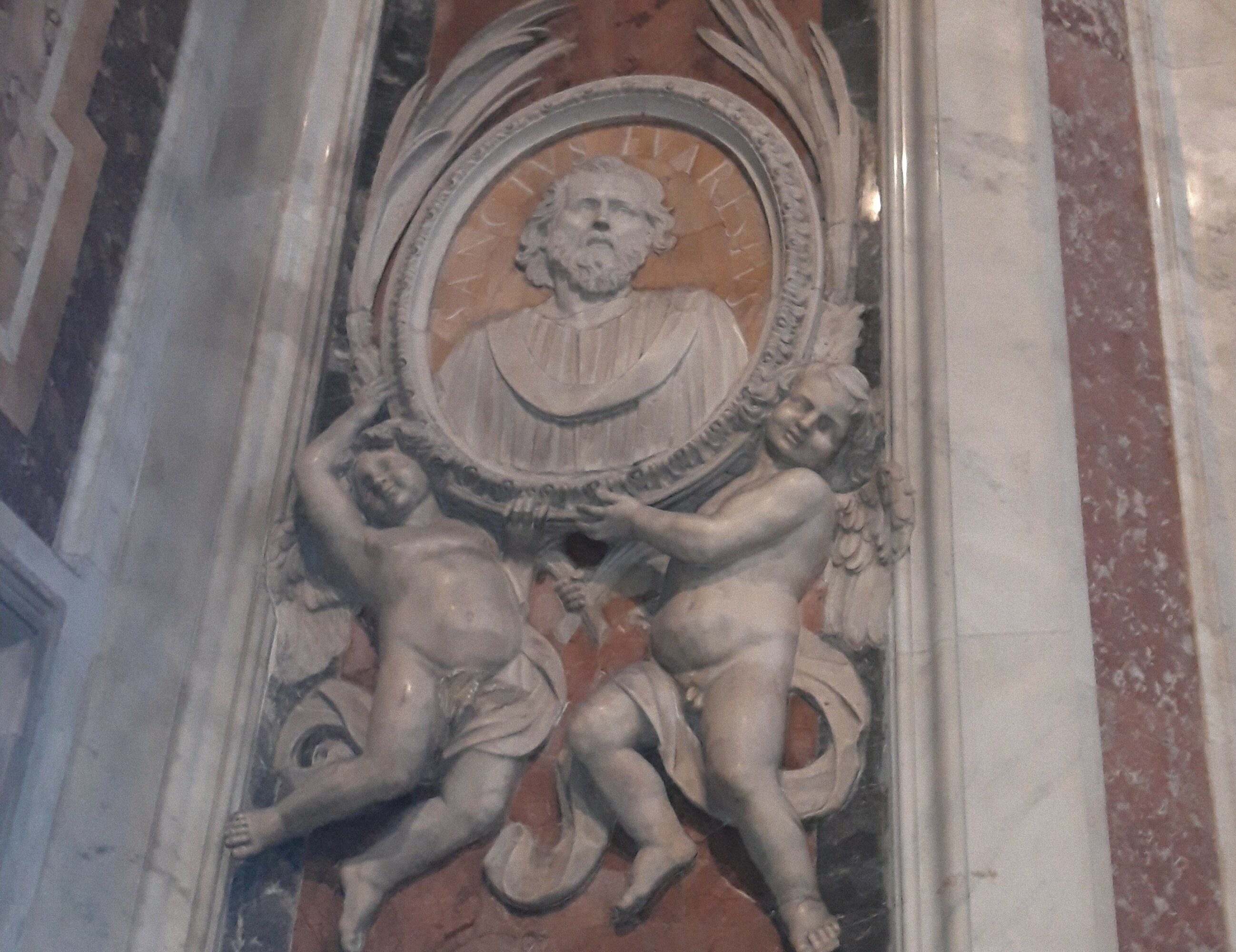
Evaristus I depicted in marble in Saint Peter's Basilica

According to the Liber Pontificalis, he was a Greek by birth, fathered by a Greek Jew named Judah from the city of Bethlehem. Eusebius, in his Ecclesiastical History, states that Evaristus took office in the 3rd year of Trajan's reign, which corresponds to AD 99/100, and died in the 12th year of the same reign (AD 108/109) after holding the office for nine years. He divided titles among the priests in the city of Rome, and ordained seven deacons to assist with the bishop's preaching.

According to the Rev. John F. Sullivan, Evaristus decreed that "in accordance with Apostolic tradition marriage should be celebrated publicly and with the blessing of the priest". Liber Pontificalis further describes him as the one "crowned with martyrdom". The same is indicated also by French historian Alexis-François Artaud de Montor. However, in the Roman Martyrology he is listed without the martyr title, with a feast day on 26 October.

Pope Evaristus is buried near the body of Saint Peter in the Vatican, in Saint Peter's tomb under Saint Peter's Basilica.

== See also ==
- List of Catholic saints
- List of popes

Catholic Church titles
Preceded by Clement I	Bishop of Rome; Pope; 98–105	Succeeded by Alexander I
