= Pope Boniface =

There have been eight popes and one antipope named Boniface.

- Pope Boniface I (saint; 418–422)
- Pope Boniface II (530–532)
- Pope Boniface III (607)
- Pope Boniface IV (saint; 608–615)
- Pope Boniface V (619–625)
- Pope Boniface VI (896)
  - Antipope Boniface VII (984–985) (now listed as an antipope)
- Pope Boniface VIII (1294–1303)
- Pope Boniface IX (1389–1404)
