= Pope Benedict IV =

Head of the Catholic Church from 900 to 903

- Bishop of Rome
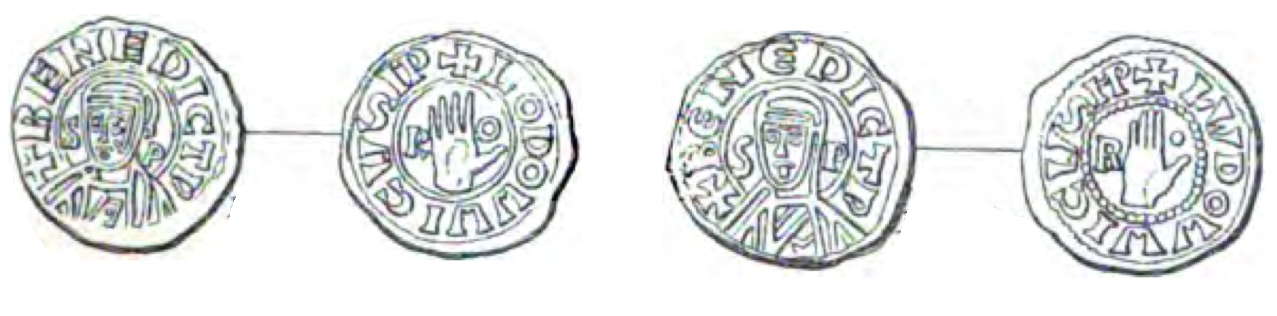
- Coins of Pope Benedict IV and Louis the Blind
- Church: Catholic Church
- Papacy began: 1 February 900
- Papacy ended: July 903
- Predecessor: John IX
- Successor: Leo V

Personal details
- Born: c. 840 Rome, Papal States
- Died: 30 July 903 Rome, Papal States

Pope Benedict IV (Latin: Benedictus IV; c. 840 – 30 July 903) was the bishop of Rome and ruler of the Papal States from 1 February 900 to his death in July 903. The tenth-century historian Flodoard, who nicknamed him "the Great", commended his noble birth and public generosity.

Benedict was a native of Rome, the son of one Mammalus, and was ordained priest by Pope Formosus. He succeeded Pope John IX. In 900, he excommunicated Count Baldwin II of Flanders for murdering Archbishop Fulk of Reims. In 901, Benedict crowned Louis the Blind as emperor. In 902, Berengar of Friuli defeated Louis III and forced him to leave Italy. Benedict died in Rome during the summer of 903; it is possible that Berengar had some involvement. Benedict was buried in front of St Peter's Basilica, by the gate of Guido. He was followed by Pope Leo V.

== Literature ==
- Bertolini, Ottorino (1966). "Benedetto IV, papa". Dizionario Biografico degli Italiani (in Italian). Vol. 8: Bellucci–Beregan. Rome: Istituto dell'Enciclopedia Italiana. pp. 27–31. ISBN 978-88-12-00032-6.
- Ottorino Bertolini: Benedetto IV. In: Massimo Bray (ed.): Enciclopedia dei Papi. Volume 2: Niccolò I, santo, Sisto IV. Istituto della Enciclopedia Italiana, Rome 2000, pp. 54–58 (treccani.it)
- Rudolf Schieffer (1980). "Benedikt IV". Lexikon des Mittelalters, I: Aachen bis Bettelordenskirchen (in German). Stuttgart and Weimar: J. B. Metzler. col. 1858. ISBN 3-7608-8901-8.

Catholic Church titles
Preceded by John IX	Pope; 900–903	Succeeded by Leo V
