= Pope Theodore II =

Head of the Catholic Church in 897

- Bishop of Rome
- Church: Catholic Church
- Papacy began: December 897
- Papacy ended: December 897
- Predecessor: Romanus
- Successor: John IX

Personal details
- Born: 840 Rome, Papal States
- Died: December 897 (aged 56–57) Rome, Papal States

Pope Theodore II (Latin: Theodorus II; 840 – December 897) was the bishop of Rome and ruler of the Papal States for twenty days in December 897. His short reign occurred during a period of partisan strife in the Catholic Church, which was entangled with a period of violence and disorder in central Italy. His main act as pope was to annul the recent Cadaver Synod, therefore reinstating the acts and ordinations of Pope Formosus, which had themselves been annulled by Pope Stephen VI. He also had the body of Formosus recovered from the river Tiber and reburied with honour. He died in office in late December 897.

== Background ==
Little is known of Theodore's background; he is recorded as being born a Roman, and the son of Photios. His brother Theodosius (or Theosius) was also a bishop. Theodore was ordained as a priest by Pope Stephen V.

In January 897, Pope Stephen VI held what is known as the Cadaver Synod. Because his predecessor, Formosus, sided with Arnulf of Carinthia rather than Stephen's ally, Lambert of Spoleto, in their struggle for the imperial dignity, Stephen had the corpse of Formosus exhumed and tried for "perjury, violating the canons prohibiting the translation of bishops, and coveting the papacy". The dead pope was found guilty, his body thrown in the Tiber, and all his acts and ordinations were annulled. Supporters of Formosus rebelled and deposed Stephen VI. His successor, Romanus, is generally assumed to have been pro-Formosus, but he too was soon deposed.

== Papacy ==
Theodore II was elected to succeed the deposed Romanus as pope. The exact dates of Theodore II's pontificate are unknown, but modern sources generally agree that he was pope for twenty days during December 897. Flodoard, a tenth-century French chronicler, only credited Theodore with a twelve-day reign, while in his history of the popes, Alexis-François Artaud de Montor listed Theodore's reign as being twenty days, from 12 February to 3 March 898.

Like Romanus, Theodore was a supporter of Formosus. Some historians believe that Romanus had been deposed because he had not acted to restore Formosus' honour quickly enough, though others suggest that he was removed by supporters of Stephen VI. In either case, Theodore immediately threw himself into the task of undoing the Cadaver Synod. He called his own synod, which annulled the rulings set out by Stephen VI. In so doing, he restored the acts and ordinations of Formosus, including the restoration of a large number of clergy and bishops to their offices. Theodore also ordered Formosus' body to be recovered from the harbour of Portus, where it had been secretly buried, and restored to the original grave at Old St. Peter's Basilica. Like Romanus before him, Theodore bestowed a privilege upon the See of Grado, and had a coin minted, bearing the name of Lambert on the obverse, and "Scs. Petrus" and "Thedr." on the reverse.

Flodoard cast Theodore in a positive light, describing him as "beloved of the clergy, a friend of peace, temperate, chaste, affable and a great lover of the poor." He died in office, though the cause of his death is unknown. Because of this, some writers, such as Wendy Reardon, suggest the possibility of foul play. Horace Kinder Mann offers a different suggestion in his papal history, noting that it is possible that popes who were "infirm or even older than [...] their predecessors" might have been elected intentionally. Theodore was buried at St. Peter's Basilica, but his tomb was destroyed during the demolition of the old basilica in the seventeenth century.

== Aftermath ==
After Theodore's death, both John IX and Sergius III claimed to have been elected pope; the latter was excommunicated and driven from the city, though he did later become pope in 904. John IX held synods reaffirming that of Theodore II, and he further banned the trial of people after their death. In turn, Sergius III later annulled the synods of Theodore II and John IX, and reinstated the validity of the Cadaver Synod.

== Bibliography ==
- Artaud De Montor, Alexis-François (1911). The Lives and Times of the Popes. New York: The Catholic Publication Society of America. OCLC 388047.
- Dollison, John (1994). Pope-Pourri: What You Don't Remember From Catholic School. New York: Fireside. ISBN 978-0-671-88615-8.
- Gregorovius, Ferdinand (2010) [1895]. History of the City of Rome in the Middle Ages. New York: Cambridge University Press. ISBN 978-1-108-01502-8.
- Kelly, J. N. D.; Walsh, M. J. (2010) [1986]. Oxford Dictionary of Popes. Oxford University Press. ISBN 978-0-19-929581-4.
- Mann, Horace K. (1910). The Lives of the Popes in the Early Middle Ages. London: Kegan Paul, Trench, Truebner, & Co. Ltd. OCLC 499626370.
- Reardon, Wendy J. (2004). The Deaths of the Popes. Jefferson, North Carolina: McFarland & Co. ISBN 978-0-7864-6116-5.
- Mann, Horace Kinder (1912). "Pope Theodore II" . In Herbermann, Charles (ed.). Catholic Encyclopedia. Vol. 14. New York: Robert Appleton Company.

Catholic Church titles
Preceded by Romanus	Pope; 897	Succeeded by John IX
