= Gallese =

- Comune
- Comune di Gallese
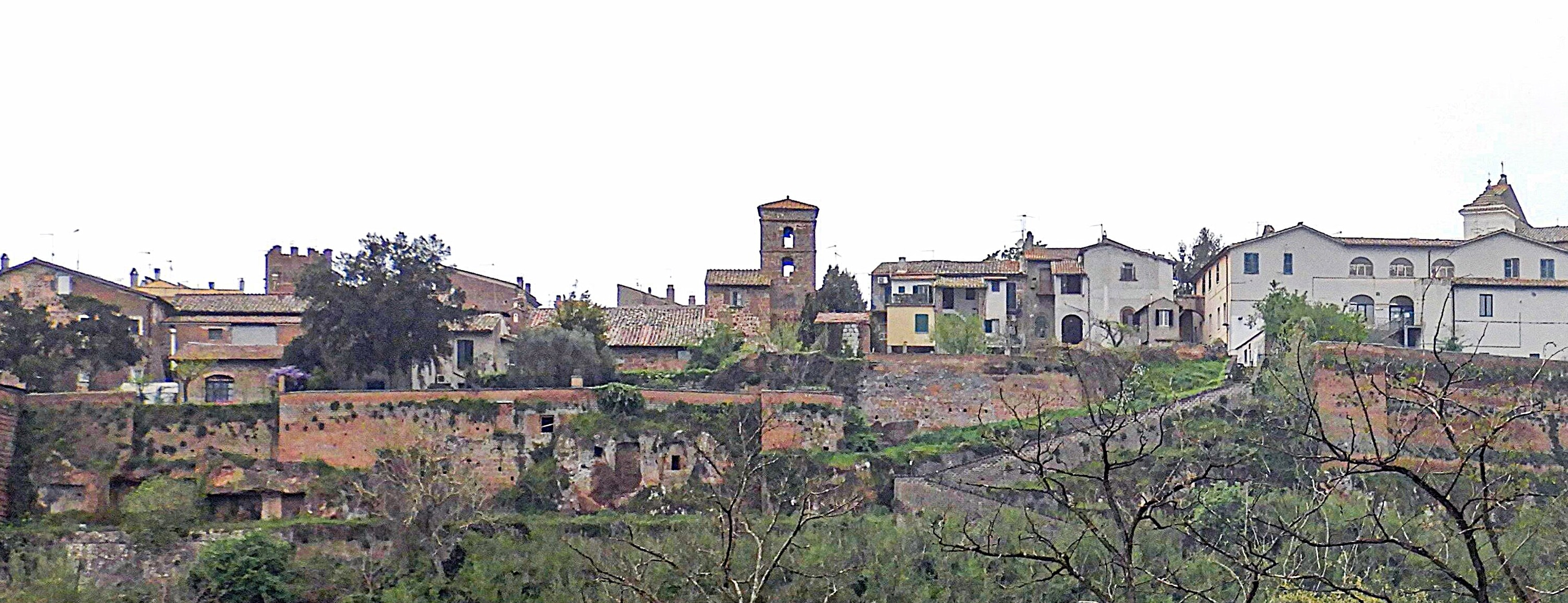
- View of Gallese

- Coat of arms

- Location within Italy Location within Lazio
- Coordinates: 42°22′28″N 12°23′59″E
- Country: Italy
- Region: Lazio
- Province: Viterbo (VT)

Government
  - Mayor: Danilo Piersanti

Area
  - Total: 37.17 km^{2} (14.35 sq mi)
- Elevation: 135 m (443 ft)

Population (31 December 2017)
  - Total: 2,821
  - Density: 75.89/km^{2} (196.6/sq mi)
- Time zone: UTC+1 (CET)
  - Summer (DST): UTC+2 (CEST)
- Postal code: 01035
- Dialing code: 0761
- Patron saint: San Famiano
- Saint day: 8 August
- Website: Official website

Gallese is an Italian comune (municipality) in the Province of Viterbo, 35 kilometres (22 mi) from Viterbo.

It was taken by Duke Thrasimund II of Spoleto in 737 or 738, at which time it was essential to communications between Rome and Ravenna and had a large fortress.

Pope Marinus I (882–884) was a native of Gallese, as was Pope Romanus, who was head of the Catholic Church in 897.
