= 975 =

Calendar year

975 in various calendars
Gregorian calendar	975; CMLXXV
Ab urbe condita	1728
Armenian calendar	424; ԹՎ ՆԻԴ
Assyrian calendar	5725
Balinese saka calendar	896–897
Bengali calendar	381–382
Berber calendar	1925
Buddhist calendar	1519
Burmese calendar	337
Byzantine calendar	6483–6484
Chinese calendar	甲戌年 (Wood Dog); 3672 or 3465 — to — 乙亥年 (Wood Pig); 3673 or 3466
Coptic calendar	691–692
Discordian calendar	2141
Ethiopian calendar	967–968
Hebrew calendar	4735–4736
- Hindu calendars
Vikram Samvat	1031–1032
Shaka Samvat	896–897
Kali Yuga	4075–4076
Holocene calendar	10975
Iranian calendar	353–354
Islamic calendar	364–365
Japanese calendar	Ten'en 3 (天延３年)
Javanese calendar	876–877
Julian calendar	975; CMLXXV
Korean calendar	3308
Minguo calendar	937 before ROC 民前937年
Nanakshahi calendar	−493
Seleucid era	1286/1287 AG
Thai solar calendar	1517–1518
Tibetan calendar	ཤིང་ཕོ་ཁྱི་ལོ་ (male Wood-Dog); 1101 or 720 or −52 — to — ཤིང་མོ་ཕག་ལོ་ (female Wood-Boar); 1102 or 721 or −51

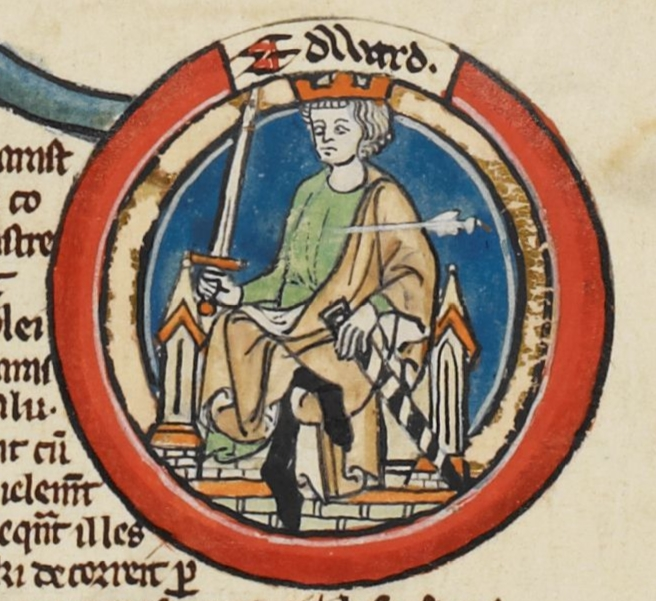
King Edward II (the Martyr) (c. 962–978)

Year 975 (CMLXXV) was a common year starting on Friday of the Julian calendar.

== Events ==
=== By place ===
==== Byzantine Empire ====
- Arab–Byzantine War: Emperor John I raids Mesopotamia and invades Syria, using the Byzantine base at Antioch to press southwards to Tripoli. He conquers the cities of Baalbek, Damascus, Sidon, Tiberias and Caesarea, but fails to take Jerusalem.

==== Europe ====
- October 15 – Oberto I (Obizzo), an Italian count palatine, dies. The Marca Obertenga (Eastern Liguria) is divided among the Obertenghi family.
- Emperor Otto II (the Red) leads a punitive expedition against Boleslaus II, duke of Bohemia (approximate date).

==== England ====
- July 8 – King Edgar I (the Peaceful) dies at Winchester after a 16-year reign. He is succeeded by his 12-year-old son Edward the Martyr as ruler of England.

==== Africa ====
- December 21 – Caliph Al-Mu'izz dies in Egypt after a 22-year reign in which he has extended his realm from Sicily to the Atlantic. He is succeeded by his son Al-Aziz Billah as ruler of the Fatimid Caliphate.

==== China ====
- Emperor Taizu conquers Hunan Province and brings the power of the military under Song control. Ending the era of the warlords (approximate date).

=== By topic ===
==== Religion ====
- March – Otto II appoints his archchancellor Willigis as archbishop of Mainz. He receives the pallium from Pope Benedict VII.

== Births ==
- July 25 – Thietmar, bishop of Merseburg (d. 1018)
- Adalbold II, bishop of Utrecht (d. 1026)
- Amadeus I, count of Savoy (approximate date)
- Bouchard II, French nobleman (d. 1020)
- Conrad I, German nobleman (d. 1011)
- Cunigunde, Holy Roman Empress (d. 1040)
- Elijah, bishop of Beth Nuhadra (d. 1046)
- Gerard I, bishop of Cambrai (approximate date)
- Gero II, German nobleman (d. 1015)
- Guo, empress of the Song Dynasty (d. 1007)
- Hugh of Chalon, French bishop (approximate date)
- Izumi Shikibu, Japanese poet (approximate date)
- Oldřich, duke of Bohemia (approximate date)
- Sophia I, German princess and abbess (d. 1039)
- Stephen I, king of Hungary (approximate date)

== Deaths ==
- June 28
  - Cyneweard, bishop of Wells (Somerset)
  - Thurcytel, abbot of Crowland (approximate date)
- July 4 – Gwangjong (Wang So), Korean king (b. 925)
- July 8 – Edgar I (the Peaceful), king of England
- July 31 – Fu Yanqing, Chinese general (b. 898)
- October 15 – Oberto I, Italian count palatine
- November 12 – Notker Physicus, Swiss painter
- November 26 – Conrad, bishop of Constance
- December 21 – Al-Mu'izz, Fatimid caliph (b. 932)
- December 27 – Balderic, bishop of Utrecht (b. 897)
- Bilgetegin, Samanid officer and governor
- Cináed ua hArtacáin, Irish Gaelic poet
- Dyfnwal ab Owain, king of Strathclyde
- Gu Hongzhong, Chinese painter (b. 937)
- Master Geng, Chinese alchemist
- Olof II, king of Sweden (approximate date)
- Theobald I, Frankish nobleman (b. 913)
- Wynsige (or Wynsy), bishop of Lichfield
- Yongming Yanshou, Chinese Zen master (b. 904)
