= Pope Leo V =

Head of the Catholic Church in 903

- Bishop of Rome
- Church: Catholic Church
- Papacy began: Second half of 903
- Papacy ended: Second half of 903
- Predecessor: Benedict IV
- Successor: Sergius III

Personal details
- Born: Priapi, near Ardea, Papal States
- Died: 903/904 Rome, Papal States

Pope Leo V (died 903/904) was the bishop of Rome and nominal ruler of the Papal States in 903. He was pope immediately before the period known as the Saeculum obscurum, when popes wielded little temporal authority. His papacy occurred in the second half of 903, with exact months being difficult to discern.

Leo V was born at a place called Priapi, near Ardea. Although he was a priest when he was elected pope following the death of Pope Benedict IV (900–903), he was not a cardinal priest of Rome.

During his brief pontificate, Leo granted the canons of Bologna a special bull (epistola tuitionis) where he exempted them from the payment of taxes. However, after a reign of a little over two months, Leo was captured by Christopher, the cardinal-priest of San Lorenzo in Damaso, and thrown into prison. Christopher then had himself elected pope (903–904); until the 19th century he was often considered to have been a legitimate pope. Papal scholar Horace Kinder Mann on the other hand, argued in 1910 that Christopher was likely an antipope.

Leo died shortly after being deposed. He was either murdered on the orders of Christopher in 903, who was in turn executed by Sergius III (904–911) in 904, or, possibly, both were ordered to be killed at the beginning of Sergius’ pontificate, either on the orders of Sergius himself, or by the direction of Sergius' patron, Theophylact I of Tusculum. According to Mann, it is more likely that Leo died a natural death in prison or in a monastery.

== Notes ==
Catholic Church titles
Preceded by Benedict IV	Pope; 903-904	Succeeded by Sergius III
