= List of popes (graphical) =

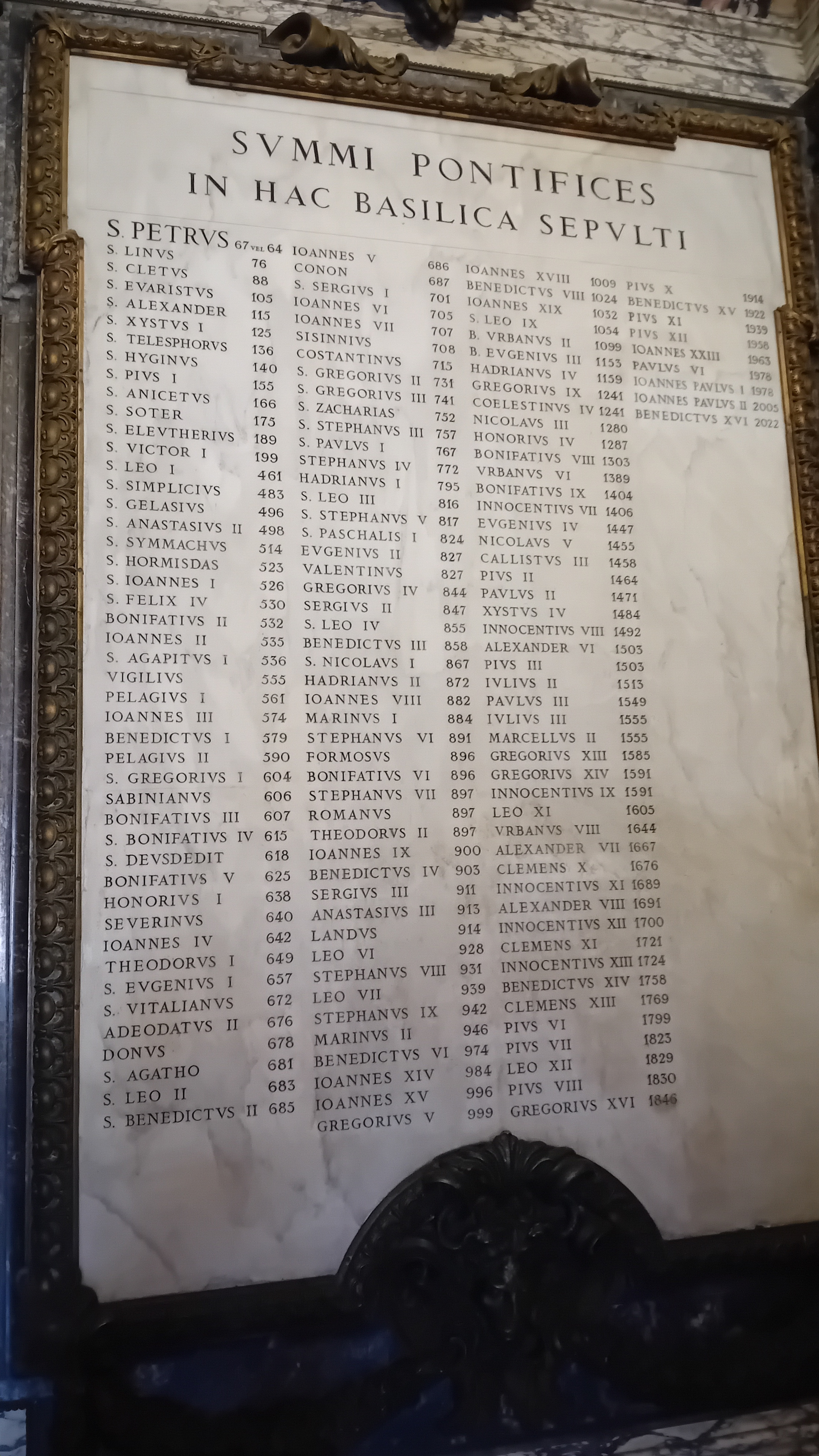
Plaque commemorating popes buried in St Peter's Basilica

This is a graphical list of the popes of the Catholic Church.

While the term pope (Latin: Papa, 'Father') is used in several churches to denote their high spiritual leaders, in English usage, this title generally refers to the supreme head of the Catholic Church and of the Holy See. The title itself has been used officially by the head of the Church since the tenure of Pope Siricius.

There have been 267 popes, as listed by the Annuario Pontificio (Pontifical Yearbook) under the heading 'I Sommi Pontefici Romani' (The Supreme Pontiffs of Rome). Some sources quote a number of 268, with the inclusion of Stephen II, who died four days after his election but before his episcopal consecration. However, only 265 (or 266) men have occupied the chair of Saint Peter, as Benedict IX held the office three times on separate occasions in the mid–11th century.

The pope bears the titles

Bishop of Rome, Vicar of Jesus Christ, Successor of the Prince of the Apostles, Supreme Pontiff of the Universal Church, Primate of Italy, Archbishop and Metropolitan of the Roman Province, Sovereign of the Vatican City State, Servant of the Servants of God

and is officially styled 'His Holiness'.

Since the Lateran Treaty of 1929, the pope's temporal title has been Sovereign of the Vatican City State.

== Graphical depictions of papal reigns ==
Antipopes are shown in red.

== See also ==
- Liber Pontificalis
- List of antipopes
- List of canonised and beatified popes
- List of sexually active popes
- Papal name
- Prophecy of the Popes
