= Pope John IX =

Head of the Catholic Church from 898 to 900

- Bishop of Rome
- Church: Catholic Church
- Papacy began: January 898
- Papacy ended: January 900
- Predecessor: Theodore II
- Successor: Benedict IV

Orders
- Ordination: by Pope Formosus

Personal details
- Born: ca. 825 Tivoli, Papal States
- Died: January 900 (aged about 75) Rome, Papal States

Pope John IX (Latin: Ioannes IX; c. 825 – January 900) was the bishop of Rome and ruler of the Papal States from January 898 to his death in 900.

== Early life ==
Little is known about John IX before he became pope. Born in Tivoli to a man named Rampoaldo, he was ordained as a Benedictine priest by Pope Formosus. With the support of the powerful duke of Spoleto he was elected pope in early 898 following the sudden death of Pope Theodore II.

== Pontificate ==
With a view to diminish the violence of faction in Rome, John held several synods in Rome and elsewhere in 898. They not only confirmed the judgment of Pope Theodore II in granting Christian burial to Pope Formosus, but also at a council held at Ravenna decreed that the records of the Cadaver Synod held by Pope Stephen VI which had condemned him should be burned. Re-ordinations were forbidden, and those of the clergy who had been degraded by Stephen were restored to the ranks from which he had deposed them. The custom of plundering the palaces of bishops or popes on their death was ordered to be put down both by the spiritual and temporal authorities.

To keep their independence, which was threatened by the Germans, the Moravians appealed to John to let them have a hierarchy of their own. Ignoring the complaints of the German hierarchy, John sanctioned the consecration of a metropolitan bishop and three more bishops for the Moravians.

Finding that it was advisable to cement the ties between the empire and the papacy, John IX gave unhesitating support to Lambert of Spoleto in preference to Arnulf of Carinthia during the Synod of Rome, and also induced the council to determine that henceforth the consecration of the Popes should take place only in the presence of the imperial legates. The sudden death of Lambert shattered the hopes which this alliance seemed to promise.

John IX died in the year 900 and was succeeded by Pope Benedict IV (900–903).

== Literature ==
- Gnocchi, Claudia (2000). "Giovanni IX, papa". Dizionario Biografico degli Italiani (in Italian). Vol. 55: Ginammi–Giovanni da Crema. Rome: Istituto dell'Enciclopedia Italiana. ISBN 978-88-12-00032-6.
- Claudia Gnocchi: Giovanni IX. In: Massimo Bray (ed.): Enciclopedia dei Papi. Volume 2: Niccolò I, santo, Sisto IV. Istituto della Enciclopedia Italiana, Rome 2000, pp. 52–52 (treccani.it)
- Rudolf Schieffer (1991). "Johannes IX". Lexikon des Mittelalters, V: Hiera-Mittel bis Lukanien (in German). Stuttgart and Weimar: J. B. Metzler. col. 540. ISBN 3-7608-8905-0.

Catholic Church titles
Preceded by Theodore II	Pope; 898–900	Succeeded by Benedict IV
