= Pope Marinus I =

Head of the Catholic Church from 882 to 884

- Bishop of Rome
- Church: Catholic Church
- Papacy began: 16 December 882
- Papacy ended: 15 May 884
- Predecessor: John VIII
- Successor: Adrian III
- Previous post: Bishop of Caere

Personal details
- Born: 830 Gallese, Papal States
- Died: 15 May 884 (aged c. 54) Rome, Papal States

Pope Marinus I (/məˈraɪnəs/ mə-RY-nəs; died 15 May 884) was the bishop of Rome and leader of the Papal States from 882 until his death on 15 May 884. Controversially at the time, he was already a bishop when he became pope, and had served as papal legate to Constantinople. He was also erroneously called Pope Martin II (Latin: Martinus II) leading to the second pope named Martin to take the name Martin IV.

== Ecclesiastical career ==
=== Diplomat to the East ===
Born at Gallese, Marinus was the son of a priest. He would become an expert on relations with the Eastern church, starting this path when he assisted as subdeacon the welcome of ambassadors of emperor Michael III in 860. He was ordained as a deacon by Pope Nicholas I and then sent in 866 to Constantinople to discuss the religious leadership over the newly converted Bulgarians though the embassy was turned back at the Byzantine border. Marinus was sent again in 869 as one of pope Adrian II's legates who presided over the eighth ecumenical council in Constantinople which deposed the Patriarch Photios I of Constantinople. His profile became popular after and some time afterwards he became bishop of Caere, possibly to prevent his becoming archbishop of Bulgaria as one of king Boris' favourite candidates.

On three occasions, he had been employed by the three popes who preceded him as legate to Constantinople, his mission in each case having reference to the controversy started by Patriarch Photios I of Constantinople. In 882, he was sent on behalf of Pope John VIII to Duke Athanasius of Naples to warn him not to trade with the Muslims of southern Italy. During that time, he also served as treasurer to the Holy See.

=== Papacy ===
Marinus I was elected to succeed John VIII as bishop of Rome from around the end of December 882. This papal election was controversial because Marinus had already been consecrated as bishop of Caere; at the time, a bishop was expected never to move to another see. Among his first acts as pope were the reinstatement of Formosus as cardinal bishop of Portus and the anathematizing of Photius I. Due to his respect for Alfred the Great (r. 871–899), he freed the Anglo-Saxons of the Schola Anglorum in Rome from tribute and taxation. He also is recorded to have sent a piece of the True Cross to Alfred as a gift. He died in May 884 and was buried in St. Peter's basilica in Rome, his successor being Adrian III.

== Name error ==
Because of the similarity of the names, Marinus I and Marinus II were, in some sources, mistakenly called Martinus II and Martinus III.

Catholic Church titles
Preceded by John VIII	Pope; 882–884	Succeeded by Adrian III
