= Alexis-François Artaud de Montor =

French diplomat and historian (1772–1849)

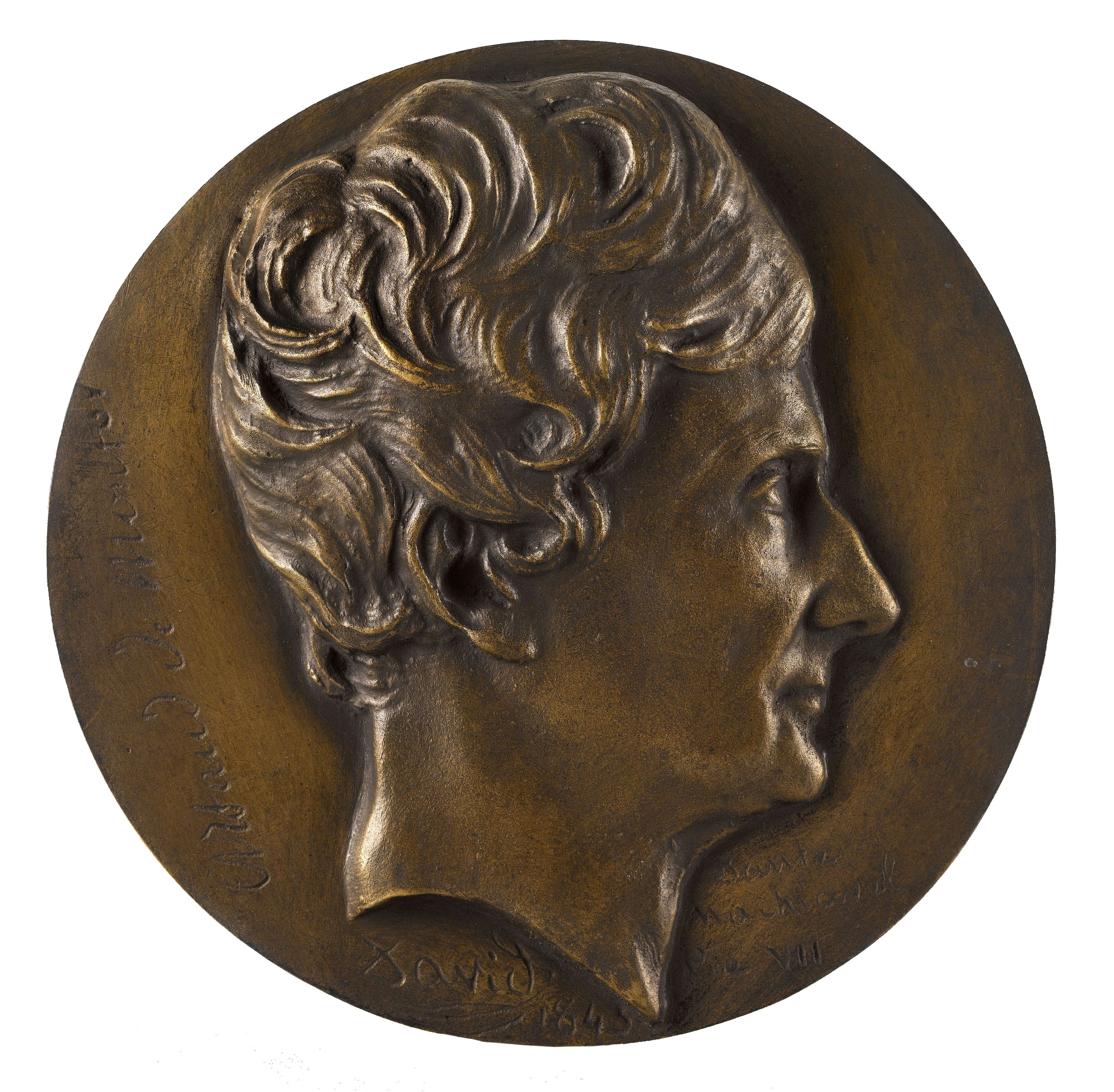
- Portrait d'Alexis-François Artaud de Montor par David d'Angers en 1843, musée Carnavalet.
- Born: 21 July 1772; Paris
- Died: 12 November 1849; Paris
- Occupations: Art collector, art historian, diplomat, historian, translator

Alexis-François Artaud De Montor (21 July 1772 – 12 November 1849) was a diplomat and historian. An émigré during the French Revolution, he was entrusted by the royal princes with missions to the Holy See and served during the campaign of Champagne in the Army of Condé. Napoleon Bonaparte made him secretary of the French Legation in Rome. Artaud occupied this post under François Cacault, left Rome for a short time when Cardinal Joseph Fesch, Cacault's successor, brought Chateaubriand with him, and returned to Rome in the same capacity after Chateaubriand had resigned. Appointed chargé d'affaires of France to Florence in 1805, he was recalled in 1807 because he was wrongfully suspected of having employed his power on behalf of the Queen of Etruria, whose possessions Napoleon wished to give to Elisa Bonaparte.

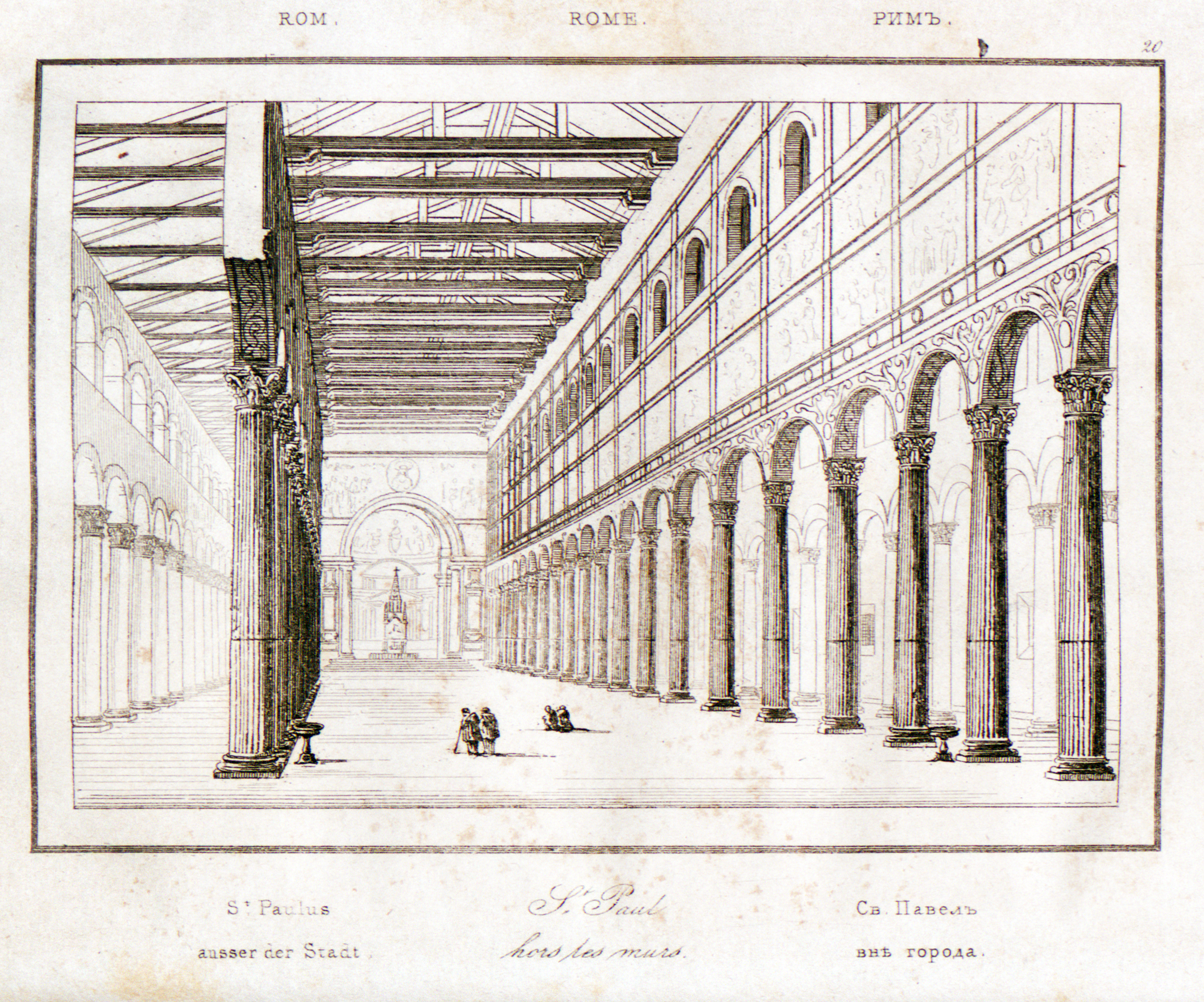
Illustration of Saint Paul Outside the Walls, from Italie, 1835

Made censor during the last years of the empire, he became under the Bourbon Restoration secretary of the embassy in Vienna, then again in Rome. In 1830 he retired on a pension to devote himself exclusively to literary works. Besides his translation of Dante's Divina Commedia (1811–1813) which was rated very highly, Artaud de Montor left several historical works:

- Machiavel, son génie et ses erreurs (Machiavelli, his genius and his errors; Paris, 1833);
- the volume on the history of Italy in the collection of the Univers pittoresque (Paris, 1834);
- Histoire du pape Pie VII (2 vols., Paris, 1836);
- Histoire de Dante Alighieri (Paris, 1841);
- Histoire des souverains pontifes romains (8 vols., Paris, 1842);
- Histoire de Léon XII (Paris, 1843);
- Histoire de Pie VIII (Paris, 1843).

Shortly before his death, in 1849 when Pius IX was banished to Gaeta, Artaud de Montor published a work entitled: La papauté et les émeutes romaines. His recollections and his observations as a diplomat form part of Artaud de Montor's historical works. He was a member of the Académie des Inscriptions et Belles-Lettres from 17 Dec., 1830.

== Works ==
- Italie. Paris: Firmin Didot. 1835.
- Encyclopedie des Gens du Monde. Paris: Librairie de Treuttel et Würtz. 1833–45.
