= Pope Adrian III =

Head of the Catholic Church from 884 to 885

Pope Saint Adrian III
- Bishop of Rome
- Death of Adrian III, from a relief in the Abbey of Nonantola, c. 1122
- Church: Catholic Church
- Papacy began: 17 May 884
- Papacy ended: 8 July 885
- Predecessor: Marinus I
- Successor: Stephen V

Personal details
- Born: Rome, Papal States
- Died: 8 July 885 Modena, Carolingian Empire

Sainthood
- Feast day: 8 July
- Venerated in: Catholic Church
- Canonized: 2 June 1891; Rome, Kingdom of Italy by Leo XIII

Pope Adrian III or Hadrian III (Latin: Adrianus or Hadrianus; died 8 July 885) was the bishop of Rome and leader of the Papal States from 17 May 884 to his death on 8 July 885. He served for little more than a year, during which he worked to help the people of Italy in a very troubled time of famine and war.

== Background ==
Adrian III was born in Rome. According to Jean Mabillon, his birth name was Agapitus. Reginald L. Poole believes that Mabillon confused Adrian III, who succeeded Marinus I, with Agapetus II, who succeeded Marinus II a century later.

== Pontificate ==
Adrian laboured hard to alleviate the misery of the people of Italy, prey to famine and to continuous war. He is also known to have written a letter condemning the Christians of both Muslim-ruled and Christian-ruled parts of Spain for being too friendly with the Jews in these lands. Adrian also sent Theodosius, the bishop of Brindisi and Oria, to Constantinople to deliver a synodal letter about faith and the filioque to patriarch Photius I.

Adrian died in July 885 at San Cesario sul Panaro (Modena), not long after embarking on a trip to Worms, in the Rhineland. The purpose of the journey was to attend an Imperial Diet after being summoned by Emperor Charles the Fat to settle the imperial succession and discuss the rising power of the Saracens.

Adrian's death and subsequent burial in the church of San Silvestro Nonantola Abbey near Modena is commemorated in the sculpted reliefs (c. 1122) that frame the doorway of this church. His relics are found near the high altar, and his tomb at once became a popular place of pilgrimage. His cult was confirmed by Pope Leo XIII on 2 June 1891, and his feast day is celebrated on 8 July. Orthodox Feasts dates are 8 and 30 July.

== See also ==
- List of Catholic saints
- List of popes

Catholic Church titles
Preceded by Marinus I	Pope; 884–885	Succeeded by Stephen V
