= Cadaver Synod =

897 posthumous trial of Pope Formosus

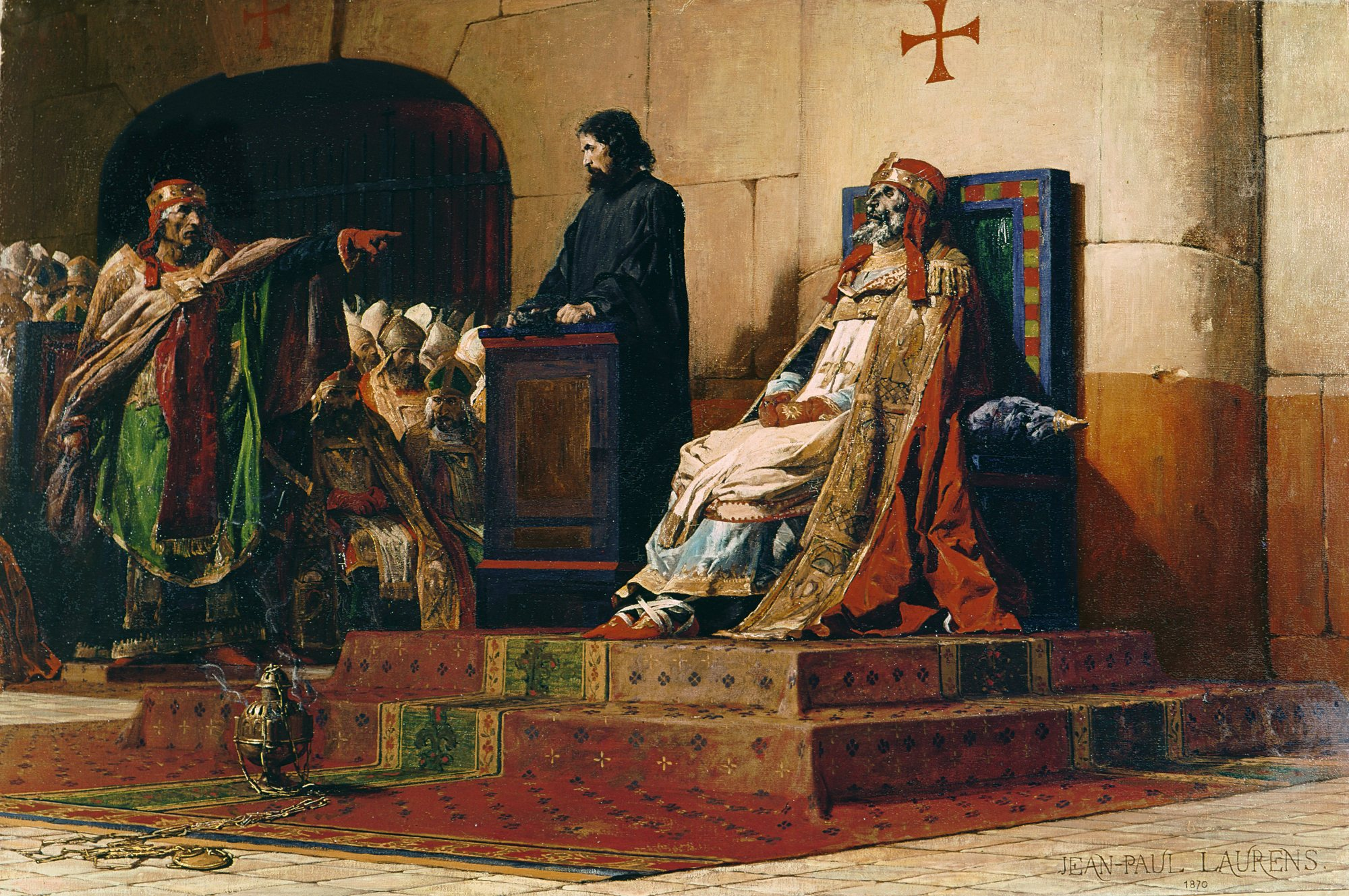
- Le Pape Formose et Étienne VI ("Pope Formosus and Stephen VI") by Jean-Paul Laurens, 1870
- Date: January 897
- Venue: Basilica of St. John Lateran
- Location: Rome, Papal States
- Type: Posthumous ecclesiastical trial
- Cause: Alleged perjury and illegal accession of Pope Formosus
- Outcome: Pope Formosus's papacy declared null

The Cadaver Synod (also called the Cadaver Trial; Latin: Synodus Horrenda) is the name commonly given to the ecclesiastical trial of Pope Formosus, who had been dead for about nine months, in the Basilica of St. John Lateran in Rome during January 897. The trial was conducted by Pope Stephen VI, the successor to Formosus's successor, Pope Boniface VI. Stephen had Formosus's corpse exhumed and brought to the papal court for judgment. He accused Formosus of perjury, of having acceded to the papacy illegally, and illegally presiding over more than one diocese at the same time. At the end of the trial, Formosus was pronounced guilty, and his papacy retroactively declared null.

== Context ==
The Cadaver Synod and related events took place during a period of political instability in Italy. This period, which lasted from the middle of the 9th century to the middle of the 10th century, was marked by a rapid succession of pontiffs. Between 872 and 965, two dozen popes were appointed, and between 896 and 904 there was, on average, a new pope every year. Often, these brief papal reigns were the result of the political machinations of local Roman factions, about which few sources survive.

Formosus became bishop of Porto-Santa Rufina in 864 during the pontificate of Pope Nicholas I. In 866 he was sent as a legate to Bulgaria, and was so successful in this position that the Bulgarian ruler Boris I asked the pope to appoint him archbishop of Bulgaria. Nicholas refused to give permission, because the fifteenth canon of the Second Council of Nicaea forbade a bishop from administering more than one see — "a law that was supposed to prevent bishops from building up their own little fiefdoms." He also travelled to Constantinople, and the Carolingian court, where he met Arnulf of Carinthia, a Frankish Carolingian king who aspired to the throne of Italy.

In 875, shortly after Charles the Bald's imperial coronation, Formosus fled Rome in fear of then-pope John VIII. A few months later in 876, at a synod in Santa Maria Rotunda, John VIII issued a series of accusations against Formosus and some of his associates. He asserted that Formosus had corrupted the mind of the Bulgarians "so that, so long as [Formosus] was alive, [they] would not accept any other bishop from the apostolic see," that he and his fellow conspirators had attempted to usurp the papacy from John, and finally that he had deserted his see in Porto and was conspiring "against the salvation of the state and of our beloved Charles [the Bald]." Formosus and his associates were excommunicated.

In 879, at another council held at Troyes, John may have confirmed the excommunications. He also legislated more generally against those who "plunder" ecclesiastical goods. According to the tenth-century author Auxilius of Naples, Formosus was also present at this council. According to Auxilius, Formosus begged the bishops for their forgiveness, and in return for removal of the excommunication, swore an oath to remain a layman for the rest of his life, to never again enter Rome, and to make no attempts to resume his former see at Porto. This story is dubious: another description of the synod does not mention Formosus's presence, and says instead that John confirmed his excommunication.

After the death of John VIII in December 882, Formosus's troubles ended. He resumed his bishopric at Porto, where he remained until elected pope on 6 October 891. Yet this earlier quarrel with John VIII formed the basis of the accusations made at the Cadaver Synod. According to the tenth-century historian Liutprand of Cremona, Stephen VI asked Formosus's corpse why he "usurped the universal Roman See in such a spirit of ambition" after the death of John VIII, echoing John VIII's own assertion that Formosus had tried to seize the papal throne while he was alive. Formosus, being several months dead, could not answer. Two further accusations were also made against Formosus at the Cadaver Synod: that he had committed perjury and that he had attempted to exercise the office of bishop as a layman. These are related to the oath Formosus is said to have sworn before the council at Troyes in 878.

== Immediate context ==
The Cadaver Synod is generally presumed to have been politically motivated. Formosus crowned Lambert of Spoleto co-ruler of the Holy Roman Empire in 892; Lambert's father, Guy III of Spoleto, had earlier been crowned by John VIII. In 893 Formosus, apparently nervous about Guy's aggression, invited the Carolingian Arnulf of Carinthia to invade Italy and receive the imperial crown. Arnulf's invasion failed, and Guy III died shortly afterwards. Yet Formosus renewed his invitation to Arnulf in 895, and early the next year Arnulf crossed the Alps and entered Rome, where Formosus crowned him as Holy Roman Emperor. Afterwards the Frankish army departed, and Formosus died in 896. Formosus was succeeded by Pope Boniface VI, who himself died two weeks later. Lambert and his mother, the empress Angiltrude, entered Rome around the time that Stephen VI became pope, and the Cadaver Synod was conducted directly afterwards, at the beginning of 897.

The dominant interpretation of these events until the early twentieth century was straightforward: Formosus had always been a pro-Carolingian, and his crowning of Lambert in 892 was coerced. After the death of Arnulf and the collapse of Carolingian authority in Rome, Lambert entered the city and forced Stephen to convene the Cadaver Synod, both to re-assert his claim to the imperial crown and perhaps also to exact posthumous revenge upon Formosus.

This view is now considered obsolete, following the arguments put forth by Joseph Duhr in 1932. Duhr pointed out that Lambert was in attendance at the Ravenna Council of 898, convened under Pope John IX. It was at this proceeding that the decrees of the Cadaver Synod were revoked. According to the written acta of the council, Lambert actively approved of the nullification. If Lambert and Angiltrude had been the architects of Formosus's degradation, Duhr asked, "how [...] was John IX able to submit to the canons which condemned the odious synod for approbation of the emperor [i.e., Lambert] and his bishops? How could John IX have dared to broach the matter [...] before the guilty parties, without even making the least allusion to the emperor's participation?" This position has been accepted by another scholar: Girolamo Arnaldi argued that Formosus did not pursue an exclusively pro-Carolingian policy, and that he even had friendly relations with Lambert as late as 895. Their relations only soured when Lambert's cousin, Guy IV of Spoleto, marched on Benevento and expelled the Byzantines there. Formosus panicked at the aggression and sent emissaries into Bavaria seeking Arnulf's help. Arnaldi argues that it was Guy IV, who had entered Rome along with Lambert and his mother Angiltrude in January 897, who provided the impetus for the synod.

== Synod ==
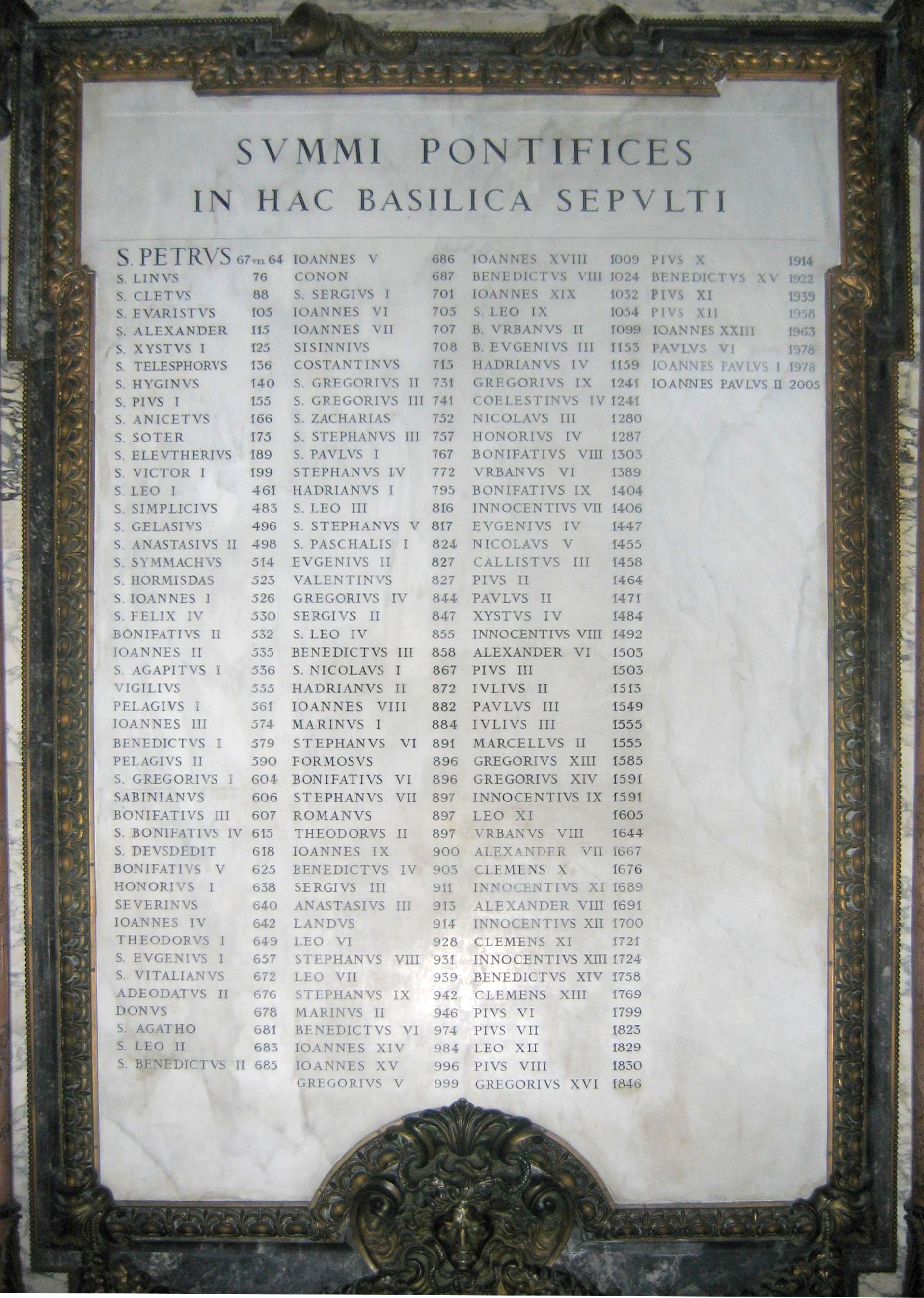
The list of popes buried in Saint Peter's Basilica includes the recovered body of Pope Formosus.

Probably around January 897, Stephen VI ordered that the corpse of his predecessor Formosus be removed from its tomb and brought to the papal court for judgment. With the corpse propped up on a throne, a deacon was appointed to answer for the deceased pontiff.

Formosus was accused of transmigrating sees in violation of canon law, of perjury, and of serving as a bishop while actually a layman. According to Liutprand, Stephen VI said: "When you were bishop of Porto, why did you usurp the universal Roman See in such a spirit of ambition?"

Eventually, the corpse was found guilty. Liutprand of Cremona and other sources say that, after having the corpse stripped of its papal vestments, Stephen then cut off the three fingers of the right hand (the blessing fingers), next formally invalidating all of Formosus's acts and ordinations (including his ordination of Stephen VI as bishop of Anagni). The body was dressed in the garb of a layman and quickly interred in a graveyard for foreigners, only to be dug up once again, tied to weights, and cast into the Tiber River.

== Aftermath ==
The macabre spectacle excited a tumult and turned public opinion in Rome against Stephen. Formosus's body washed up on the banks of the Tiber, and rumor had it that his waterlogged rotting corpse was still performing miracles. A public uprising deposed and imprisoned Stephen. He was strangled in prison in July or August 897.

In December 897 Pope Theodore II (897) convened a synod that annulled the Cadaver Synod, rehabilitated Formosus, and ordered that his body, which had been recovered from the Tiber, be reburied in Saint Peter's Basilica in pontifical vestments. In 898, John IX (898–900) also nullified the Cadaver Synod, convening one synod in Rome, and another in Ravenna. The two synods, which affirmed the findings of Theodore II's synod, ordered the acta of the Cadaver Synod destroyed, excommunicated seven cardinals involved in the Cadaver Synod, and prohibited any trial of a corpse in the future.

== See also ==
- Damnatio memoriae
- Devil's advocate
- List of excommunicable offences in the Catholic Church
- List of people excommunicated by the Catholic Church
- Posthumous execution
- Pope Boniface VIII
- The Ring and the Book
