= Pope Boniface VI =

Head of the Catholic Church in 896

- Bishop of Rome
- Church: Catholic Church
- Papacy began: 11 April 896
- Papacy ended: 26 April 896
- Predecessor: Formosus
- Successor: Stephen VI

Personal details
- Born: Rome, Papal States
- Died: 26 April 896 Rome, Papal States

Pope Boniface VI (Latin: Bonifatius VI; died 26 April 896), a native of Rome, served very briefly as the bishop of Rome and ruler of the Papal States in April of 896. He was elected as a result of riots soon after the death of Pope Formosus on April 4. Prior to his reign, he had twice incurred a sentence of deprivation of orders as a subdeacon and as a priest. After a pontificate of fifteen days, he is said by some to have died of gout, and by others to have been forcibly ejected to make way for Stephen VI, the candidate of the Spoletan party.

The Papal historian Caesar Baronius describes him as a 'disgusting monster' guilty of adultery and homicide.

At a synod in Rome held by John IX in 898, his election was pronounced null and void.

Little is written about the life of Boniface VI. It is believed by historians that his father was a man called Adrian, who was also a bishop. He then likely served as a sub-deacon or priest before his election to the papacy.

== See also ==
- List of shortest-reigning popes

Catholic Church titles
Preceded by Formosus	Pope; 896	Succeeded by Stephen VI
