= Pope Stephen VI =

Head of the Catholic Church from 896 to 897

- Bishop of Rome
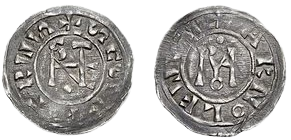
- Denier in the name of pope Stephen VI and emperor Arnulf of Carinthia
- Church: Catholic Church
- Papacy began: 22 May 896
- Papacy ended: August 897
- Predecessor: Boniface VI
- Successor: Romanus

Personal details
- Born: Rome, Papal States
- Died: August 897 Rome, Papal States

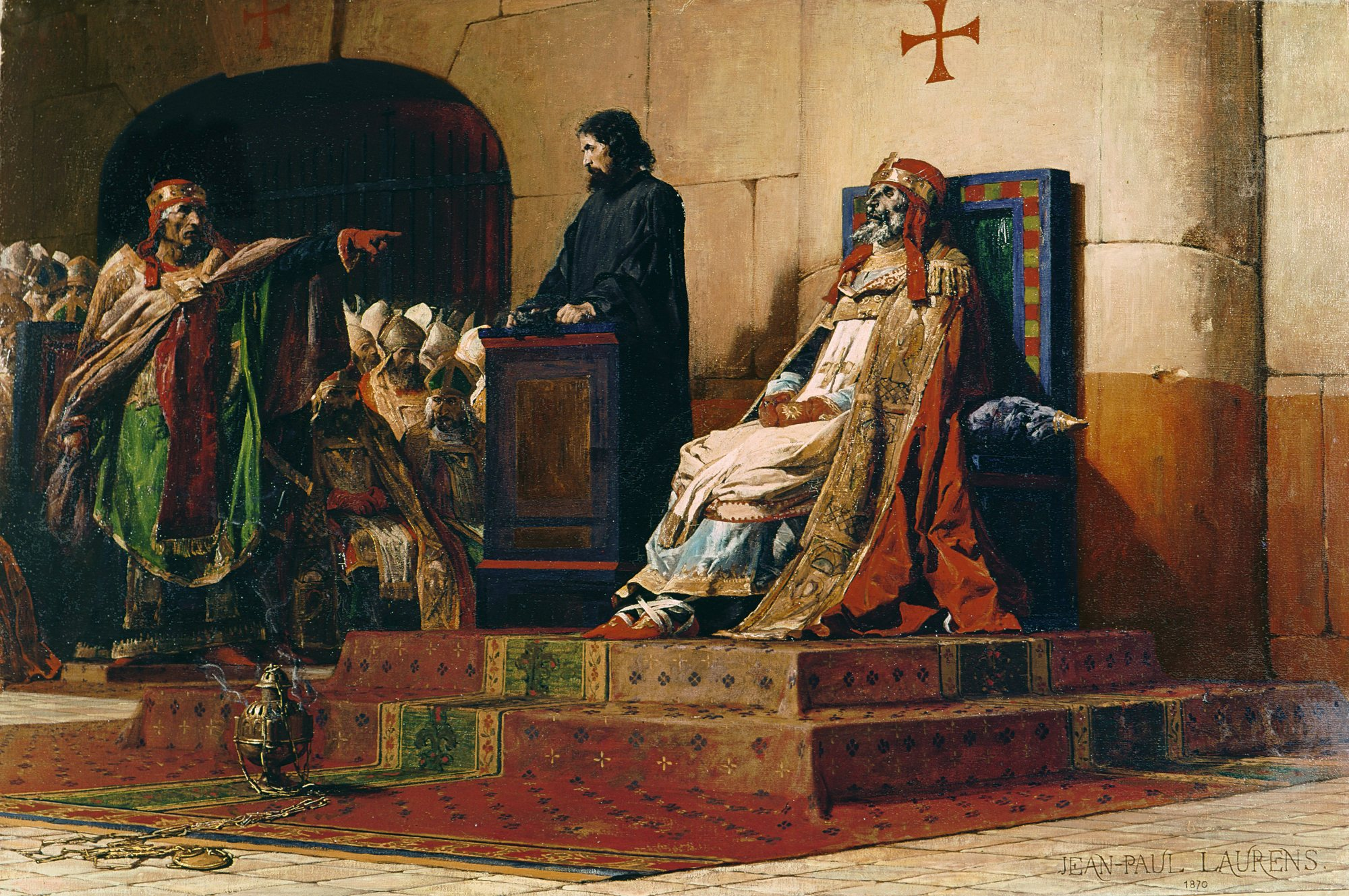
Jean-Paul Laurens, Le Pape Formose et Étienne VI, 1870; Stephen (at left) accuses the corpse of his predecessor Formosus (seated right)

Pope Stephen VI (Latin: Stephanus VI; died August 897) was the bishop of Rome and ruler of the Papal States from 22 May 896 until his death in August 897. He is best known for instigating the Cadaver Synod, which ultimately led to his downfall and death.

== Family and career ==
Stephen was born in Rome. His father was a priest named John. Stephen was made bishop of Anagni by Pope Formosus, possibly against his will.

== Pontificate ==
The circumstances of his election as pope are unclear, but he was sponsored by one of the powerful Roman families, the dukes of Spoleto, that contested the papacy at the time.

An earthquake severely damaged the Archbasilica of Saint John Lateran during Stephen VI's tenure and the poor state of Papal finances meant that it was not repaired for years. The structure was not repaired until the reign of Pope Sergius III.

Stephen is chiefly remembered in connection with his conduct towards the remains of Pope Formosus. The rotting corpse of Formosus was exhumed and put on trial, before an unwilling synod of the Roman clergy, in the so-called Cadaver Synod in January 897. Pressure from the Spoleto contingent and Stephen's fury with Formosus probably precipitated this extraordinary event. With the corpse propped up on a throne, a deacon was appointed to answer for the deceased pontiff. During the trial, Formosus's corpse was condemned for performing the functions of a bishop when he had been deposed and for accepting the papacy while he was the bishop of Portus, among other revived charges that had been levelled against him in the strife during the pontificate of John VIII. The corpse was found guilty, stripped of its sacred vestments, deprived of three fingers of its right hand (the blessing fingers), clad in the garb of a layman, and quickly buried; it was then re-exhumed and thrown in the Tiber. All ordinations performed by Formosus were annulled.

The trial excited a tumult. Though the instigators of the deed may actually have been Formosus' Spoletan enemies, notably Guy IV of Spoleto, who had recovered their authority in Rome at the beginning of 897 by renouncing their broader claims in central Italy, the scandal ended in Stephen's imprisonment and his death by strangulation that summer.

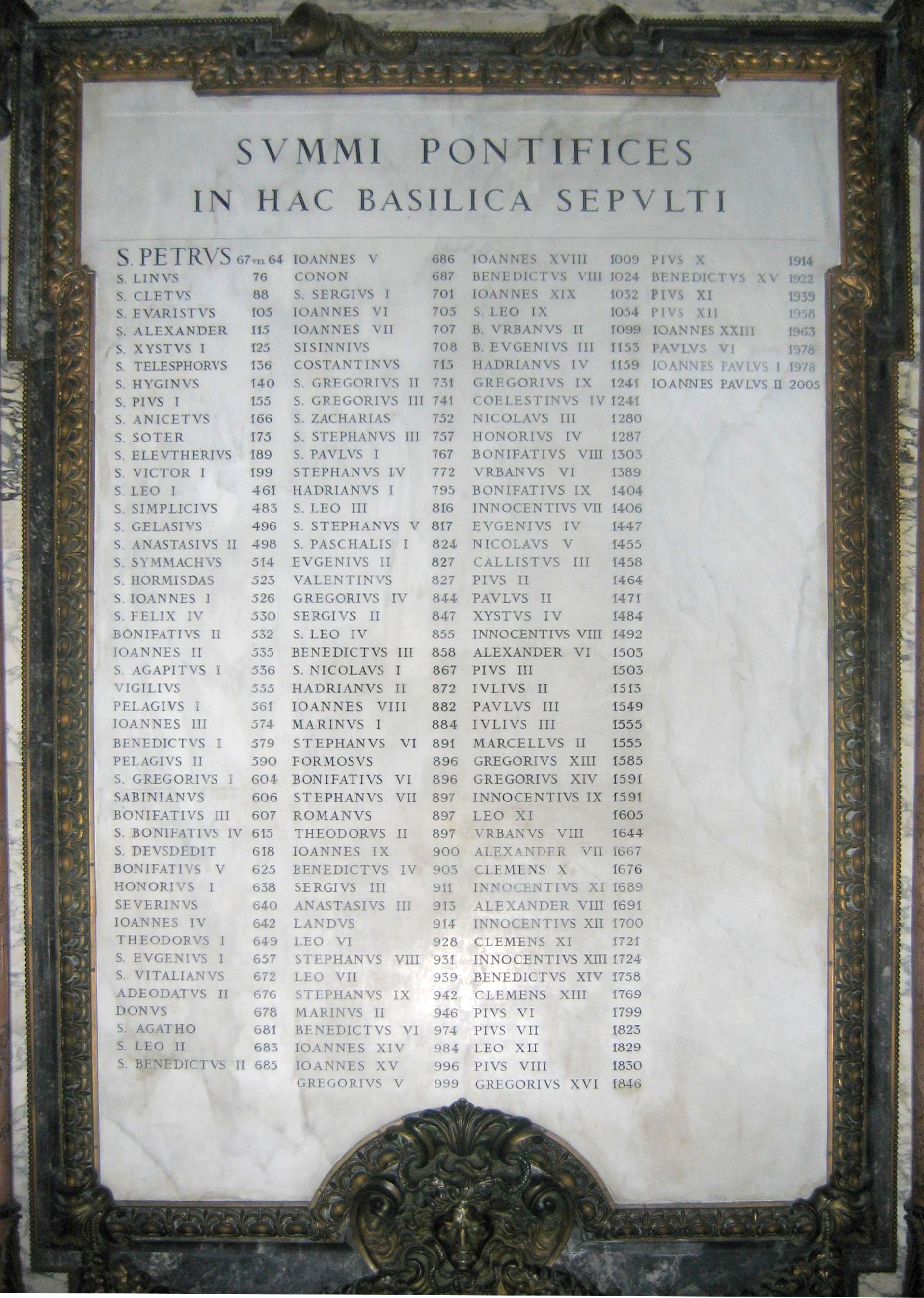
Even though he was overthrown, the list of popes buried in Saint Peter's Basilica includes Stephen VI.

== See also ==
- List of popes who died violently
- The Bad Popes

== Works cited ==
- Osborne, John (2025). Rome in the Tenth Century: A History in Art. Cambridge University Press. ISBN 9781009639705.

Catholic Church titles
Preceded by Boniface VI	Pope; 896–897	Succeeded by Romanus
