= Pope Formosus =

Head of the Catholic Church from 891 to 896

- Bishop of Rome
- Church: Catholic Church
- Papacy began: 6 October 891
- Papacy ended: 4 April 896
- Predecessor: Stephen V
- Successor: Boniface VI

Personal details
- Born: c. 816 Rome, Papal States
- Died: 4 April 896 (aged c. 80) Rome, Papal States

Pope Formosus (c. 816 – 4 April 896) was the pope and ruler of the Papal States from 6 October 891 until his death on 4 April 896. His reign as Pope was troubled, marked by interventions in power struggles over the Patriarchate of Constantinople, the Kingdom of West Francia, and the Holy Roman Empire. Because he sided with Arnulf of Carinthia against Lambert of Spoleto, Formosus's remains were exhumed and put on trial in the Cadaver Synod. Several of his immediate successors were primarily preoccupied by the controversial legacy of his pontificate, noting his desertion from the diocese in Portus to pursue personal ambition in Rome. Formosus was seen as failing to uphold the ideals of the Church, which is why Stephen VI judged him for moving into an elevated role while holding another. Due to these controversies, no other pope has ever taken on the papal name Formosus.

== Early career ==
Formosus was born around 816 within the Papal States of Italy in the area surrounding Rome. Formosus's career became notable within the Church when he was appointed as cardinal bishop of the suburbicarian diocese of Portus in 864. Shortly thereafter, Pope Nicholas I sent Formosus as a legate to Bulgaria in 866, where he served as a papal envoy and participated in the ordinations of Slavic followers of Cyril and Methodius of Rome. In 867, Boris I requested that Formosus be named archbishop of Bulgaria due to his connection with the bishop. The Church did not allow Formosus to change sees as Formosus already held the position of Archbishop of Portus. The transfer of sees went against canon law, as the Church viewed archbishops similarly to the way they viewed marriage. Bishops could not change sees unless it served the best interests of the Church, and Formosus's transfer was seen as transmigration, or the transfer of episcopal sees in the pursuit of personal ambition. Formosus was looking to expand his own influence within the Church, and there were few bishoprics within Europe as it was a vast wilderness with villages few and far between. If he were to take the position as bishop to Bulgaria, not only would Formosus be enforcing the Catholic Church's interests in an area near to the Orthodox Byzantine Empire, but he would also have control over a larger amount of land than his original see of Portus. He also undertook diplomatic missions to France in 869 and 872.

Upon the death of Holy Roman Emperor Louis II of Italy in 875, the nobles elected his uncle Charles the Bald as the new emperor. Formosus conveyed Pope John VIII's invitation for Charles to come to Rome to be crowned. Charles took the crown at Pavia and received the imperial insignia in Rome on 29 December. The supporters of Louis' other uncle, Louis the German, and of Louis's widow, Engelberga, opposed the coronation. Fearing political retribution, many of them left Rome surreptitiously. Formosus fled to Tours. On 19 April, John VIII called a synod which ordered Formosus and other papal officials to return to Rome. When Formosus did not comply, he was removed from the ranks of the clergy and excommunicated on the grounds that he had deserted his diocese without papal permission, and had aspired to the position of archbishop of Bulgaria. Additional charges included the accusations that he had opposed the emperor; "conspired with certain iniquitous men and women for the destruction of the Papal See"; and had "despoiled the cloisters" in Rome. The condemnation of Formosus and others was announced in July 876. In 878 the sentence of excommunication was withdrawn after he promised never to return to Rome or exercise his priestly functions.

As early as 872 he was a candidate for the papacy; Johann Peter Kirsch suggests that the Pope may have viewed him as a potential rival. In 883, John VIII's successor, Pope Marinus I, restored Formosus to his suburbicarian diocese of Portus. In the Cadaver synod, one of the key accusations made by Pope Stephen VI against Formosus was that he abandoned his seat as Bishop of Porto to become the Bishop of Rome. This act was monumental because it had rarely been done, and the oath was seen as a serious matter. Following the reigns of Marinus, Pope Adrian III (884–885), and Pope Stephen V (885–891), Formosus was unanimously elected Pope on 6 October 891.

== Papacy ==
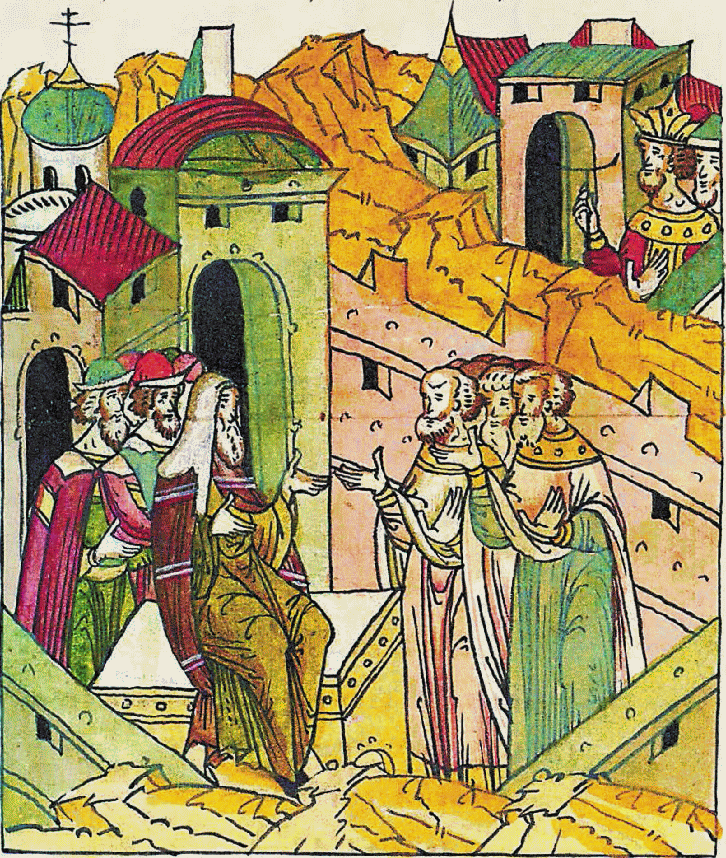
A 16th century depiction of Formosus's Papacy, from the Facial Chronicle

=== Photian schism ===
Shortly after his election, Formosus was asked to intervene in the Patriarchate of Constantinople, where Photios I had been ejected and Stephen I, the son of Emperor Basil I, had taken the office. Popes had taken on more secular authority in Rome during the Ninth Century due to a decline of Roman urban administration. Formosus refused to reinstate those who had been ordained by Photios, as his predecessor, Stephen V, had nullified all of Photios's ordinations. However, the Eastern bishops determined to recognize Photios's ordinations nonetheless.

Formosus simultaneously involved himself in the dispute between Odo of Paris and Charles the Simple for the French throne. Siding with Charles, Formosus zealously exhorted Odo to cede the throne to Charles, to no avail.

=== Guy III of Spoleto ===
Formosus later involved himself in another conflict, in which Arnulf of Carinthia, the King of Germany, was marching through Tuscany on his way to Rome, and was met with the forces of Guy III of Spoleto, now the Roman Emperor, at the gates of Ivrea. Arnulf took the city after a siege, which began a feud between the two powerful figures. Formosus had trouble building a relationship with Guy, which caused him to become deeply distrustful of Guy and begin to look for support against him. This act went against those of the previous popes, when the papacy's rule was dependent on their relationship with, and the image of, the emperor. To bolster his position, Guy forced Formosus to crown his son Lambert as co-emperor in April 892. Stephen V and Formosus became the first two popes to crown a non-Carolingian man Emperor of Rome in almost a century, presenting the title to Guy III, the marquis of Spoleto, and later to his son, Lambert. The following year, however, Formosus persuaded Arnulf of Carinthia to advance to Rome and liberate Italy from Guy's control, as the faction of “Spoletans” aligned themselves with Agiltrude, Guy’s wife. In 894, Arnulf's army occupied all the country north of the Po River. Guy died in December, leaving his son Lambert in the care of his mother, Agiltrude, who was an opponent of the Carolingians. In autumn 895, Arnulf undertook his second Italian campaign, progressing to Rome by February and seizing the city from Agiltrude by force on 21 February. The following day, Formosus crowned Arnulf as emperor in St. Peter's Basilica. Formosus successfully protected his position in the papacy by orchestrating Arnulf's invasion. The new emperor moved against Spoleto but was struck with paralysis on the way and was unable to continue the campaign.

=== Muslim incursions ===
During his papacy, Formosus also had to contend with the Saracens, who were attacking Lazio. While Muslims encroached upon Christian territory, Formosus took a staunch anti-diplomatic approach as pope, supporting violent military campaigns to eliminate the foreign threat and reinstate the Papacy’s influence over the area. Emperor Guy led these campaigns until his death in 894, and other rulers took up the cause after him. On 4 April 896, Formosus died. The cause of his death remains unclear. He was succeeded by Boniface VI, whose papacy lasted 15 days.

== Legacy ==
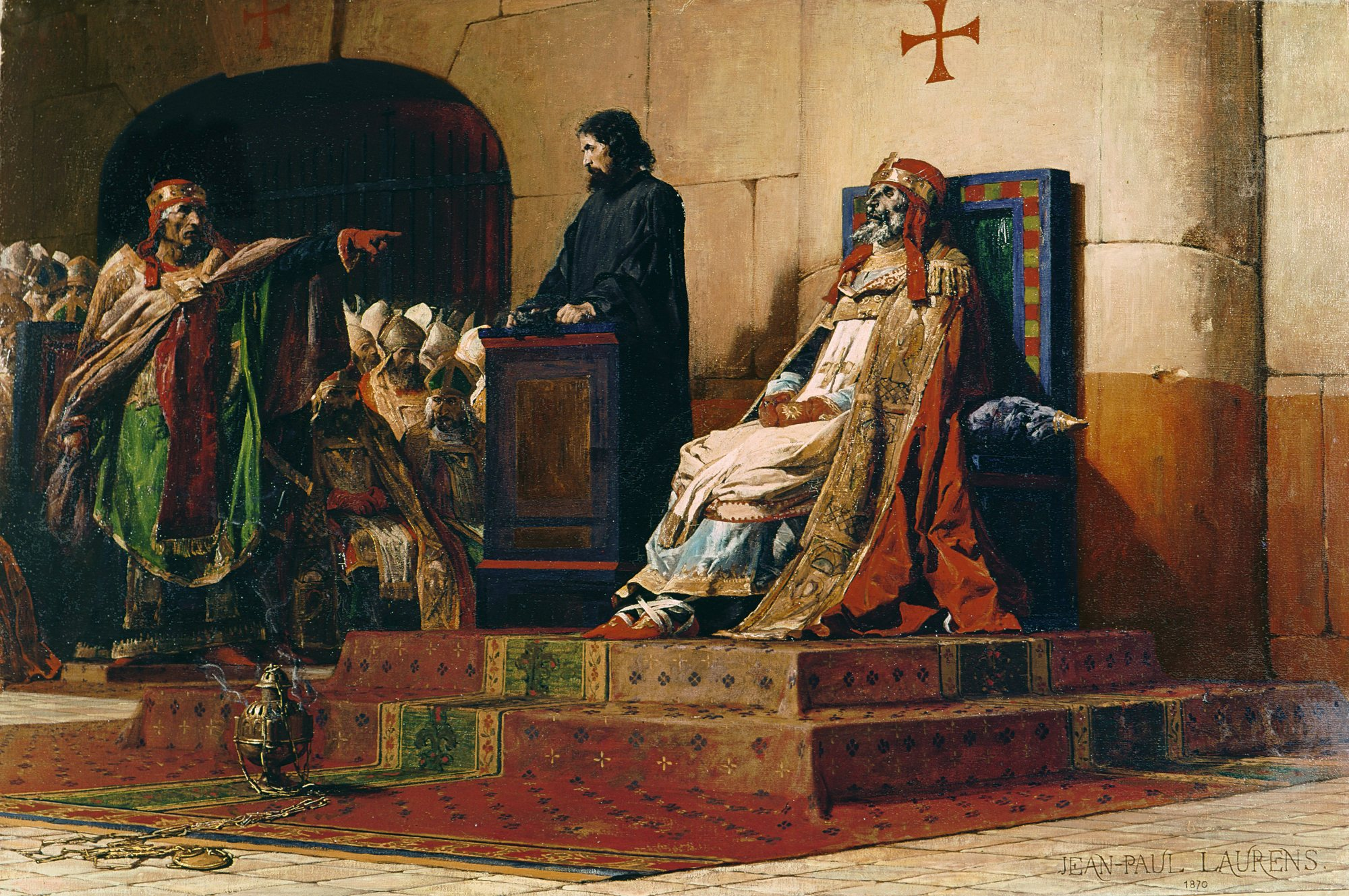
The Cadaver Synod as portrayed by Jean-Paul Laurens in 1870

Stephen VI, the successor of Boniface VI, influenced by Lambert and Agiltrude, sat in judgment of Formosus. In 897, nine months after Formosus's death, in what is known as the Cadaver Synod, where the pope’s body was exhumed and forced to stand trial. The Synod was an attempt for the church to distance itself from the memory of Formosus, and was an example of violence being used to destroy the symbolism behind the former pope. The corpse was disinterred, clad in papal vestments, and seated on a throne to face all the charges from John VIII. The verdict stated that the deceased pope had been unworthy of the pontificate, and the damnatio memoriae was applied to Formosus. All of Formosus's measures and acts were annulled, and the orders conferred by him were declared invalid. The papal vestments were torn from his body, the three fingers from his right hand he had used in blessings were cut off, and the corpse was thrown into the Tiber, later to be retrieved by fishermen. In certain historiographical essays, such as Dyan Elliott's "Violence Against the Dead: The Negative Translation and ‘Damnatio Memoriae’ in the Middle Ages," scholars depict the body of Pope Formosus as a victim of ecclesial politics and personal grudges, while others prefer to present Pope Stephen VI as a more benevolent figure attempting to correct the mistakes made by his predecessor.

Following the death of Stephen VI, Formosus's body was reinterred in St Peter's Basilica. Further trials of this nature against deceased persons were banned, but Sergius III (904–911) reapproved the decisions against Formosus. Sergius demanded the re-ordination of the bishops consecrated by Formosus, who in turn had conferred orders on many other clerics, causing great confusion. Later, the validity of Formosus's pontificate was re-reinstated. The decision of Sergius with respect to Formosus has subsequently been universally disregarded by the Catholic Church, since Formosus's condemnation had little to do with piety and more to do with politics.

=== Primary source account – Liudprand of Cremona ===
Few primary sources document the Cadaver Synod. The most well-known account comes from Liudprand of Cremona (c. 920-972), a historian, diplomat, and later Bishop of Cremona. His book, Antapodosis (Retribution) offers a secondhand account of the events, written roughly 60 years after the synod took place. Composed for the records of Bishop Recemundus of Elvira, Liudprand included Formosus and his posthumous trial as part of a wider analysis on late-Carolingian era Italy.

Liudprand wrote Antapodosis during a period of exile from the court of King Berengar II of Italy. As Berengar held very loose familial connection to the Carolingian dynasty, his legitimacy relied on a perception of longstanding social stability. Liudprand sought to ruin this perception and discredit his rival. His work connected the desecration of Formosus’ body to a corrupt and chaotic church protected by Berengar’s predecessors. As a result, historians recognize that the coverage of the Cadaver Synod in Antapodosis likely contains added details that exaggerate the savagery of the event; however, the account remains a leading piece of scholarship for interpreting the trial due to the rarity of viable alternatives.

Catholic Church titles
Preceded by Stephen V	Pope; 891–896	Succeeded by Boniface VI
