= Papal name =

Regnal name taken by a pope

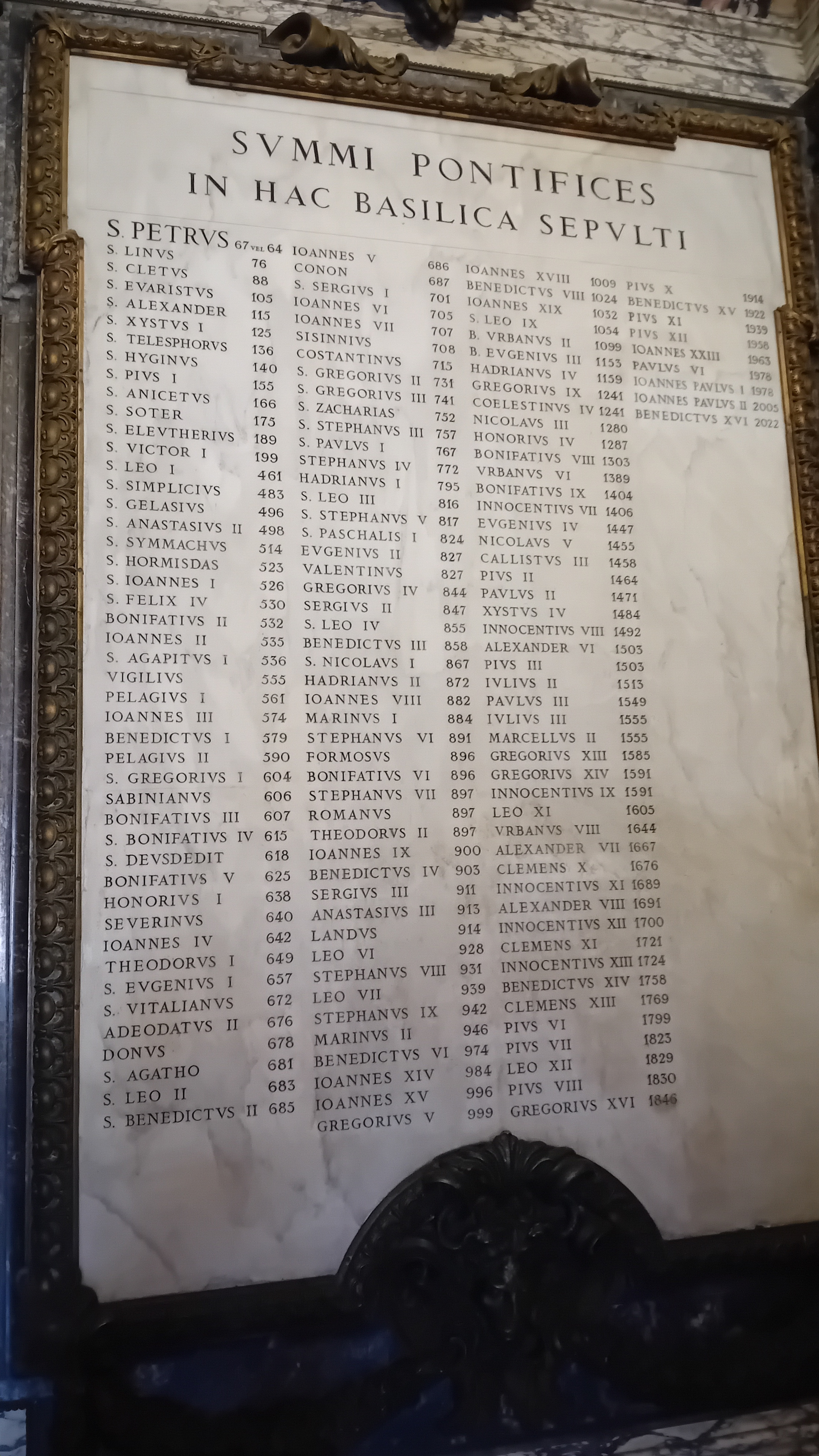
A list of popes buried in St. Peter's Basilica in the Vatican as of 2024

A papal name or pontifical name is the regnal name taken by a pope. Both the head of the Catholic Church, usually known as the pope, and the pope of the Coptic Orthodox Church of Alexandria choose papal names. As of 8 May 2025, Leo XIV is the Catholic pope, and Tawadros II is the Coptic pope. This article discusses and lists the names of Catholic popes; another article has a list of Coptic Orthodox popes of Alexandria.

While popes in the early centuries retained their birth names after their accession to the papacy, later popes began to adopt a new name upon their accession. This began in the sixth century, with Pope John II, and became customary in the tenth century. Every pope since Paul IV in 1555 has taken a papal name.

The pontifical name is given in Latin by virtue of the pope's status as bishop of Rome and head of the Catholic Church. The pope is also given an Italian name by virtue of his Vatican citizenship and because of his position as primate of Italy. However, it is customary when referring to popes to translate the regnal name into all local languages. Thus, for example, the current Catholic pope is Pope Leo in his native English as well as in Latin, Papa Leone in Italian, Papa León in Spanish, Pape Léon in French, and so on.

== Title and honorifics ==
=== Catholic ===
The official style of the Catholic pope in English is "His Holiness Pope [papal name]". "Holy Father" is another honorific often used for popes.

The full title, rarely used, of the Catholic pope in English is: "His Holiness [papal name], Bishop of Rome, Vicar of Jesus Christ, Successor of the Prince of the Apostles, Supreme Pontiff of the Universal Church, Patriarch of the West, Primate of Italy, Archbishop and Metropolitan of the Roman Province, Sovereign of the Vatican City State, Servant of the servants of God".

=== Coptic ===
The official title of the leader of the Coptic Orthodox Church of Alexandria is "Pope of Alexandria and Patriarch of all Africa on the Holy See of St. Mark the Apostle, the Successor of St. Mark the Evangelist, Holy Apostle and Martyr, on the Holy Apostolic Throne of the Great City of Alexandria".

Within the Coptic Church, he is considered to be Father of Fathers, Shepherd of Shepherds, and Hierarch of all Hierarchs. Honorary titles attributed to the Hierarch of the Alexandrine Throne also include:

- The Pillar and Defender of the Holy, Catholic, Apostolic Church and of the Orthodox Faith
- The Dean of the Great Catechetical School of Theology of Alexandria
- The Ecumenical (Universal) Judge (Arbitrator) of the Holy Apostolic and Catholic (Universal) Church
- The Thirteenth among the Holy Apostles

== History ==
During the first centuries of the church, the bishops of Rome continued to use their baptismal names after their elections. The custom of choosing a new name began in AD 533: Mercurius deemed it inappropriate for a pope to be named after the pagan Roman god Mercury, and adopted the name John II in honor of his predecessor John I, who was venerated as a martyr. In the tenth century, clerics from beyond the Alps, especially Germany and France, acceded to the papacy and replaced their foreign-sounding names with more traditional ones.

The last pope to use his baptismal name was Marcellus II in 1555, a choice that was even then quite exceptional. Names are freely chosen by popes, and not based on any system. Names of immediate or distant predecessors, mentors, saints, or even family members — as was the case with John XXIII — have been adopted.

In 1978, Cardinal Albino Luciani became the first pope to take a double name, John Paul I, to honor his two immediate predecessors, John XXIII and Paul VI. John Paul I was also the first pope since Lando in 913 to adopt a papal name that had not previously been used. In 2013, a new name was introduced: Cardinal Jorge Mario Bergoglio selected the name Francis in honour of Saint Francis of Assisi.

== Symbolism ==
In the past, some popes used their birth names; others chose names for various reasons, including the name of the pope who had elevated them to cardinal. From the mid-20th century it became customary to choose a name signaling the aim of their papacy.

The new pontiff's choice of name is now often seen as a signal to the world of whom the new pope will emulate and what policies he will seek to enact. Such was the case with Benedict XVI — it was speculated that he chose the name because he wished to emulate Benedict XV. The same case was for the incumbent Pope Leo XIV, whose reference was Pope Leo XIII and his encyclical Rerum Novarum, recognizing the need for awareness on the new industrial revolution and development of artificial intelligence.

Saint Peter was the first pope; no bishop of Rome has chosen the name Peter II, perhaps out of respect, although there is no prohibition against doing so. Since the 1970s some antipopes, with only a minuscule following, took the name Pope Peter II.

Probably because of the controversial 15th-century antipope known as John XXIII, this name was avoided for over 500 years until the election in 1958 of Cardinal Angelo Roncalli. Immediately upon taking the name of John, it was not known if he would be John XXIII or XXIV; he decided on John XXIII. The number used by an antipope is ignored unless the name has since been used by a legitimate pope; for instance, Benedict X was only deemed to have been an antipope centuries after his death, after the legitimate papacy of Nicola Boccasini as Benedict XI.

== Current practice ==
Immediately after a new pope is elected, and accepts the election, he is asked in Latin "By what name shall you be called?" (Note: Unless impeded, the dean of the College of Cardinals asks the newly elected pope if he accepts his election and what name he will use. In 2005, Cardinal Joseph Ratzinger, the dean, was himself elected pope, so these questions were asked by the subdean, Cardinal Angelo Sodano.) The new pope chooses the name by which he will be known from that point on. The senior cardinal deacon or cardinal protodeacon then appears on the balcony of Saint Peter's to proclaim the new pope by his birth name, and announce his papal name:

Annuntio vobis gaudium magnum:
Habemus Papam!
Eminentissimum ac reverendissimum dominum,
dominum [baptismal name],
Sanctæ Romanæ Ecclesiæ Cardinalem [surname],
qui sibi nomen imposuit [papal name].

I announce to you a great joy:
We have a Pope!
The Most Eminent and Most Reverend Lord,
Lord [baptismal name],
Cardinal of the Holy Roman Church [surname],
who takes to himself the name [papal name].

== Papal names ==
As of 2025, there have been 81 different papal names. 44 of them have been used only once, of which 43 were during the first millennium of the papacy. The most frequently used papal name is John, with 21 popes having taken this name.

Six papal names — John, Benedict, Boniface, Alexander, Felix, and Martin — have numbering discrepancies, due to record-keeping errors or disputes over whether a particular reigning pontiff was valid.

Current pope

Rank	Name	#	Popes	Last time used	Notes
1	John	21	I · II · III · IV · V · VI · VII · VIII · IX · X · XI · XII · XIII · XIV · XV · XVII · XVIII · XIX · XXI · XXII · XXIII	1963	(Note: See Pope John numbering for further information.)
2	Gregory	16	I · II · III · IV · V · VI · VII · VIII · IX · X · XI · XII · XIII · XIV · XV · XVI	1846	
3	Benedict	15	I · II · III · IV · V · VI · VII · VIII · IX · XI · XII · XIII · XIV · XV · XVI	2013	(Note: The papacy of Benedict X was later declared illegitimate.)
4	Clement	14	I · II · III · IV · V · VI · VII · VIII · IX · X · XI · XII · XIII · XIV	1774	
4	Leo	14	I · II · III · IV · V · VI · VII · VIII · IX · X · XI · XII · XIII · XIV	current	
6	Innocent	13	I · II · III · IV · V · VI · VII · VIII · IX · X · XI · XII · XIII	1724	
7	Pius	12	I · II · III · IV · V · VI · VII · VIII · IX · X · XI · XII	1958	
8	Stephen	9	I · II · III · IV · V · VI · VII · VIII · IX	1058	(Note: Additionally, some sources prior to the 1960s list Pope-elect Stephen, who died before his consecration, as Stephen II, thus causing a numbering discrepancy.)
9	Boniface	8	I · II · III · IV · V · VI · VIII · IX	1404	(Note: The papacy of Boniface VII was later declared illegitimate.)
9	Urban	8	I · II · III · IV · V · VI · VII · VIII	1644	
11	Alexander	7	I · II · III · IV · VI · VII · VIII	1691	(Note: The papacy of Alexander V was later declared illegitimate.)
12	Adrian	6	I · II · III · IV · V · VI	1523	
12	Paul	6	I · II · III · IV · V · VI	1978	
14	Celestine	5	I · II · III · IV · V	1296	
14	Nicholas	5	I · II · III · IV · V	1455	
14	Sixtus	5	I · II · III · IV · V	1590	
17	Anastasius	4	I · II · III · IV	1154	
17	Eugene	4	I · II · III · IV	1447	
17	Honorius	4	I · II · III · IV	1287	
17	Sergius	4	I · II · III · IV	1012	
21	Callixtus	3	I · II · III	1458	
21	Felix	3	I · III · IV	530	(Note: The papacy of Felix II was later declared illegitimate.)
21	Julius	3	I · II · III	1555	
21	Lucius	3	I · II · III	1185	
21	Martin	3	I · IV · V	1431	(Note: No popes or antipopes ever used the names Martin II or Martin III. Marinus I and Marinus II were mistakenly thought to be named "Martin(us)", causing confusion.)
21	Sylvester	3	I · II · III	1063	
21	Victor	3	I · II · III	1087	
28	Adeodatus	2	I · II	676	
28	Agapetus	2	I · II	955	
28	Damasus	2	I · II	1048	
28	Gelasius	2	I · II	1119	
28	John Paul	2	I · II	2005	
28	Marcellus	2	I · II	1555	
28	Marinus	2	I · II	946	
28	Paschal	2	I · II	1118	
28	Pelagius	2	I · II	590	
28	Theodore	2	I · II	897	
38	Agatho	1		681	
38	Anacletus	1		92	
38	Anicetus	1		168	
38	Anterus	1		236	
38	Caius	1		296	
38	Conon	1		687	
38	Constantine	1		715	
38	Cornelius	1		253	
38	Dionysius	1		268	
38	Donus	1		678	
38	Eleutherius	1		189	
38	Eusebius	1		308/310	
38	Eutychian	1		283	
38	Evaristus	1		107/108	
38	Fabian	1		250	
38	Formosus	1		896	
38	Francis	1		2025	
38	Hilarius	1		468	
38	Hormisdas	1		523	
38	Hyginus	1		142	
38	Lando	1		914	
38	Liberius	1		366	
38	Linus	1		80	
38	Marcellinus	1		304	
38	Mark	1		336	
38	Miltiades	1		314	
38	Peter	1		68	
38	Pontian	1		235	
38	Romanus	1		897	
38	Sabinian	1		606	
38	Severinus	1		640	
38	Silverius	1		537	
38	Simplicius	1		483	
38	Siricius	1		399	
38	Sisinnius	1		708	
38	Soter	1		174	
38	Symmachus	1		514	
38	Telesphorus	1		137	
38	Valentine	1		827	
38	Vigilius	1		555	
38	Vitalian	1		672	
38	Zachary	1		752	
38	Zephyrinus	1		217	
38	Zosimus	1		418	
