= 824 =

Calendar year

824 in various calendars
- Gregorian calendar: 824; DCCCXXIV
- Ab urbe condita: 1577
- Armenian calendar: 273; ԹՎ ՄՀԳ
- Assyrian calendar: 5574
- Balinese saka calendar: 745–746
- Bengali calendar: 230–231
- Berber calendar: 1774
- Buddhist calendar: 1368
- Burmese calendar: 186
- Byzantine calendar: 6332–6333
- Chinese calendar: 癸卯年 (Water Rabbit); 3521 or 3314 — to — 甲辰年 (Wood Dragon); 3522 or 3315
- Coptic calendar: 540–541
- Discordian calendar: 1990
- Ethiopian calendar: 816–817
- Hebrew calendar: 4584–4585
- Hindu calendars
- Vikram Samvat: 880–881
- Shaka Samvat: 745–746
- Kali Yuga: 3924–3925
- Holocene calendar: 10824
- Iranian calendar: 202–203
- Islamic calendar: 208–209
- Japanese calendar: Kōnin 15 / Tenchō 1 (天長元年)
- Javanese calendar: 720–721
- Julian calendar: 824; DCCCXXIV
- Korean calendar: 3157
- Minguo calendar: 1088 before ROC 民前1088年
- Nanakshahi calendar: −644
- Seleucid era: 1135/1136 AG
- Thai solar calendar: 1366–1367
- Tibetan calendar: ཆུ་མོ་ཡོས་ལོ་ (female Water-Hare); 950 or 569 or −203 — to — ཤིང་ཕོ་འབྲུག་ལོ་ (male Wood-Dragon); 951 or 570 or −202

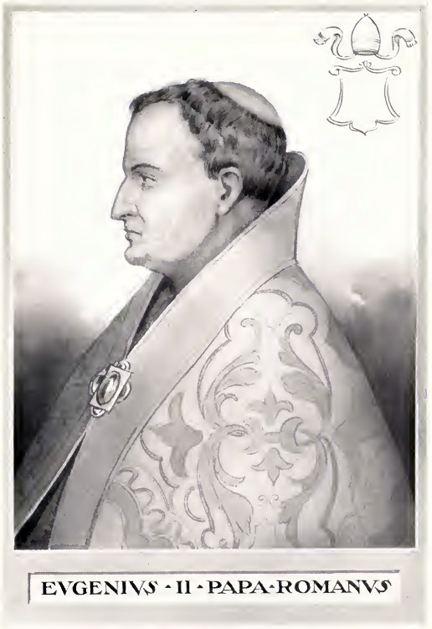
Pope Eugene II (824–827)

Year 824 (DCCCXXIV) was a leap year starting on Friday of the Julian calendar.

== Events ==
=== By date ===
- February 8 – The Tenchō era begins in Japan at the beginning of the reign of the Emperor Junna, bringing an end to the Kōnin era after 15 years.
- February 11 – Pope Paschal I, leader of the Roman Catholic Church and ruler of the Papal States, dies after a reign of seven years. The Roman Curia refuses to bury him in St. Peter's Basilica because of his harsh treatment of the people of Rome, and inters him instead in the Basilica of Santa Prassede. The office remains vacant for four months before a new conclave is assembled.
- February 29 – Prince Li Zhan, 14 years old, is enthroned as the Emperor Jingzong of China, four days after the death of his father, Emperor Muzong.
- February – A major earthquake strikes Byzantium in Asia Minor (now part of western Turkey) and part of Greece, damaging the city walls of Theodosiopolis (now Barbaros in Turkey) and Heraclea Perinthus at the same time that the forces of Byzantine Emperor Michael II the Amorian are suppressing the rebellion by Thomas the Slav. Both cities surrender after the natural event.
- March 3 – (9.19.13.15.19) (9th B'ak'tun, 19th K'atun, 13th year (Tun) 15th month (Winal) 19th day (K'in)) Juun Tsak-Took becomes the new ruler of the Mayan city state of Machaquila (in what is now Guatemala), along with co-ruler and Ti-Chaak become the after the death of Sihyaj K'in Ich’aak II. Juun Tsak-Tookwill until his 840.
- March 5 – Adelard becomes the new Duke of Spoleto upon the death of his father, Suppo I, who ruled much of Italy including Brescia, Parma, Piacenza, Modena, and Bergamo. Adelard reigns for only five months before dying in August.
- May – In Constantinople and throughout the Byzantine Empire, Michael II celebrates the festival of Triumph to mark his return to the capital after defeating the rebellion of Thomas the Slav
- June 4 – Pope Eugene II is selected by church leaders and the local nobility of the Papal States as the 99th Pontiff of the Roman Catholic Church, succeeding Pope Paschal I, receiving a majority after the more conservative Zinzinnus is rejected.
- September – Rebellious Arab troops in North Africa, led by Mansur ibn Nasr al-Tunbudhi in a battle against the Aghlabids, led by the Emir Ziyadat Allah, invade and occupy the city of Tunis.
- November 11 – The Constitutio Romana, drawn up between King Lothair I of Italy, Louis the Pious, since 817, and Pope Eugene II, establishes the authority of the Holy Roman Emperors over the papacy of Rome.

=== By place ===
==== Europe ====
- Battle of Roncevaux Pass: The Basques and Banu Qasi defeat a Frankish expedition, led by Counts Aznar and Ebles, in the Pyrenees.
- Iñigo Arista revolts against the Frankish Empire, and establishes the Kingdom of Pamplona, with the support of the Caliphate of Córdoba.
- Vikings raid Ireland, on the Kingdom of Munster at Skellig Michael

==== Britain ====
- Vikings raid Bangor (modern Wales) for the second time, and plunder the bishopric (approximate date).

==== Japan ====
- Zenpuku-ji, one of the oldest Tokyo temples, is founded by the Japanese Buddhist monk Kūkai.

=== By topic ===
==== Religion ====
- February 11 – Pope Paschal I dies after a 7-year reign, and is succeeded by Eugene II, as the 99th pope of the Catholic Church.

== Births ==
- Al-Tirmidhi, Persian scholar and hadith compiler (d. 892)
- Chen Tao, Chinese poet (d. 882)
- Ibn Majah, Persian scholar and hadith compiler
- Li Pu, prince of the Tang dynasty (d. 828)
- Muhammad ibn Abdallah, Muslim governor (or 825)
- Zhao Chou, Chinese warlord (d. 889)

== Deaths ==
- February 11 – Paschal I, pope of the Catholic Church
- March 5 – Suppo I, Frankish nobleman
- August 5 – Heizei, emperor of Japan (b. 773)
- Adelard, duke of Spoleto (Italy)
- Han Yu, Chinese philosopher and poet (b. 768)
- Mauring, Frankish nobleman
- Mu Zong, emperor of the Tang dynasty (b. 795)
- Óengus of Tallaght, Irish bishop
- Ruthmael, Irish abbot and bishop
- Sayyida Nafisa, Arab female scholar (b. 762)
- Wetti of Reichenau, German scholar
- Zhang Hongjing, Chinese chancellor (b. 760)
