= Pope Gregory IV =

Head of the Catholic Church from 827 to 844

- Bishop of Rome
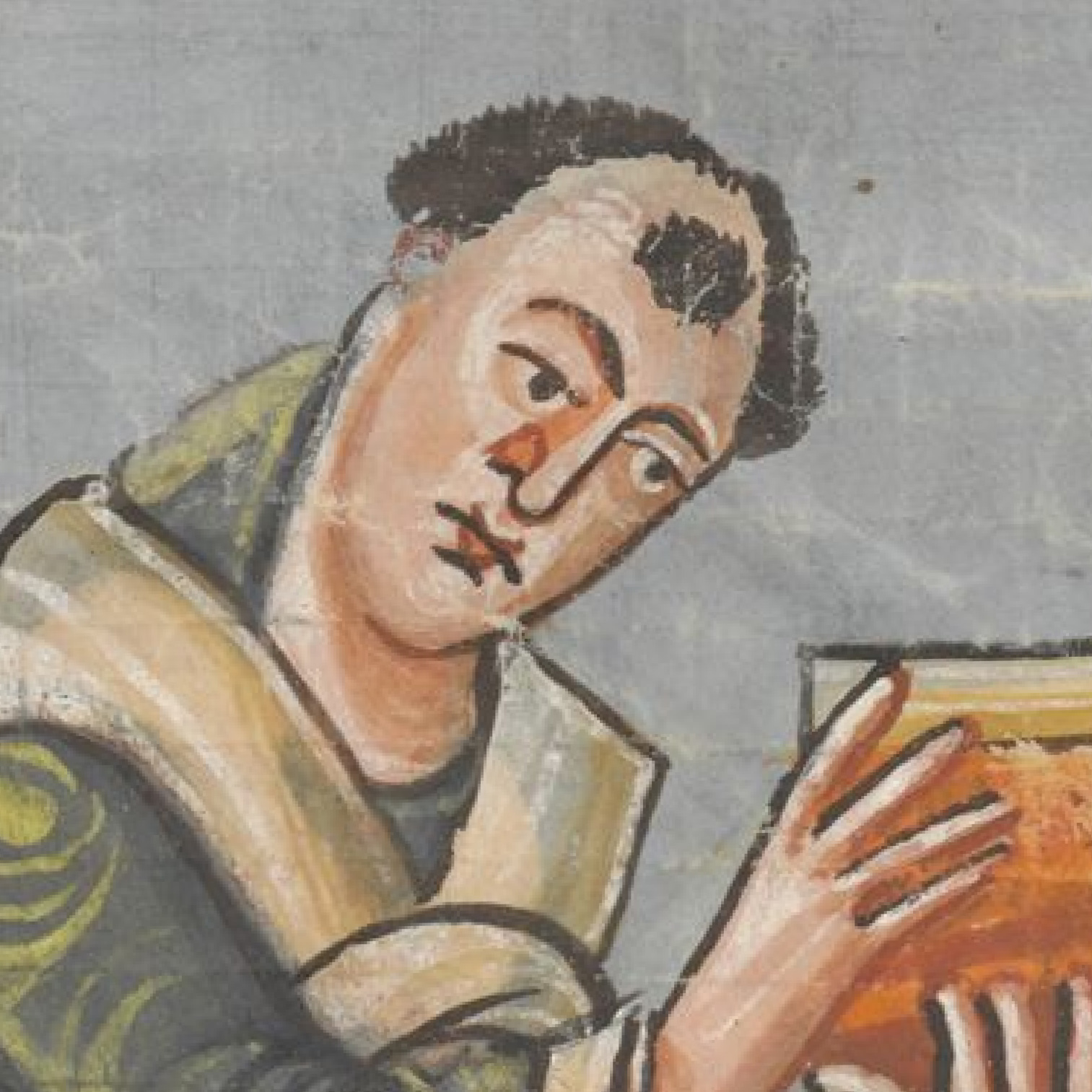
- Miniature of Pope Gregory IV (c. 840)
- Church: Catholic Church
- Papacy began: October 827
- Papacy ended: 25 January 844
- Predecessor: Valentine
- Successor: Sergius II

Orders
- Created cardinal: 797 by Leo III

Personal details
- Born: Before 797 Rome, Papal States
- Died: 25 January 844 Rome, Papal States

Pope Gregory IV (Latin: Gregorius IV; died 25 January 844) was the bishop of Rome and leader of the Papal States from October 827 to his death on 25 January 844. His pontificate was notable for the papacy’s attempts to intervene in the quarrels between Emperor Louis the Pious and his sons. It also saw the breakup of the Carolingian Empire in 843.

== Rise to papacy ==
The son of a Roman patrician called John, Gregory was apparently an energetic but mild churchman, renowned for his learning. Consecrated a priest during the pontificate of Pope Paschal I, at the time of Pope Valentine’s death in 827, Gregory was the cardinal priest of the Basilica of St Mark in Rome. Like his predecessor, Gregory was nominated by the nobility, and the electors unanimously agreed that he was the most worthy to become the bishop of Rome. They found him at the Basilica of Saints Cosmas and Damian where, despite his protestations, he was taken and installed at the Lateran Palace, after which he was enthroned as pope-elect sometime in October 827. Gregory’s elevation to the papal see is believed to represent a continuation of the attempts to control the local political situation in Rome which had begun during Pope Eugene II’s pontificate.

Gregory's consecration was delayed until 29 March 828, when he received notice of the Emperor Louis the Pious’ approval of his election. This delay was enforced by the imperial envoys, who insisted that the Constitution of 824 expressly forbid the consecration of any pope-elect until the emperor had satisfied himself of the validity of the election. It was said that the emperor reprimanded Gregory for attempting to have himself consecrated before receiving the approval of the emperor. Gregory complied with these demands of imperial supremacy, and in 828 and 829, the pope sent embassies to Louis for unspecified discussions.

In January 829, Gregory was involved in a dispute with Farfa Abbey over the ownership of local monastic land by the Roman church. In a court run by a bishop and a representative of the emperor, and in the presence of Gregory, Abbot Ingoald of Farfa claimed that the Frankish emperors had granted them the lands, and that Popes Adrian I and Leo III had taken possession of the land illegally. The imperial representative made a ruling in favour of the abbey, and that the lands were to be restored to the monastery. Although Gregory refused to accept the ruling, there is no evidence that he managed to get the decision overturned.

== Carolingian quarrels ==
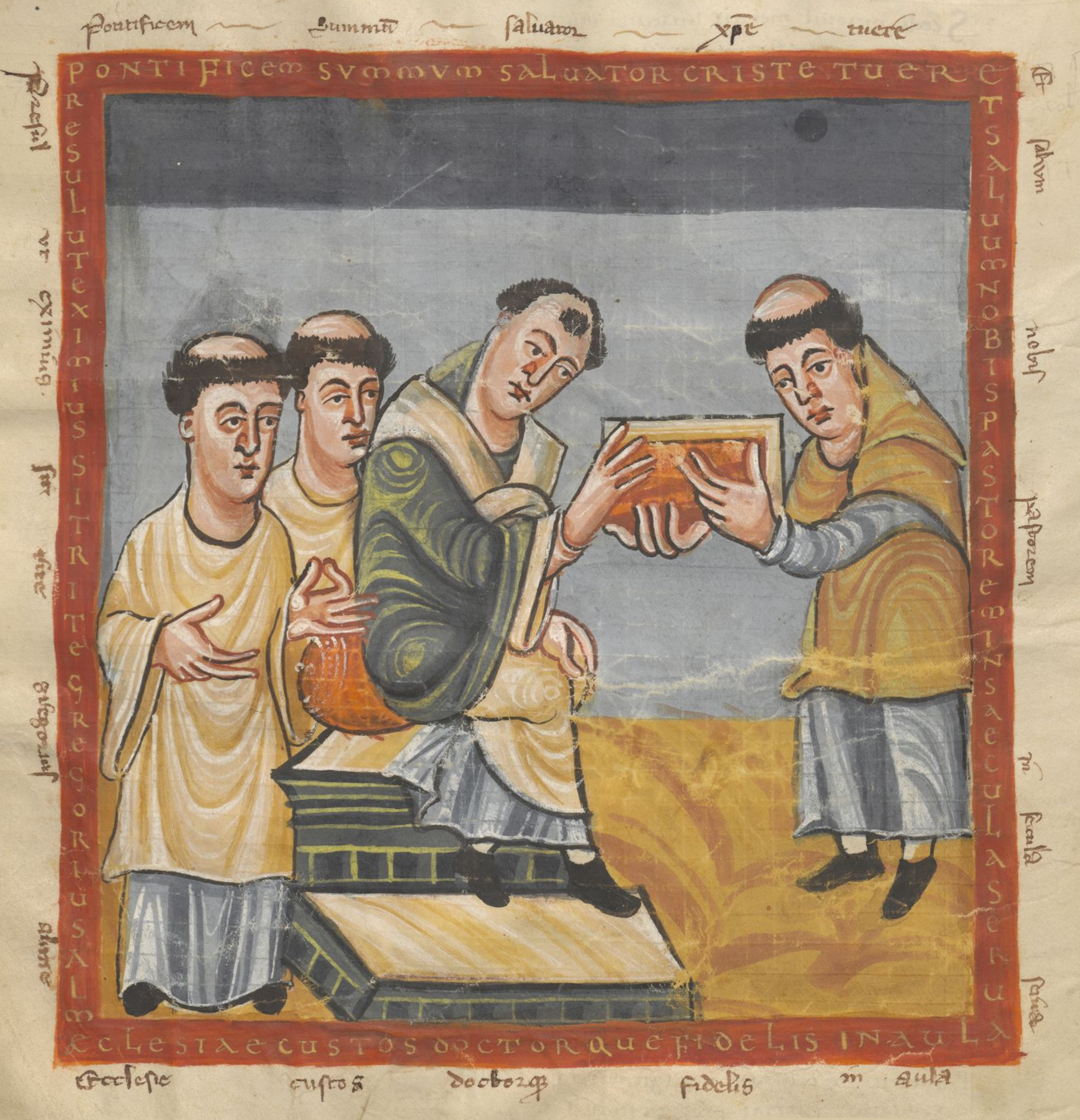
Gregory IV (in the middle) receives a book from Rabanus Maurus (on the right)

In 817, by a solemn deed, confirmed by Paschal I, Louis had made a division of the empire in favour of his three sons from his first marriage: the future emperor Lothair I, Pepin I of Aquitaine, and Louis the German. Over time, papal dependence on the Carolingian emperor was loosened through the quarrels of Louis the Pious and his sons. Louis’ decision to jettison the agreement of 817 regarding the division of the empire by assigning a kingdom to his youngest son, Charles the Bald, in 829 was criticized by Gregory in a letter to the Frankish bishops. The following year (October 830), after a brief rebellion and reconciliation between Louis and his sons, Gregory declared that Louis’ second wife, Judith, was to be released from the convent where she had been forced to take the veil, and to be returned to Louis.

When the war between father and sons resumed in Easter 833, Gregory was approached by Lothair, seeking his intervention to bring about reconciliation between Lothair and his father. He was convinced to leave Rome and travel up to join Lothair, in hopes that his intervention would promote peace, but in practice this action annoyed the Frankish bishops who followed Louis, who believed that Gregory was actively supporting Lothair. Suspicious of Gregory’s intent, they refused to obey the pope, and threatened to excommunicate him, were he to excommunicate them, and even to depose him as pope. Annoyed by their actions, Gregory's response was to insist upon the papal supremacy, the papacy being superior to the emperor. He stated:

”You professed to have felt delighted when you heard of my arrival, thinking that it would have been of great advantage for the emperor and the people; you added that you would have obeyed my summons had not a previous intimation of the emperor prevented you. But you ought to have regarded an order from the Apostolic See as not less weighty than one from the emperor. ...The government of souls, which belongs to bishops, is more important than the imperial, which is only concerned with the temporal. Your assertion that I have only come to blindly excommunicate is shameless, and your offer to give me an honourable reception if I should have come exactly in the way the emperor wanted me to is contemptuous. With regards to the oaths I have taken to the emperor, I will avoid perjury by pointing out to the emperor what he has done against the unity and peace of the Church and his kingdom. With regards to the bishops, in opposing my efforts in behalf of peace, what they threaten has not been done, from the beginning of the Church.”

Regardless of this claim, the vast bulk of the Frankish bishops maintained that the pope had no business interfering in the internal affairs of the kingdom, or in expecting the Frankish clergy to follow his lead in such matters. Their position was clear, that the equality of all the bishops outranked the leadership of the pope.

The armies of Louis and two of his sons met at Rotfeld, near Colmar, on 24 June 833. The sons persuaded Gregory to go to Louis's camp to negotiate, and initially Louis refused to treat Gregory with any honour. However, Gregory managed to convince Louis of his good faith, and returned to Lothair to arrange a peace. However, Gregory soon learned that he had been deceived by Lothair. Gregory was prevented from returning to the emperor, while Louis was deserted by his supporters and was forced to surrender unconditionally; Louis was deposed and humiliated at the Campus Mendacii, and Lothair was proclaimed emperor. Following these events, Gregory returned to Rome. A second fraternal quarrel resulted in Louis being restored in 834, but his position was sufficiently weakened that Lothair retained the Kingdom of Italy.

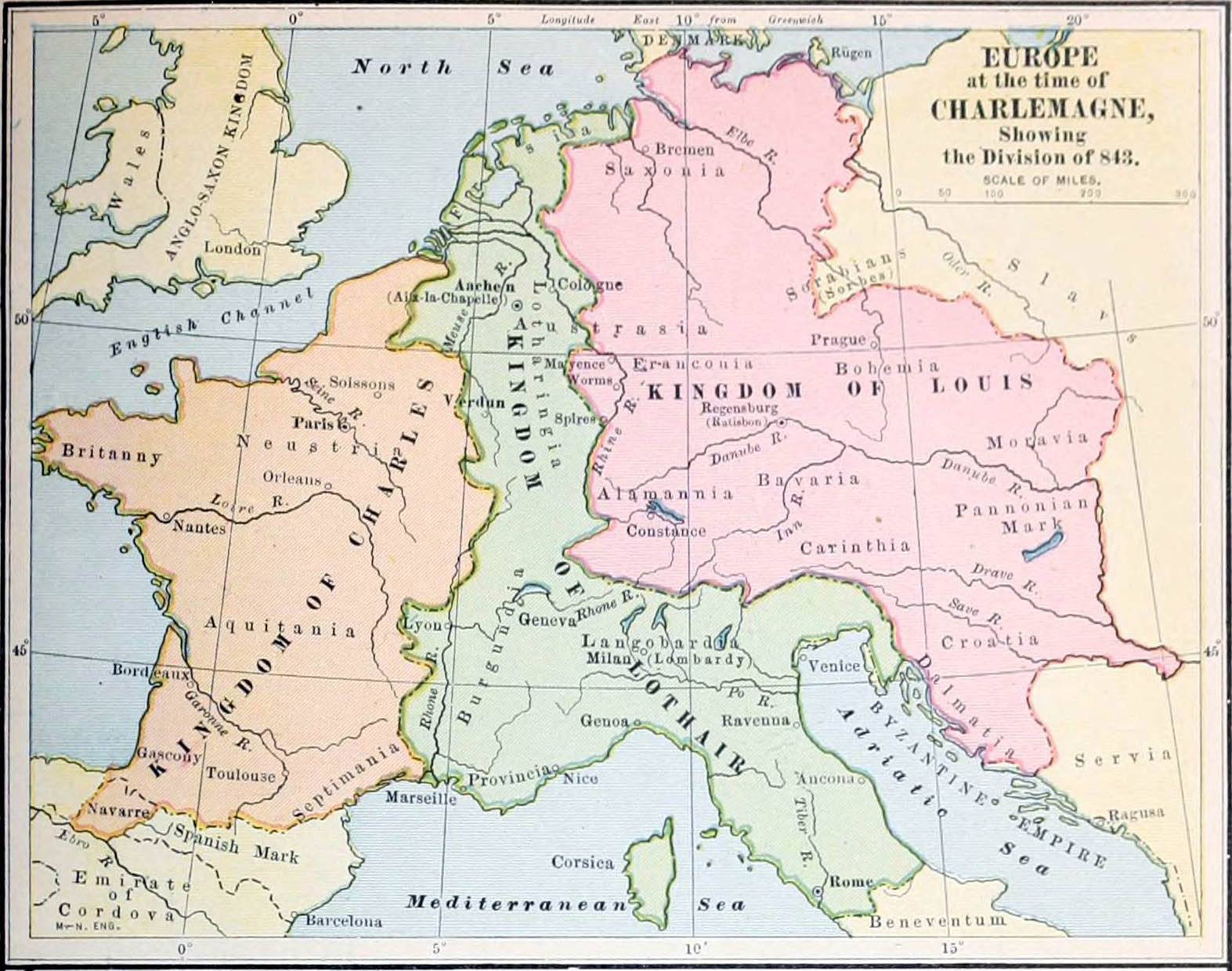
Division of the Carolingian Empire by the Treaty of Verdun

The emperor then sent a delegation to see Gregory, headed by Archbishop Ansgar of Hamburg-Bremen, to question the pope on the events which led to Louis’s removal from the throne by Lothair. Gregory swore an oath that his intentions were honourable, and that he had always sought to achieve a peaceful solution to the conflict between Louis and his sons. Accepting Gregory’s word, the envoys returned to Louis. After this failure in dabbling in imperial politics, Gregory by and large focused his attention for the rest of his pontificate in dealing with internal church matters.

In 836, Lothair, in his role as king of the Lombards, began stripping the possessions of the Roman church. After appealing to Louis, the emperor sent an imperial envoy to investigate the matter. Although Gregory was sick, he managed to advise the envoy of the situation, and asked him to take a letter to the emperor outlining Lothair’s attacks on the Church, which they managed to get past Lothair’s troops at Bologna. Then in 840, with Louis’ death and the accession of Lothair as emperor, war again erupted between the sons of Louis. Gregory made unsuccessful attempts to mediate in the conflict that ensued between the brothers, sending Archbishop George of Ravenna as his representative. According to Prudentius of Troyes, George faithfully tried to achieve his objective, but failed due to Lothair’s refusal to allow George to see Lothair’s brothers. However, according to Andreas Agnellus, George tried to bribe Lothair to make his archbishopric independent of Rome, and was captured at the Battle of Fontenoy. The subsequent Treaty of Verdun in 843 broke up the empire of Charlemagne, with Lothair retaining the imperial title and control of Italy.

== Building activities and religious issues ==
Gregory repaired the Aqua Traiana, which had been damaged during the pontificate of Leo III. Sometime after 841 Gregory rebuilt and fortified parts of the port of Ostia against the attacks of Saracens, renaming it Gregoriopolis. Around the same time he restored the colony of Galeria along the Via Portuensis, while also establishing a new colony, called Draco, along the left bank of the Tiber River, some eleven miles from Rome along the Via Ostiensis. This was the first clear example of land development undertaken by a pope within his own territory.

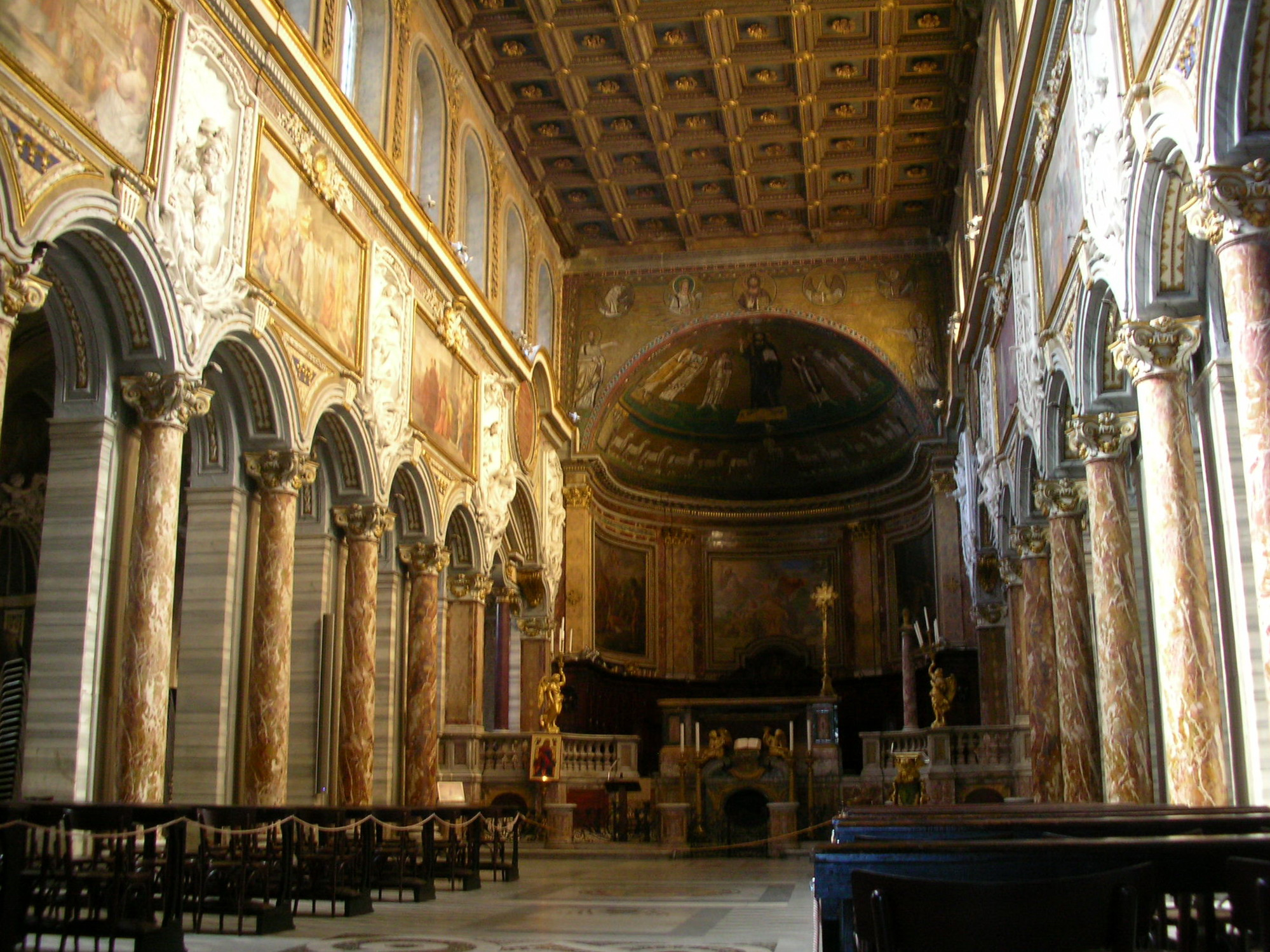
The interior of St Mark’s Basilica in Rome, including the Byzantine mosaics commissioned by Gregory IV

Gregory contributed to the architectural development of Rome. In 833, Gregory completely rebuilt St Mark’s Basilica in Rome, adorning the walls with Byzantine-style mosaics, as well as a number of other churches which he either repaired or rebuilt. He rebuilt the atrium of St. Peter’s Basilica, and within the newly decorated chapel within the basilica he transferred the body of Saint Gregory, and from the Catacombs of Rome, he moved Saint Sebastian, Saint Tiburtius, and Saint Gorgonius. He raised the altar in the church of Santa Maria in Trastevere, and founded a monastery close to the church.

Gregory’s pontificate witnessed the end of the iconoclasm controversy in the Byzantine Empire, while Gregory himself promoted the celebration of the feast of All Saints within the Frankish kingdom on both sides of the Rhine River. Gregory is also known for his appointment of Ansgar as archbishop of Hamburg-Bremen in 832, and as the apostolic legate to the northern and eastern parts of Europe. On 31 March 837 Gregory sent the Pallium to the archbishop of Salzburg; he also sent one to Venerius, the patriarch of Grado, in 828, in support of his claims to have jurisdiction over the bishops of Istria. When a synod awarded jurisdiction to Maxentius, the patriarch of Aquileia, Venerius appealed to Gregory, who supported him. Meanwhile, King Lothair backed Maxentius, who forced the bishops of Istria to obey him, while at the same time ignoring Gregory’s orders to cease. Gregory also supported the candidacy of John IV (bishop of Naples).

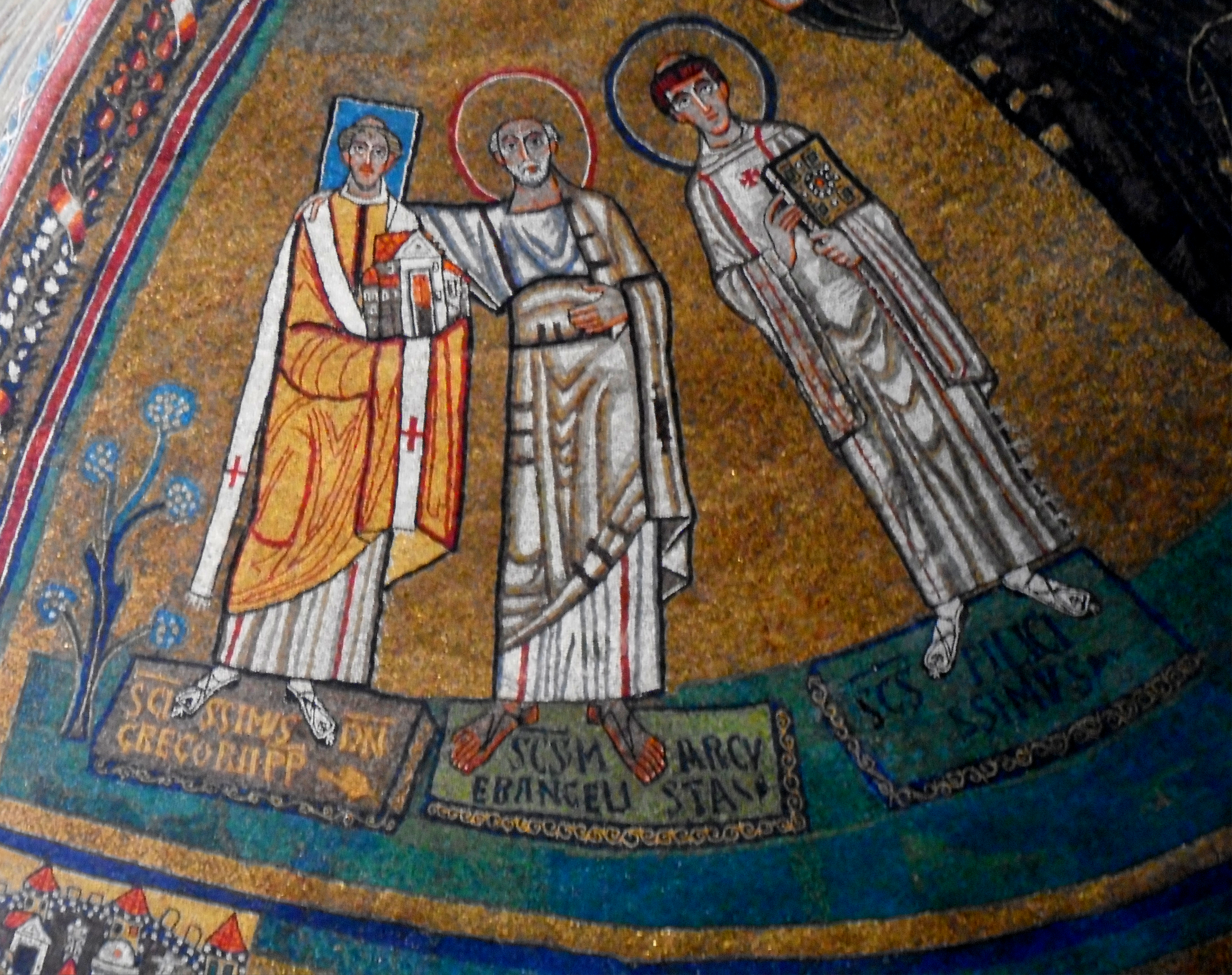
Mosaic of Gregory IV from San Marco Evangelista al Campidoglio, Rome

Gregory was also asked to arbitrate during his journey to Francia in 833 the case against Aldric of Le Mans, who was being forced out of his see by partisans of Lothair. On 8 July 833 Gregory wrote to the bishops of “Gaul, Europe and Germany” declaring that Aldric had every right to appeal to the pope, and that until the pope had issued a judgement one way or the other, no-one could pass a sentence against him. Further, that this mandate had to be obeyed in order to remain in communion with the Roman church. The letter together with the restoration of Louis allowed Aldric to remain in his see for some time.

Gregory was also asked by emperor Louis’s representative, Amalarius of Metz, to provide an antiphonary for use at church services at Metz, to which Gregory was forced to admit that he had none suitable for the emperor, as he had already given a number to Wala of Corbie, which he had already taken to Francia.

On 25 January 844 Gregory IV died, and was buried in St. Peter’s Basilica. He was succeeded by Sergius II.

== Notes ==
Catholic Church titles
Preceded by Valentine	Pope; 827–844	Succeeded by Sergius II
