= Coronation of the Holy Roman Emperor =

Investiture ceremony

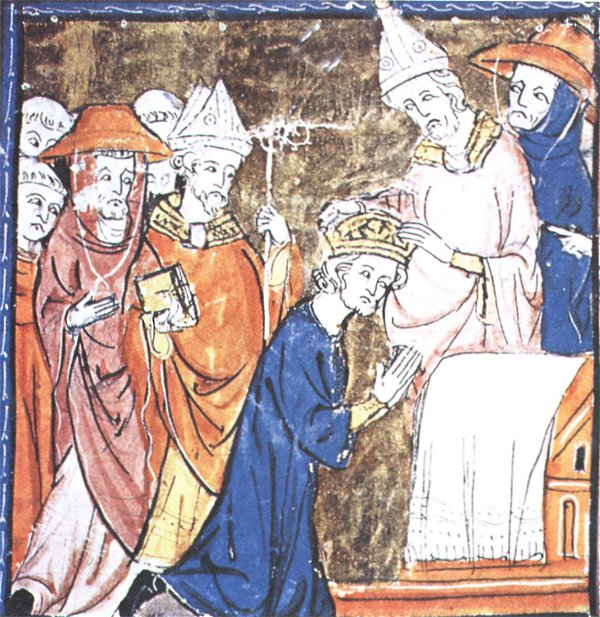
The coronation of Charlemagne by Pope Leo III

The Holy Roman Emperor received the imperial regalia from the hands of the Pope, symbolizing both the pope's right to crown Christian sovereigns and also the emperor's role as protector of the Catholic Church. The Holy Roman Empresses were crowned as well.

The Holy Roman Empire was established in 962 under Otto the Great. Later emperors were crowned by the pope or other Catholic bishops. In 1530 Charles V became the last Holy Roman emperor to be crowned by a pope, Clement VII, albeit in Bologna (Frederick III was the last to be crowned in Rome). Thereafter, until the abolition of the empire in 1806, no further crownings by the pope were held. (Note: See also Guy Stair Sainty, The Holy Roman Empire: Introduction. From the Almanach de la Cour website. Retrieved on 14 September 2008.) Later rulers simply proclaimed themselves Imperator Electus Romanorum ("Elected Emperor of the Romans") after their coronation as German king.

== Preliminaries ==
Before being crowned emperor by the pope, a monarch first had to win the support of the majority of the seven prince-electors in the Imperial election, then to be crowned King of the Romans by an archbishop, for example that of Cologne, Mainz, or Trier. He then had to conduct an Italienzug (Romzug), leading his army from Germany to Rome and occasionally having to fight off enemies barring the way, making his coronation into a military expedition. Some elected or crowned Kings of the Romans never made it that far, and thus were never confirmed as Holy Roman Emperors by the Holy See. The papal coronation was necessary for the Imperial title until 1508, when the Venetians blocked the journey of Maximilian I, and he was instead proclaimed emperor elect by Pope Julius II at Trent. This established the right of elected German monarchs to use the imperial title.

== Ceremonies ==
=== Locations ===
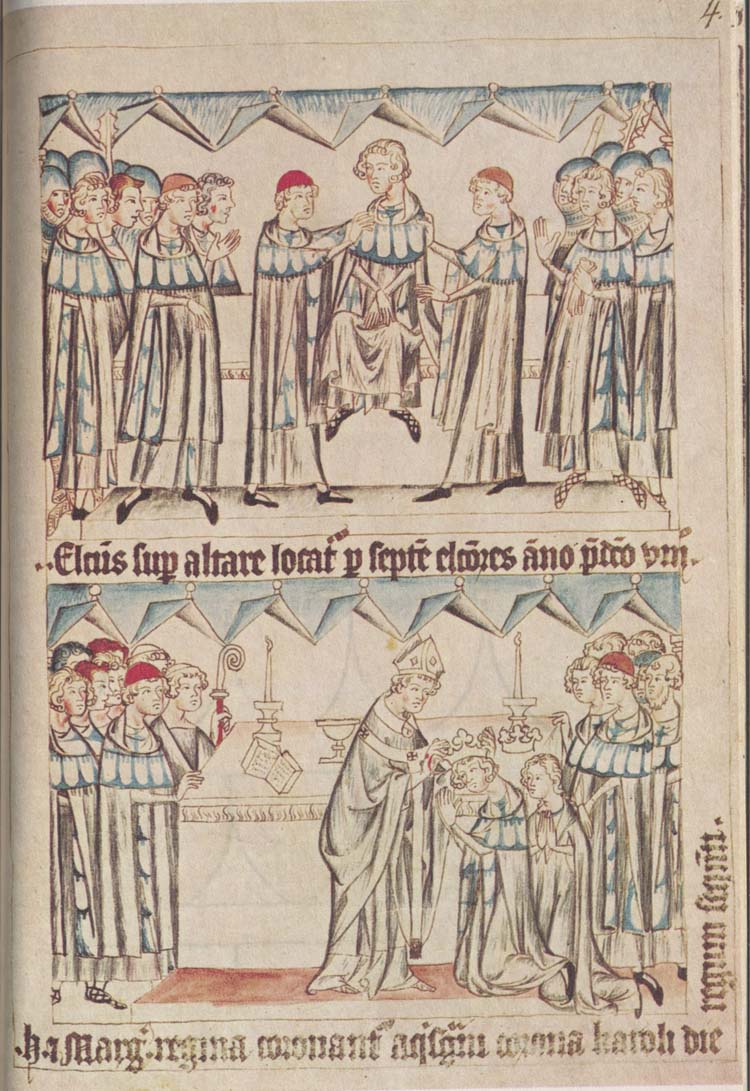
Coronation of Emperor Henry VII

Successors of Charlemagne were crowned in Rome for several centuries, where they received the imperial crown in St. Peter's Basilica from the pope.

The Iron Crown of Lombardy (with the title King of Italy or King of the Lombards) was conferred in the Church of St. Ambrose at Milan or at the cathedral of Monza, (Note: The Encyclopædia Britannica notes that there is no clear record of a coronation with the Iron Crown before that of the Holy Roman Emperor Henry VII in 1312.) that of Burgundy at Arles. The German crown—which came to be the most important of all—was usually given at Aachen. From 1562 until the last German coronation in 1792, the emperors-elect were crowned kings of Germany in Frankfurt Cathedral, which had already in 1356 had become the established site for the imperial elections.

=== German royal coronation ===
The German coronation ceremony first required the electors to meet at Frankfurt, under the presidency of the elector-archbishop of Mainz, who formally summoned the electors and had the right of the last vote. The new emperor-elect was led to the high altar of the cathedral and seated, then conducted to a gallery over the entrance to the choir, where he sat with the electors while his election was proclaimed. The coronation itself took place on a subsequent day.

If the coronation was performed (as usual before 1562) at the Palatine Chapel at Aachen (now Aachen Cathedral), then the archbishop of Cologne, as local metropolitan, was the chief officiant and was assisted by the two other clerical electors, the archbishop of Mainz and the archbishop of Trier. (Note: This account is of the German royal coronation ritual used for Rudolf I in 1273 and remained substantially the same until that of Matthias II at Frankfurt in 1612. The account is found in Woolley (1915), pp. 122–125.) These three archbishop-electors met the emperor-elect at the entrance of the church, where the archbishop of Cologne said the prayer, "Almighty, everlasting God, your servant,..." (Note: The canons of the Palatine Chapel in Aachen would bring the silver-gilt reliquary bust of Charlemagne with them to the entrance for the emperor-elect to venerate as he enter the Palatine Chapel.) The choir sang the antiphon, "Behold, I send my Angel..." (Ecce mitto Angelum meum...) as the emperor-elect and the archbishops filed into the church. The archbishop of Cologne then said the prayers, "God, who knows the human race,..." and "Almighty and everlasting God of heaven and earth,...." The Mass then began with the propers of the Feast of the Epiphany and the collect for the Feast of St. Michael. After the sequence and the Litany of the Saints, the archbishop of Cologne put six questions to the emperor-elect, each time receiving the response "I will": 1. Will he defend the holy faith? 2. Will he defend the holy church? 3. Will he defend the kingdom? 4. Will he maintain the laws of the empire? 5. Will he maintain justice? 6. Will he show due submission to the pope? (Note: "Will you be duly subject and show reverent faith to the Father and Lord most holy in Christ, the Roman pontiff and to the holy Roman church?") The emperor-elect then laid two fingers on the altar and swore his oath. The Recognition then followed, with the emperor-elect asking those assembled to accepted him as their king, three times receiving the response "Let it be done".

The archbishop of Cologne then said the prayers, "Bless, Lord, this king,..." and "Ineffable God,...." (Note: The German rite as also the English has the word 'ineffable', whereas the other European coronation rites has 'inexecutable.') The archbishop then anointed the emperor-elect with the oil of the catechumens on his head, breast and shoulders, saying, "I anoint you king with the oil of sanctification in the name of the Father and of the Son and of the Holy Spirit. Amen." and then on the palms of both hands, saying, "Let these hands be anointed, as kings and prophets were anointed and as Samuel anointed David to be king may you be blessed and established king in this kingdom over this people, whom the Lord, your God, has given you to rule and govern, which he vouchsafes to grant, who with the Father and the Holy Spirit, lives and reigns,...." (Note: A number of other prayers of consecration then follow, which Woolley assumes were intended as alternative prayers, since the king had already been consecrated and anointed.) He was then vested in the imperial robes, including buskins, a long alb, a dalmatic, a stole crossed priest-wise over the breast, gloves, and mantle. (Note: These vestments may be seen at Media related to Coronations of Holy Roman Emperors at Wikimedia Commons. Woolley notes that not only was the king clothed in these robes and invested with the regalia identified as those of Charlemagne, but accounts of the coronation of Leopold II state that the king's coiffure and beard were cut to look like that of "a man of the seventh (sic) century.") The sword was given with the words, "Receive this sword at the hands of us bishops...." The ring was given with the words, "Receive this ring of royal dignity...." The sceptre and orb were given with the words, "Receive this rod of virtue and equity...." Finally the crown was set on his head conjointly by the three archbishop-electors with the words, "Receive this royal crown...." The oath was taken again, this time in the direct form in both Latin and German, "I promise and pledge in the sight of God...." The responsory is chanted, "My soul is longing,..," and the king is enthroned (Note: When the ceremony took place in Aachen, the throne used was Charlemagne's own marble throne directly opposite the high altar.) (Note: Before the coronation proper Saint Stephen's Purse, reliquary containing earth soaked the blood of the first Christian martyr and which had once been in Charlemagne's tomb was placed within the throne.) with the words, "Stand fast and hold firmly...." At the coronation of Charles V the archbishop-elector of Mainz preached a homily at this point.

The coronation of the queen followed and was conducted jointly by the archbishop-electors of Mainz and Trier. The Te Deum was then sung during which Charles V dubbed a number of knights with the imperial sword, although at subsequent coronations this took place after the Coronation proper. The Mass was then concluded, during which the king communed in one kind. Whenever the coronations were performed at Aachen, the new king was made a canon of the church at its conclusion.

From 1562 to 1792 the German coronation took place before the Altar of St. Bartholomew in the crossing of the Frankfurt Cathedral.

=== Roman imperial coronation ===
The Holy Roman imperial coronation in Rome evolved over the thousand years of the empire's existence from an originally very simple ritual (which by its very simplicity paralleled and most clearly demonstrated its origins in its Byzantine counterpart) to one of increasing complexity. The oldest manuscript of the Roman imperial coronation ritual is found in the 9th century Gemunden Codex and while it is uncertain for whom (if anyone) the ritual described in it was intended to be used in it we come the closest to seeing the very types of forms which would have been used for Charlemagne himself. The ritual began with a short prayer for the emperor, "Hear our prayer, Lord, and those of your servant...". This was immediately followed by the prayer, "Look, Almighty God, with a serene gaze on this, your glorious servant,...", in which a golden crown was placed on the emperor's head during the words of the concluding phrase of this prayer, "Through whom honor and glory are yours through infinite ages of ages. Amen." A sword was then given to the emperor with the word, "Receive this sword by the hands of bishops, who, though unworthy, are consecrated to be in the place and authority of the holy Apostles, deliver it to you, with our blessing, to serve for the defense of the holy Church, divinely ordained, and remember of whom the Psalmist prophesied, saying, 'Gird the sword upon your thigh, O most Powerful One, that with it you may exercise equity.'", a form which would have a long history both in the imperial coronation ritual and in those of numerous European royal coronation rituals as well. The Laudes Imperiale (a series of formal acclamations that originated in Roman times—see below) were then chanted. The ceremony traditionally took place in Saint Peter's basilica.

==== Coronation of Frederick I Barbarossa ====
In its more developed form during the High Middle Ages, before the coronation proper the emperor (Note: The emperor is attended by German archbishops or bishops, as the British monarch is similarly attended by the Anglican bishops of Durham and of Baths and Wells.) went in procession first to the Church of St. Mary in Turri, (Note: A church which formed part of the complex of buildings around the east atrium of the Old St. Peter's.) where he took an oath to protect the Roman Church, "In the name of Christ, I, Frederick, the emperor, promise, pledge and guarantee in the sight of God and the blessed Apostle Peter that I will be the protector and defender of this holy Roman Church in all ways useful to her, however many, in so far as I am supported by divine assistance according to my knowledge and ability." The imperial party then proceeded to the Basilica of St. Peter. The emperor was met at the silver door of St. Peter's by the cardinal bishop of Albano, who said the prayer, "God in whose hands are the hearts of kings...". He then entered the church, where the cardinal bishop of Porto said the prayer, "Inscrutable God, Author of the world...." The emperor then went up into the choir and the Litany of the Saints, then sang while the emperor lay prostrate before the Altar of St. Peter. The emperor then went to the Altar of St. Maurice, the patron saint of the Empire, where the cardinal bishop of Ostia anointed him on his right forearm and on the nape of his neck with the Oil of the Catechumens as he said the prayer, "Lord God with whom is all power, ..." or "God the Son of God,..." (Note: The Ordo of Waitz which is contemporary with this one used for Frederick I has the prayer, "God, who is glory of the just and the mercy of sinner,..." with the anointing taking place at the words, "Kindle, Lord, we ask you, his heart with the love of your grace through this anointing with oil as you have anointed priests, kings and prophets,..." After this was said the prayer, "Lord God with whom is all power,..") (Note: The anointing with the Oil of the Catechumens by the senior cardinal before a side altar and between the shoulders and right arm may have been intended to stress the fact that a coronation was not a sacramental act, unlike the consecration of a bishop which included an anointing with Chrism before the high altar on the top of the head.) (Note: The text of this formula can be found in Coronation of the Hungarian monarch.) Following this, the emperor proceeded to the Altar of St. Peter, where the pope handed him a sword with the words, "Receive the imperial sword for vindication over evil..." and then kissed him. The pope then girded the emperor with the sword saying, "Receive the sword upon your thigh..." and kissed him again. The emperor brandished the sword and returned it to its sheath. The pope next handed the sceptre to the emperor with the words, "Receive the royal sceptre, the rod of virtue..." and lastly crowned him with the words, "Receive the sign of glory..." and kissed the emperor a third time. The Germans present then chanted the Laudes Imperiale in German and Mass was celebrated.

==== Coronation of Henry VI and Constantia ====
In the coronation of Henry VI and Constantia we see the Roman imperial ritual in substantially its final form; the imperial coronation ritual used for Henry VII in 1312 and that found in the Roman Pontifical of 1520 differ from it only in certain details. The emperor and empress go in procession to St. Mary in Turri, the choir singing, "Behold, I send an angel" (1312--The emperor is received as a brother canon by the canons of the church and dressed in a surplice and an almuce.) The emperor takes the Oath to defend the Roman Church and swears fealty to the pope and his successors and kisses the pope's feet. (Note: In 1312 and in later coronations the emperor no longer swears fealty to the pope.) The pope gives the emperor the Kiss of Peace and the procession sets out for the Basilica of St. Peter, the choir singing, "Blessed be the Lord God of Israel".

At the Silver Door of the Basilica the cardinal bishop of Albano says the prayer, "God in whose hands are the hearts of kings." As the pope enters the Basilica the responsory "Peter, do you love me?" is sung. At the Rota porfiretica (Note: A large circular stab of porphyry set into the floor of both the Old Basilica and the present one upon which many emperors, beginning with Charlemagne, are said to have been crowned.) the pope puts several questions to the emperor about his faith and duty and then he retires to vest for the Mass. The cardinal bishop of Porto says the prayer, "Unerring God, Author of the World." The emperor goes to the Chapel of St. Gregory where he is vested in amice, alb and cincture and is then led to the pope who 'makes him a cleric. The emperor is then vested in tunicle, dalmatic, pluviale, mitre, buskins and sandals. (Note: The emperor had the unique privilege as a layman given him by the pope of wearing pontifical vestments, i.e., the vestments proper to a bishop. Nevertheless, one should also recall that the dress and insignia of both emperors and bishops have a common origin in the dress and insignia of the Roman senators.) The cardinal bishop of Ostia in the meanwhile goes to the Silver Door where the empress is waiting and on meeting her says the prayer, "Almighty, eternal God, fount and source of goodness" and then leads her to the Altar of St. Gregory to await the pope's procession.

The pope proceeds to the confessio of St. Peter and beginning the Mass. After the Kyrie, while the emperor and empress lie prostrate before the confessio, the Archdeacon sings the Litany of the Saints. The emperor and empress then rise and go to the Altar of St. Maurice where the cardinal bishop of Ostia anoints the emperor with the Oil of the Catechumens on his right forearm and on the nape of his neck, while he says the prayers, "The Lord God Almighty, whose omnipotence is" and "God the Son of God." The cardinal bishop of Ostia then says the prayer, "God who alone has immortality" for the empress and then anoints her on the breast with the Oil of the Catechumens while he says, "The grace of the Holy Spirit through my humble ministry descend upon you copiously."

The pope then descends to the Altar of St. Maurice (Note: where the crowns have already been deposited) (and 1312--kisses the emperor 'after the manner of a deacon'). The pope then give the emperor a ring with the words, "Receive this ring the visible witness of holy faith..." and then the short prayer, "God with whom is all power..." (a much shorter version of the prayer said at the anointing). The pope girds the sword on the emperor with the words, "Receive this sword with the blessing of God..." and the prayer, "God whose providence..." and then crowns the emperor with the words, "Receive the Crown of royal excellence..." The pope gives the emperor the scepter with the words, "Receive the Scepter of royal power, the rod of royal rectitude, the staff of virtue,..." and the prayer, "Lord, fount of all honor..."

The pope returns to the Altar of St. Peter and the Gloria in excelsis is sung and the pope says the collect, "God of all kings..." (In the 1312 and later coronations this is said after the collect for the feastday and after these collects the Laudes Imperiale are sung). The Epistle (Note: Ideally read by the King of France, he is present, or by the King of Naples.) and the gradual is sung.

(In the 1312 and later coronations the investitures with the imperial regalia take place after the gradual. The pope sets a miter on the emperor's head with the points 'to the right and to the left' and crowns him with the words, "Receive the sign of glory..." (Note: Cf. the portrait of Frederick III wearing such an imperial crown over a miter.) The sword is then given to the emperor and gird on him, after which he brandishes it thrice. The Orb is placed in the emperor's right hand and the Scepter in his left hand with the words, "Receive the Rod of virtue and truth..." and the emperor is crowned and then kisses the pope's feet. The pope sets a miter on the empress' head 'with the points to the right and to the left' (Note: The only other women who had the right to wear a miter were the 'mitered abbesses', the superiors of certain very ancient monastic communities, although Gregory Dix in his book, The Shape of the Liturgy notes that these abbesses were originally ex officio deaconesses and that these miters were originally the caps worn by deaconesses as an insignia of their deaconal status.) and crowns her with the words, "Solemnly blessed as empress by our unworthy ministry, receive the crown of imperial excellence...")

The Laudes Imperiale are sung and then the Gospel is read by the emperor. At the Offertory the emperor offers bread, candles and gold and the emperor offers the pope the wine and the empress the water for the chalice. (1312--The Emperor serves the pope 'as a subdeacon offering him the chalice and water cruet.) Both the emperor and the empress communicate and in 1312 after Communion the emperor kisses the pope's cheek and the empress kisses the pope's hand. (After 1312 at the end of the Mass the pope if he chooses may say the prayers, "Look, we ask you, Lord, with a serene countenance...", "Bless, Lord, we ask you, this prince...," or "God, Father of eternal glory...").

Upon leaving the basilica, the emperor swore in three places to maintain the rights and privileges of the Roman people.

The Roman imperial coronation ritual had certain unique elements which distinguished it from those of the royal coronation rituals developed in the European royal coronation rituals, e.g., the stational character of the ritual in which individual parts of the ritual took place in different parts of the papal basilica (usually that of St. Peter's in the Vatican) (Note: Note that the prayer said by the cardinal bishops at the entrances of the emperor and empress into the church was later imitated in the French, German, Swedish and Norwegian coronation rituals.) and the imperial coronation is quite unique in not having a solemn enthronement of the monarch (or even any use of a throne at all) in its ritual. Instead of an enthronement ritual we find the chanting of the Laudes Regiae, which paralleled in both form and importance its Byzantine imperial counterpart. Indeed, only those European coronation rituals which were directly modeled on the Roman imperial ritual, i.e., the papal coronation (Note: The Papal Laudes were last chanted during the entrance procession of the Inauguration Mass of Pope Benedict XVI on April 24, 2005.) and the royal coronation ritual in the Roman Pontifical, also include such chanting of a Laudes.

The custom of Holy Roman Emperors going to Rome to be crowned was last observed by Frederick III; in 1452, his great-grandson, Charles V, was crowned by the Pope in Bologna in 1530. After that, only the German coronation ritual was performed.

=== Crowns ===
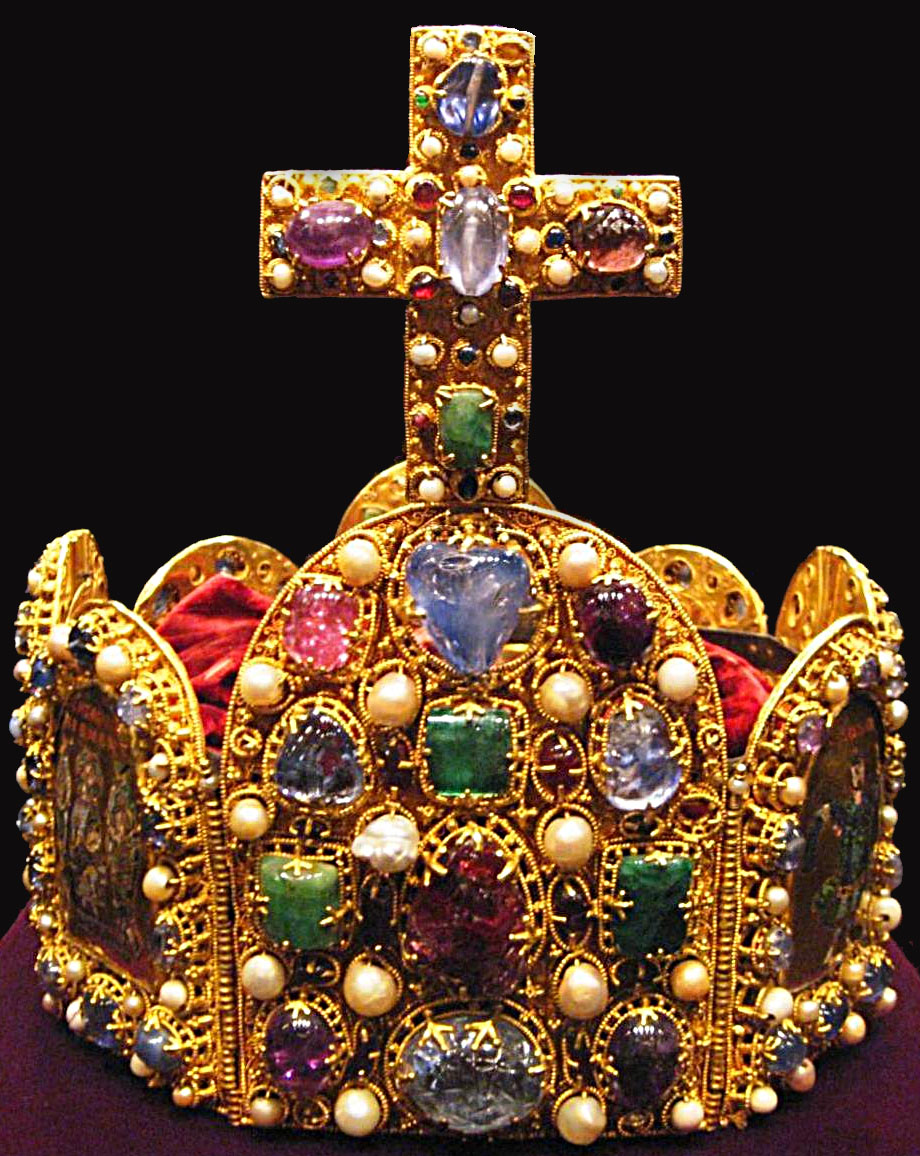
Imperial Crown of the Holy Roman Empire

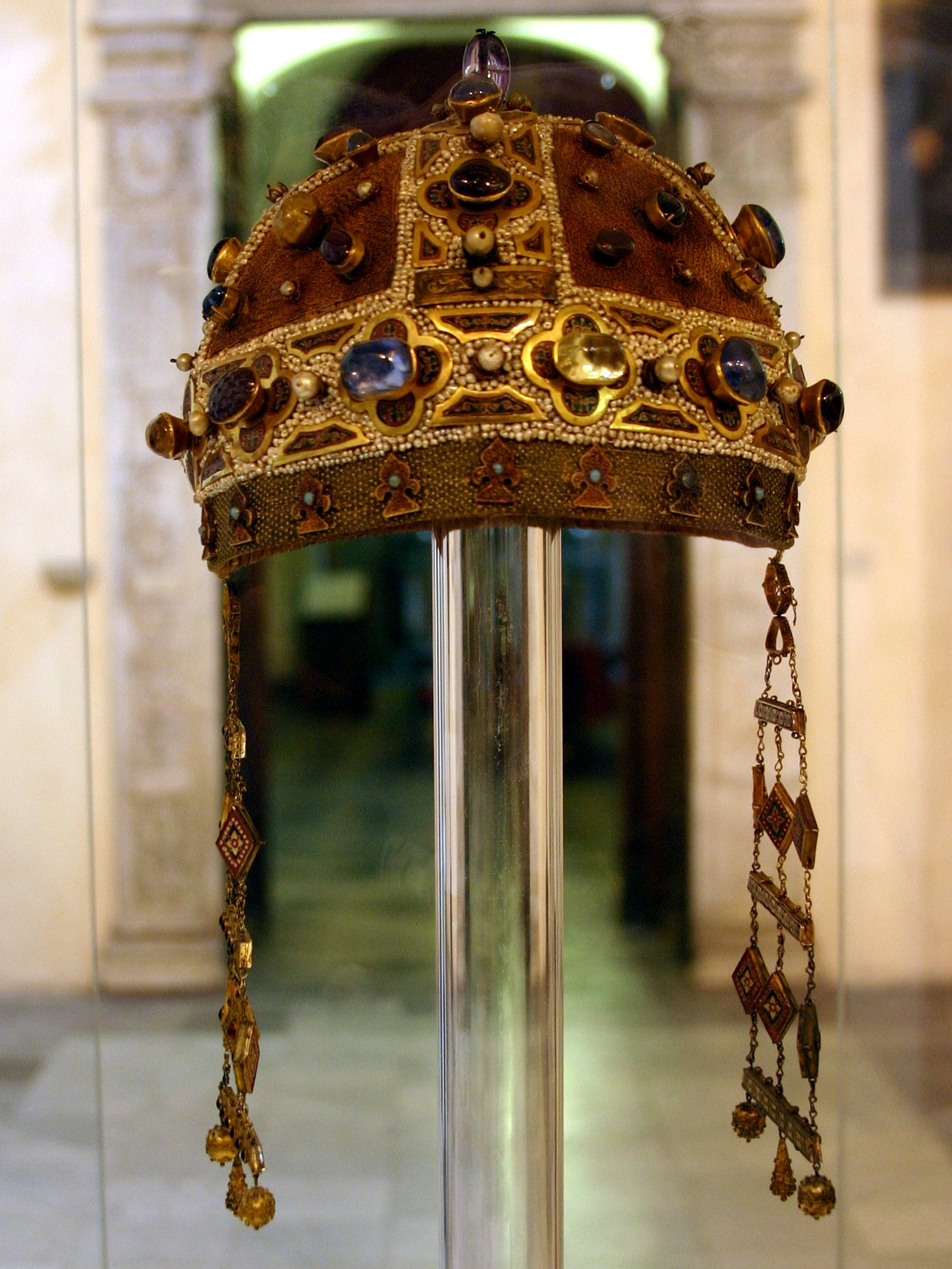
Constance of Aragon's crown.

It is unclear as to which crown was used for either the German royal coronation or the Roman imperial coronation. Lord Twining suggests that when the German royal coronation still took place at Aachen, the silver-gilt crown on the reliquary bust of Charlemagne was used, since the Imperial Crown or Reichskrone is made of gold. This is reinforced by medieval sources that refer to the Iron Crown of Italy, the silver crown of Germany and the gold crown of the Roman Empire. Twining indicates that it is also unclear as to what crown was used for the imperial coronation in Rome, and indicates that the Imperial Crown might have been worn by the emperor-elect for his formal entry into the city of Rome, with another gold crown, perhaps provided by the pope, being used in the actual imperial coronation ritual itself. One of these latter crowns, specifically that used for the imperial coronation of Frederick II, may be the Byzantine style closed crown found in the tomb of his mother, Constance of Sicily, in the Cathedral of Palermo. Apparently, once Frankfurt had become the normal site for the German royal coronation, the Imperial Crown was always used and thus eventually became identified as the Crown of Charlemagne.

The Imperial Crown was originally made for Otto I (probably in the workshops of Reichenau abbey, the single arch of the crown from front to back originally separating the two halves of the now collapsed inner cap like the ribbon which similarly caused the 10th bishops' miters to bulge up on either side. Thus the Imperial Crown is the first example of the miter crown worn as a unique privilege of the Holy Roman emperors and empresses. Later personal crowns of the emperors were worn over miters with points like that of contemporary bishops' miters, (Note: Cf. The portrait of Frederick III.) the miter eventually becoming a part of the crown itself, (Note: Cf. The only extant example is the Austrian Imperial Crown made for Rudolf II.) although in the Baroque period the two halves of the miter took the form of two hemispheres. (Note: The only extant example of such a crown is the Russian Imperial Crown made for Catherine the Great. Peter the Great adopted the contemporary miter crowns worn by the Habsburg emperors as the model for the actual and heraldic crowns of the Russian Empire.)

=== Laudes Imperiale ===
| Cantors: | Response: |
|---|---|
| Hear, O Christ | Life to our Lord, decreed by God, Supreme Pontiff and Universal Father |
| Hear, O Christ | Hear, O Christ |
| Savior of the World | You that are (our) (Note: The actual Latin has no possessive pronoun, but the English translation would make no sense without it.) Help |
| Hear, O Christ | Life to our Lord, that Augustus crowned by God, the great and pacifying emperor |
| Saint Mary | You that are (our) Help |
| Saint Mary | You that are (our) Help |
| Saint Mary | You that are (our) Help |
| Hear, O Christ | And life to the most excellent sons of the King |
| Saint Peter | You that are (our) Help |
| Saint Peter | You that are (our) Help |
| Saint Peter | You that are (our) Help |
| Hear, O Christ | Life and victory to the army of the Franks, Romans and Germans (Note: The actual text has "Teutons".) |
| Saint Theodore | You that are (our) Help |
| Saint Theodore | You that are (our) Help |
| Saint Theodore | You that are (our) Help |
| Christ conquers, Christ reigns, Christ commands, | Christ conquers, Christ reigns, Christ commands. |
| Christ conquers, Christ reigns, Christ commands, | Christ conquers, Christ reigns, Christ commands. |
| King of kings, Christ conquers, Christ reigns | King of kings, Christ conquers, Christ reigns. (Note: An English translation of the Latin text in Woolley (1915), pp. 42-43.) |

Further acclamations:
Our King, Christ conquers, Christ reigns. Our Hope, Christ conquers. Our Glory, Christ conquers. Our Mercy, Christ conquers, Our Help, Christ conquers. Our Strength, Christ conquers. Our Victory, Christ conquers. Our Liberation and Redemption, Christ conquers. Our Victory, Christ conquers. Our Armor, Christ conquers. Our Impregnable Wall, Christ conquers. Our Defense and Exaltation, Christ conquers. Our Light, Way and Life, Christ conquers. To him alone be command, glory and power through immortal ages. Amen. To him alone be vigor, strength and victory through all ages of ages. Amen. To him alone be honor, praise and jubilation through infinite ages of ages. Amen.

== Empresses and queens ==
Up to and including the coronation of Richenza of Northeim at Cologne in 1125, Holy Roman empresses and German queens were usually anointed and crowned separately from their husbands, unless joint ceremony was required by political circumstances. From then on, joint coronation ceremonies were more common.

== List of Roman imperial coronations ==
=== Frankish kings crowned Emperors of the Romans ===
| Emperor | Coronation date | Officiant | Location |
|---|---|---|---|
| Charles I (Charlemagne) | 25 December 800 | Pope Leo III | Rome, Italy |
| Louis I | 5 October 816 | Pope Stephen IV | Reims, France |
| Lothair I | 5 April 823 | Pope Paschal I | Rome, Italy |
| Louis II | 15 June 844 | Pope Sergius II | Rome, Italy |
| Charles II | 29 December 875 | Pope John VIII | Rome, Italy |
| Charles III | 12 February 881 | Pope John VIII | Rome, Italy |
| Guy III of Spoleto | 21 February 891 | Pope Stephen V | Rome, Italy |
| Lambert II of Spoleto | 30 April 892 | Pope Formosus | Ravenna, Italy |
| Arnulf of Carinthia | 22 February 896 | Pope Formosus | Rome, Italy |
| Louis III | 15 or 22 February 901 | Pope Benedict IV | Rome, Italy |
| Berengar | December 915 | Pope John X | Rome, Italy |

=== Holy Roman Emperors ===
| Emperor | Coronation date | Officiant | Location |
|---|---|---|---|
| Otto I | 2 February 962 | Pope John XII | Rome, Italy |
| Otto II | 25 December 967 | Pope John XIII | Rome, Italy |
| Otto III | 21 May 996 | Pope Gregory V | Rome, Italy |
| Henry II | 14 February 1014 | Pope Benedict VIII | Rome, Italy |
| Conrad II | 26 March 1027 | Pope John XIX | Rome, Italy |
| Henry III | 25 December 1046 | Pope Clement II | Rome, Italy |
| Henry IV | 31 March 1084 | Antipope Clement III | Rome, Italy |
| Henry V | 13 April 1111 | Pope Paschal II | Rome, Italy |
| Lothair III | 4 June 1133 | Pope Innocent II | Rome, Italy |
| Frederick I | 18 June 1155 | Pope Adrian IV | Rome, Italy |
| Henry VI | 14 April 1191 | Pope Celestine III | Rome, Italy |
| Otto IV | 4 October 1209 | Pope Innocent III | Rome, Italy |
| Frederick II | 22 November 1220 | Pope Honorius III | Rome, Italy |
| Great Interregnum | | | |
| Henry VII | 29 June 1312 | Ghibellines cardinals | Rome, Italy |
| Louis IV | 17 January 1328 | Senator Sciarra Colonna | Rome, Italy |
| Charles IV | 5 April 1355 | Pope Innocent VI's cardinal | Rome, Italy |
| Sigismund | 31 May 1433 | Pope Eugenius IV | Rome, Italy |
| Frederick III | 19 March 1452 | Pope Nicholas V | Rome, Italy |
| Charles V | 24 February 1530 | Pope Clement VII | Bologna, Italy |

== See also ==
- Vienna Coronation Gospels
- Coronation of the Hungarian monarch
- Coronation of the British monarch
- Coronation of the French monarch
