= Benedict XIII =

Benedict XIII may refer to:

- Pope Benedict XIII (1649–1730), pope from 1724 to 1730
- Antipope Benedict XIII (1328–1423), based in Avignon, France, in opposition to the pope in Rome

== See also ==
- Pope Benedict (disambiguation)
