= Pope Valentine =

Head of the Catholic Church in 827

- Bishop of Rome
- Church: Catholic Church
- Papacy began: c. 31 August 827
- Papacy ended: c. 10 October 827
- Predecessor: Eugene II
- Successor: Gregory IV

Orders
- Created cardinal: 820 by Paschal I

Personal details
- Born: Rome, Papal States
- Died: 10 October 827 Rome, Papal States

Pope Valentine (Latin: Valentinus; died 10 October 827) was the bishop of Rome and leader of the Papal States for two months in 827. He was unusually close to his predecessor, Eugene II, rumoured to be Valentine's father or lover, and became pope before being ordained as a priest. He was a nobleman and elected by nobility, which later became the custom.

== Career ==
Born in Rome in the region of the Via Lata, Valentine was the son of a Roman noble called Leontius. Showing an early aptitude for learning, he was moved from the school attached to the Lateran Palace and, according to the Liber Pontificalis, was made a deacon by Pope Paschal I (817–824). His biographer in the Liber Pontificalis praises his piety and purity of morals, which won him the favor of Paschal I, who raised him to the rank of archdeacon. He also was clearly favoured by Paschal's successor, Eugene II, to the point where rumours were circulated that Valentine was really Eugene's son. According to Louis-Marie DeCormenin, other rumours declared that Valentine and Eugene were involved in an illicit relationship.

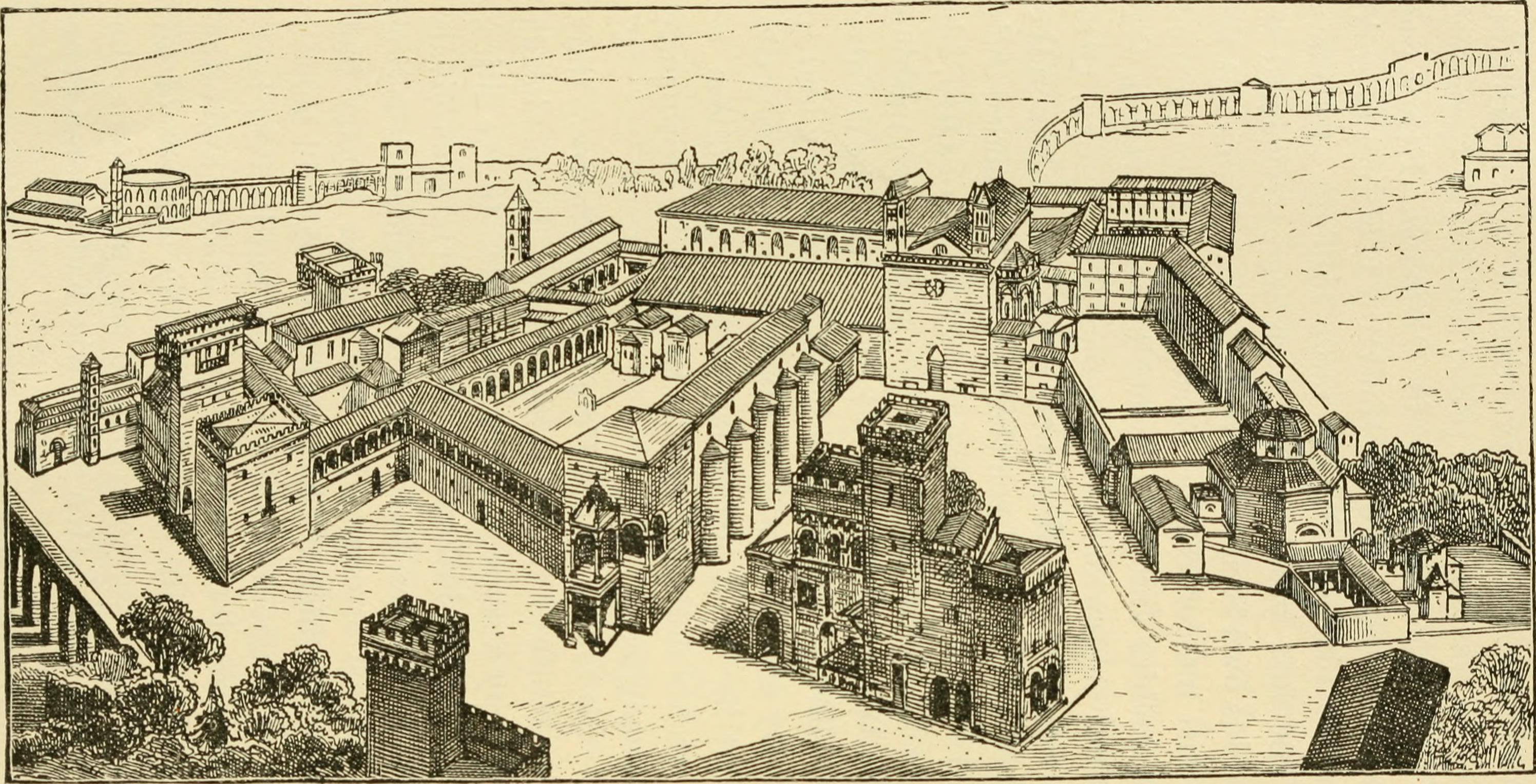
The Lateran Palace as it looked in the 14th century; it had not changed significantly since the 9th.

With the death of Eugene II, Valentine was acclaimed as pope by the Roman clergy, nobility and people. They took him from the Basilica di Santa Maria Maggiore and installed him in the Lateran Palace, ignoring his protests. In their haste, they enthroned him before he was ordained a priest. This was an unusual reversal of the normal proceedings, and in fact was the first time it had happened in the recorded history of the papacy, although it would be repeated during the pontificate of Benedict III. On the following Sunday, he was formally consecrated bishop at St. Peter's Basilica. There were no imperial representatives present during the election, and Valentine had no opportunity to ratify his election with the Carolingian emperor, as he was dead within five weeks, dying on 10 October 827.

== Legacy ==
The election of Valentine was another sign of the increased influence the Roman nobility was having in the papal electoral process. Not only had they managed to get one of their own elected, but they also took part in the election itself. The Lateran Council of 769, under Stephen III, had mandated that the election of the pope was to be the responsibility of the Roman clergy only, and that the nobility could only offer their respects after the pope had been chosen and enthroned. This council's edict had been abrogated, however, with the Ludowicianum of 817, which provided that the Roman lay nobility would participate in papal elections. This gradual encroachment into the papal electoral process would reach its nadir during the tenth century, when the papacy became the plaything of the Roman aristocracy.

== Notes ==
Catholic Church titles
Preceded by Eugene II	Pope; 827	Succeeded by Gregory IV
