= Antipope John =

Antipope John may refer to:

- Antipope John VIII (844), in opposition to Pope Sergius II
- Antipope John XVI (997–998), in opposition to Pope Gregory V
- Antipope John XXIII (1410–1415), in opposition to Pope Gregory XII

== See also ==
- Pope John (disambiguation)
