= Pope Paschal =

Pope Paschal may refer to:

- Antipope Paschal (687)
- Pope Paschal I (817–824), saint
- Pope Paschal II (1099–1118)
- Antipope Paschal III (1164–1168)
