= Pope Callixtus =

Pope Callixtus has been the papal name of three popes of the Catholic Church.

- Pope Callixtus I (saint; 217–222)
- Pope Callixtus II (1119–1124)
  - Antipope Callixtus III (1168–1178)
- Pope Callixtus III (1455–1458)

== See also ==
- List of popes
- Callistus (disambiguation)
