= Pope Pelagius =

Pelagius has been the papal name of two popes of the Roman Catholic Church. The name is the Latin form of the Greek name Πελαγιος (Pelagios), which was derived from πελαγος (pelagos) "the sea".

- Pope Pelagius I (556–561)
- Pope Pelagius II (579–590)

== See also ==
- List of popes
