= Stephen Pope =

Stephen Pope may refer to:

- Stephen Pope, bassist for surf rock band Wavves
- Stephen Pope (cricketer) (born 1983), English cricketer
- Stephen B. Pope, Cornell University professor
- Stephen Pope, aviation industry figure
- Stephen Pope (MP) (fl. 1388), English politician

== See also ==
- Steven Pope (born 1972), South African cricketer
- Steve Pope (footballer) (born 1976), English footballer
- Pope Stephen (disambiguation)
