= Pope Stephen =

There have been nine popes of the Roman Catholic Church named Stephen:

- Pope Stephen I (saint; 254–257)
  - Pope-elect Stephen (752), elected pope but died before his consecration; called Stephen II in sources prior to the 1960s
- Pope Stephen II (III) (752–757)
- Pope Stephen III (IV) (768–772)
- Pope Stephen IV (V) (816–817)
- Pope Stephen V (VI) (885–891)
- Pope Stephen VI (VII) (896–897)
- Pope Stephen VII (VIII) (929–931)
- Pope Stephen VIII (IX) (939–942)
- Pope Stephen IX (X) (1057–1058)

== See also ==
- Stephen Pope (disambiguation)
