= Pope Victor =

Pope Victor has been the papal name of three popes and two antipopes of the Catholic Church.

- Pope Victor I (saint; 189–199)
- Pope Victor II (1055–1057)
- Pope Victor III (1086–1087)
  - Antipope Victor IV (1138)
  - Antipope Victor IV (1159–1164)

== See also ==
- List of popes
