= Nicholas Pope =

Nicholas or Nick Pope may refer to:

- Nicholas Pope (artist) (1949–2026), British and Australian artist
- Nick Pope (footballer) (born 1992), English footballer
- Nick Pope (journalist) (1965–2026), English researcher and lecturer on UFO/UAP topics
- Nick Pope (British Army officer) (born 1962), British Army officer

== See also ==
- Pope Nicholas (disambiguation)
- Nick Cope, children's musician
