= Antipope John VIII =

Antipope in 844

- Papacy began: 25 January 844
- Papacy ended: c. 25 January 844
- Predecessor: Roman claimant: Gregory IV; Antipapal claimant: Constantine II; Philip
- Successor: Roman claimant: Sergius II; Antipapal claimant: Anastasius III
- Opposed to: Pope Sergius II
- Other post: Deacon of Rome

Antipope John VIII or Antipope John was an antipope, in the year 844. On the death of Pope Gregory IV (25 January 844), the populace of Rome declared John, a deacon with no known links to the aristocracy as his successor. They seized the Lateran Palace and enthroned him there. However, the lay aristocracy elected as pope the elderly, nobly born archpriest Sergius, ejected John from the Lateran, and swiftly crushed the opposition. Pope Sergius II's consecration was rushed through immediately, without waiting for imperial ratification from the Frankish court. Although some of his supporters wanted John put to death for what they considered his presumption, Sergius intervened to save his life and John was confined to a monastery. Nothing further is known about him.

== See also ==
- Papal selection before 1059
