= Pactum Hludowicianum =

817 treaty between the Papal States and Carolingian Empire

The (Pactum) Ludovicianum (also spelled Ludowicianum or Hludowicianum) was an agreement reached in 817 between the emperor Louis the Pious (“Ludovicus Pius”) and Pope Paschal I concerning the government of central Italy and the relation of the Papal States to the Carolingian Empire. The text of the Ludovicianum is preserved mainly in eleventh- and twelfth-century manuscripts of canon law and has been reconstructed by modern editors. Certain sections of the Ludovicianum are thought to be confirmations of agreements made between Louis's father, Charlemagne, and Pope Hadrian I during the former's trips to Rome in 781 and 787.

The negotiations which resulted in the Ludovicianum began during the pontificate of Stephen IV, but the agreement was only concluded shortly after the election of his successor, Paschal I, in January 817. Stephen had anointed and crowned Louis and his wife, Irmingard, at Reims in October 816. In return Louis had granted the pope everything he had requested, as recorded both in Stephen's biography in the Liber Pontificalis and Louis's biography, the Vita Hludovici imperatoris. Paschal, immediately after his election, sent an embassy to Louis requesting a confirmation of the pactum (agreement) that had been arranged with Stephen.

The earliest text purporting to be a complete version of the Pactum made between emperor and pope in 817 is found in late eleventh-century canon law texts, but based on a collection compiled by Cardinal Deusdedit to serve as a preliminary to his Collectio Canonum, finished in 1087. Both Anselm of Lucca and Bonizo of Sutri copied the Ludovicianum into their collections of canon law. The text of the Ludovicianum closely resembles the later Pactum Ottonianum between Emperor Otto the Great and Pope John XII (962). A manuscript fragment that also closely resembles the Ludovicianum and may in fact be a copy of it survives from the ninth or early tenth century, and was first published by Angelo Mercati in 1926. It was written in Caroline minuscule on papyrus, a writing material only regularly in use in the scriptoria of the papacy at the time.
