= Pope Agapetus =

Agapetus has been the papal name of two popes of the Roman Catholic Church.

- Pope Agapetus I (saint; 535–536)
- Pope Agapetus II (946–955)
