= Pope Sergius =

Pope Sergius could refer to:

- Pope Sergius I (saint; 687–701)
- Pope Sergius II (844–847)
- Pope Sergius III (904–911)
- Pope Sergius IV (1009–1012)
