= Pope Eugene =

Pope Eugene could refer to:

- Pope Eugene I (saint; 654–657)
- Pope Eugene II (824–827)
- Pope Eugene III (1145–1153)
- Pope Eugene IV (1431–1447)
