= Pope Leo =

Pope Leo is the name of fourteen heads of the Catholic Church:

- Pope Leo I (the Great; saint; 440–461)
- Pope Leo II (saint; 682–683)
- Pope Leo III (saint; 795–816)
- Pope Leo IV (saint; 847–855)
- Pope Leo V (903)
- Pope Leo VI (928–929)
- Pope Leo VII (936–939)
- Pope Leo VIII (964–965)
- Pope Leo IX (saint; 1049–1054)
- Pope Leo X (1513–1521)
- Pope Leo XI (1605)
- Pope Leo XII (1823–1829)
- Pope Leo XIII (1878–1903)
- Pope Leo XIV (since 2025)
