= Pope Martin =

Several popes have been named Martin (in Latin, Martinus):

- Pope Martin I (saint; 649–654)
- Pope Martin II (Pope Marinus I) (882–884)
- Pope Martin III (Pope Marinus II) (942–946)
- Pope Martin IV (1281–1285)
- Pope Martin V (1417–1431)

== See also ==
- Pope Marinus (disambiguation), to explain the occurrences of the Marinus name above
