= Pope Urban =

Pope Urban may refer to one of several popes of the Catholic Church:

- Pope Urban I (saint; 222–230)
- Pope Urban II (blessed; 1088–1099)
- Pope Urban III (1185–1187)
- Pope Urban IV (1261–1264)
- Pope Urban V (blessed; 1362–1370)
- Pope Urban VI (1378–1389)
- Pope Urban VII (1590), had the shortest recognized papal reign
- Pope Urban VIII (1623–1644)
