= Pope Lucius =

Pope Lucius may refer to:

- Pope Lucius I (saint; 253–254)
- Pope Lucius II (1144–1145)
- Pope Lucius III (1181–1185)

== See also ==
- List of popes
