= Pope Theodore =

Pope Theodore may refer to:

- Pope Theodore I (642–649)
  - Antipope Theodore (687)
- Pope Theodore II (897)
- Pope Tawadros I of Alexandria (Theodorus or Theodosius), 45th Pope of Alexandria & Patriarch of the See of St. Mark.
- Pope Tawadros II of Alexandria or Theodore II, elected Coptic Pope in 2012
