= Pope Gelasius =

Pope Gelasius can refer to:

- Pope Gelasius I (saint; 492–496)
- Pope Gelasius II (1118–1119)
