= Pope Nicholas =

Pope Nicholas could refer to:

- Pope Nicholas I (saint; 858–867)
- Pope Nicholas II (1059–1061)
- Pope Nicholas III (1277–1280)
- Pope Nicholas IV (1288–1292)
  - Antipope Nicholas V (1328–1330)
- Pope Nicholas V (1447–1455)

== See also ==
- Nicholas Pope (disambiguation)
