= Suppo I =

Duke of Spoleto
- Reign: 822 - 824
- Predecessor: Winigis
- Successor: Adelard
- Died: 5 March 824
- Issue: Mauring; Adelchis I

Suppo I (or Suppone) (died 5 March 824) was a Frankish nobleman who held lands in the Kingdom of Italy in the early ninth century.

In 817, he was made Count of Brescia, Parma, Piacenza, Modena, and Bergamo. He was also made a missus dominicus, along with the Brescian bishop Ratald, for Italy. In 818, he was instrumental in putting down the rebellion of Bernard against Emperor Louis the Pious. In 822, after the abdication and death of Duke Winigis, Suppo was created Duke of Spoleto by the grateful emperor and he passed Brescia to his son Mauring. Suppo's death was recorded by Einhard and Spoleto went to Adelard, who died within five months, leaving the duchy to Mauring.

Suppo probably had a Lombard wife, for his second son was named Adelchis.

Regnal titles
Preceded by Duke Winiges	Duke of Spoleto; 822–824	Succeeded by Adelard
