= Pope Anastasius =

Pope Anastasius may refer to:

- Pope Anastasius I (saint; 399–401)
- Pope Anastasius II (496–498)
  - Antipope Anastasius III (855)
- Pope Anastasius III (911–913)
- Pope Anastasius IV (1153–1154)
- Pope Anastasius of Alexandria, 605–616
