= Adelard of Spoleto =

Duke of Spoleto

Adelard

Duke of Spoleto
- Reign: March to August 824
- Predecessor: Suppo I
- Successor: Mauring
- Died: August 824

Adelard, Adalhard, or Adalard was briefly the Duke of Spoleto from March to August 824. He had previously served as count palatine before being appointed to the duchy.

== Appointment as duke ==
The Annals of Saint-Bertin record under the year 823 that Adelard, count palatine, was sent from Germany to Italy and ordered to take with him Mauring, count of Brescia.

The same annals record under the year 824 that Suppo, duke of Spoleto, was reported to have died, and that Adelard the count palatine, who was known as "the Younger", received the duchy of Spoleto.

== Death ==
Adelard died after five months as duke of Spoleto.

== Sources ==
- Wickham, Chris. Early Medieval Italy: Central Power and Local Society 400-1000. MacMillan Press: 1981.

Regnal titles
Preceded by Suppo I	Duke of Spoleto; 824	Succeeded by Mauring
