= Pope Marinus =

Pope Marinus could refer to:

- Pope Marinus I (882–884)
- Pope Marinus II (942–946)

Because of similarity of the names Marinus and Martinus, these 2 popes were erroneously referred to later as Martinus II and Martinus III respectively. As a result, Simon de Brion, the next Pope Martinus, took the name Martinus IV instead of Martinus II.

== See also ==
- Pope Martin (disambiguation)
