= Pope Sylvester =

Pope Sylvester, or Silvester may refer to:

- Pope Sylvester I (314–335), saint
- Pope Sylvester II (999–1003)
- Pope Sylvester III (1045)
- Antipope Sylvester IV (1105–1111)
