= Mauring =

Mauring (or Moringus) (died 824) was a Frankish nobleman, the son of Suppo I of the Supponids. He succeeded his father in Brescia as count (Brixiae comes) in 822 and, following the brief reign of Adelard, in Spoleto as duke in August 824. According to the Annales of Einhard and the Royal Frankish Annals, he died within a few days of his succession.

== Sources ==
- Wickham, Chris. Early Medieval Italy: Central Power and Local Society 400-1000. MacMillan Press: 1981.

Regnal titles
Preceded by Adelard	Duke of Spoleto; 824	Succeeded by Adelchis I
