= Pope Felix =

Pope Felix could refer to:

- Pope Felix I (saint; 269–274)
  - Antipope Felix II (355–365)
- Pope Felix III (saint; 483–492)
- Pope Felix IV (saint; 526–530)
  - Antipope Felix V, Amadeus VIII, Duke of Savoy (1439–1449)
