= Pope Damasus =

Pope Damasus is the name of two Popes of the Roman Catholic Church:

- Pope Damasus I (saint; 330–384)
- Pope Damasus II (1048)

== See also ==
- Damasus (disambiguation)
