= Pope Celestine =

There have been five Popes Celestine of the Roman Catholic Church:

- Pope Celestine I (saint; 422–432)
  - Pope-elect Celestine II (1124)
- Pope Celestine II (1143–1144)
- Pope Celestine III (1191–1198)
- Pope Celestine IV (1241)
- Pope Celestine V (saint; 1294)
