= Pope Adeodatus =

Pope Adeodatus can refer to:

- Pope Adeodatus I (saint; 615–618)
- Pope Adeodatus II (672–676)
