= Pope Benedict =

Benedict has been the papal name of sixteen popes of the Catholic Church. The name is derived from the Latin benedictus, meaning "blessed".

- Pope Benedict I (575–579)
- Pope Benedict II (saint; 684–685)
- Pope Benedict III (855–858)
- Pope Benedict IV (900–903)
- Pope Benedict V (964)
- Pope Benedict VI (972–974)
- Pope Benedict VII (974–983)
- Pope Benedict VIII (1012–1024)
- Pope Benedict IX (1032–1044, 1045–1046, 1047–1048)
  - Antipope Benedict X (1058–1059) – several cardinals alleged that his election was irregular and he was deposed; his papacy, though later declared illegitimate, has been taken into account in the conventional numbering of subsequent popes who took the same name
- Pope Benedict XI (blessed; 1303–1304)
- Pope Benedict XII (1334–1342)
  - Antipope Benedict XIII (1394–1423)
  - Antipope Benedict XIV (1424–1429, 1430–1437) – two individuals
- Pope Benedict XIII (servant of God; 1724–1730)
- Pope Benedict XIV (1740–1758)
- Pope Benedict XV (1914–1922)
- Pope Benedict XVI (2005–2013)

== See also ==
- Benedict (disambiguation)
