= Pope Stephen IV =

Head of the Catholic Church from 816 to 817

- Bishop of Rome
- Church: Catholic Church
- Papacy began: 22 June 816
- Papacy ended: 24 January 817
- Predecessor: Leo III
- Successor: Paschal I

Personal details
- Born: Rome, Papal States
- Died: 24 January 817 Rome, Papal States

Pope Stephen IV (Latin: Stephanus IV; died 24 January 817) was the bishop of Rome and leader of the Papal States from June 816 to his death on 24 January 817. Stephen belonged to a noble Roman family. In October 816, he crowned Louis the Pious as emperor at Reims, and persuaded him to release some Roman political prisoners he held in custody. He returned to Rome, by way of Ravenna, sometime in November and died the following January.

== Rise ==
The son of a Roman noble called Marinus, Stephen belonged to the same family which also produced the Popes Sergius II and Adrian II. The Liber Censuum says that Stephen was from the Massimi branch of the Massimo family, as was his successor, Paschal I. At a young age he was raised at the Lateran Palace during the pontificate of Adrian I, and it was under Leo III that he was ordained a subdeacon before he was subsequently made a deacon. Very popular among the Roman people, within ten days of Leo III's death, he was escorted to Saint Peter's Basilica and consecrated bishop of Rome on or about 22 June 816. It has been conjectured that his rapid election was an attempt by the Roman clergy to ensure that the Carolingian emperor Louis the Pious could not interfere.

== Pontificate ==
Immediately after his consecration Stephen ordered the Roman people to swear fidelity to Emperor Louis, after which Stephen sent envoys to the emperor notifying him of his election, and to arrange a meeting between the two at the emperor's convenience. With Louis' invitation, Stephen left Rome in August 816. Louis's nephew, King Bernard of Italy, was ordered to accompany Stephen to the emperor and the two crossed the Alps together. In early October, the pope and the emperor met at Rheims, where Louis prostrated himself three times before Stephen. At Mass on Sunday, 5 October 816, Stephen anointed Louis as emperor, placing a crown on his head that was claimed to belong to Constantine the Great. At the same time he also crowned Louis' wife, Ermengarde of Hesbaye, and saluted her as augusta. This event has been seen as an attempt by the papacy to establish a role in the creation of an emperor, which had been placed in doubt by Louis' self-coronation in 813.

Louis gave Stephen a number of presents, including an estate of land (most likely at Vendeuvre-sur-Barse) granted to the Roman church. They also renewed the pact between the popes and the kings of the Franks, confirming the privileges of the Roman church, and the continued existence of the recently emerged Papal States. Stephen also raised Bishop Theodulf of Orléans to the rank of archbishop, and had Louis release from their exile all political prisoners originally from Rome who had been held by the emperor resulting from the conflict that plagued the early part of Pope Leo III's reign. It is also believed that Stephen asked Louis to enforce reforms for the clergy who lived under the Rule of Chrodegang. This included ensuring that the men and women who lived there were to stay in separate convents, and that they were to hold the houses under a title of common property. He also regulated how much food and wine they could consume.

After visiting Ravenna on his way back from Rheims, Stephen returned to Rome before the end of November 816. Here, he apparently discontinued Leo III's policies of favouring clergy over lay aristocracy. After holding the traditional ordination of priests and bishops in December and confirming Farfa Abbey's possessions on condition that every day the monks would recite one hundred Kyrie eleison as well as a yearly payment to the Roman Church of ten golden solidi, Stephen died on 24 January 817. He was buried at St. Peter's, and was succeeded by Paschal I.

== Notes ==
Catholic Church titles
Preceded by Leo III	Pope; 816–817	Succeeded by Paschal I
