= Pope Sergius II =

Head of the Catholic Church from 844 to 847

- Bishop of Rome
- Church: Catholic Church
- Papacy began: January 844
- Papacy ended: 27 January 847
- Predecessor: Gregory IV
- Successor: Leo IV

Personal details
- Born: Rome, Papal States
- Died: 27 January 847

Pope Sergius II (Latin: Sergius II; died 27 January 847) was the bishop of Rome and leader of the Papal States from January 844 to his death in 847. Sergius II's pontificate saw the Arab raid against Rome as well as the city's redevelopment.

== Rise ==
Born to a noble family, Sergius was educated in the schola cantorum and ordained cardinal-priest of the Church of Sts. Martin and Sylvester by Pope Paschal I. Under Pope Gregory IV, he became archpriest.

At a preliminary meeting to designate a successor to Gregory IV, who died in January 844, Sergius was nominated by the aristocracy, while the people of Rome declared for the deacon John. The opposition was suppressed, with Sergius intervening to save John's life. John was, however, shut up in a monastery, and Sergius was duly consecrated, without seeking ratification of the Frankish court. Emperor Lothair I, however, disapproved of this abandonment of the Constitutio Romana of 824, which included a statute that no pope should be consecrated until his election had imperial approval. He sent an army under his son Louis, the recently appointed king of Italy, to re-establish his authority. The Church and the emperor reached an accommodation, with Sergius crowning Louis as king, but the pope did not accede to all the demands made upon him.

== Pontificate ==
Sergius contributed to urban redevelopment in Rome, improving churches, aqueducts, and the Lateran Basilica. He and his brother, Benedict, funded their building plans by selling appointments to various church positions to the highest bidder.

During his pontificate, the outskirts of Rome were ravaged, and the churches of St. Peter and St. Paul were sacked by Arabs, who also approached Portus and Ostia in August 846. During the raid, he and the people of Rome looked on helplessly as they hid behind the Aurelian Walls. Despite having been forewarned of the intentions of the raiders, Sergius is seen as having not acted adequately enough to prepare for that which eventuated.

Sergius died while negotiating between the patriarchs of Aquileia and Grado. He was succeeded by Leo IV.

== Popular culture ==
Pope Sergius was portrayed by John Goodman in the 2009 film Pope Joan.

== Sources ==
- Cheetham, Nicolas, Keepers of the Keys, New York: Charles Scribner's Sons, 1983. ISBN 0-684-17863-X
- Davis, Raymond (1995). The Lives of the Ninth-century Popes (Liber Pontificalis): The Ancient Biographies of Ten Popes from A.D. 817–891. Liverpool University Press. pp. 71–98. ISBN 978-0-85323-479-1.
- Mann, Horace Kinder (1906). The Lives of the Popes in the Early Middle Ages. Vol. II. London: Kegan Paul, Trench, Trübner. pp. 232–257.

Catholic Church titles
Preceded by Gregory IV	Pope; 844–847	Succeeded by Leo IV
