= Pope Leo III =

Head of the Catholic Church from 795 to 816

Pope Saint Leo III
- Bishop of Rome
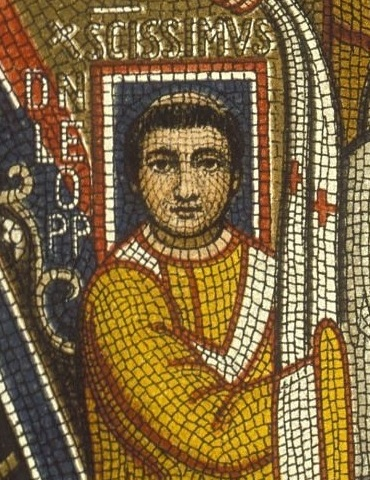
- Mosaic at Triclinium Leoninum
- Church: Catholic Church
- Papacy began: 27 December 795
- Papacy ended: 12 June 816
- Predecessor: Adrian I
- Successor: Stephen IV
- Previous post: Cardinal-Priest of Santa Susanna

Personal details
- Born: 750 Rome, Exarchate of Ravenna, Eastern Roman Empire
- Died: 12 June 816 (aged 65–66) Rome, Papal States
- Parents: Atzuppius or Asupius; Elizabeth

Sainthood
- Feast day: 12 June
- Venerated in: Roman Catholic Church

Pope Leo III (Latin: Leo III; died 12 June 816) was bishop of Rome and leader of the Papal States from 26 December 795 to his death on 12 June 816.

Protected by Charlemagne from the supporters of his predecessor, Adrian I, Leo subsequently strengthened Charlemagne's position by crowning him emperor. The coronation was not approved by most people in Constantinople, although the Byzantines, occupied with their own defenses, were in no position to offer much opposition.

== Rise ==
According to the Liber Pontificalis, Leo was "of the Roman nation, the son of Atzuppius" (natione romanus ex patre Atzuppio). The Chronicon Anianense says, more specifically, that he was "born in Rome to Asupius and Elizabeth" (natus rome ex patre asupio matre helisabeth). Usually considered to be of Greek origin, his father's name may suggest an Arab background. An earlier person of the same name or nickname, Atzypios, was an iconoclast adversary of John of Damascus.

Leo seems to have known Greek. He was made cardinal-priest of Santa Susanna by Pope Adrian I, and seemingly also vestiarius, or chief of the pontifical treasury, or wardrobe.

He was elected on 26 December 795, the day Adrian I was buried, and consecrated on the following day. It is quite possible that this haste may have been due to a desire on the part of the Romans to prevent any interference by the Franks. With the letter informing the Frankish ruler Charlemagne that he had been unanimously elected pope, Leo sent him the keys of the confession of St. Peter, and the standard of the city, and requested an envoy. This he did to show that he regarded the Frankish king as the protector of the Holy See. In return, Charlemagne sent letters of congratulation and a great part of the treasure which the king had captured from the Avars.

== Pontificate ==
Charlemagne's gift enabled Leo to be a great benefactor to the churches and charitable institutions of Rome. While Charlemagne's letter is respectful and even affectionate, it also exhibits his concept of the coordination of the spiritual and temporal powers, and he does not hesitate to remind the pope of his grave spiritual obligations.

=== Attack on Leo in 799 ===
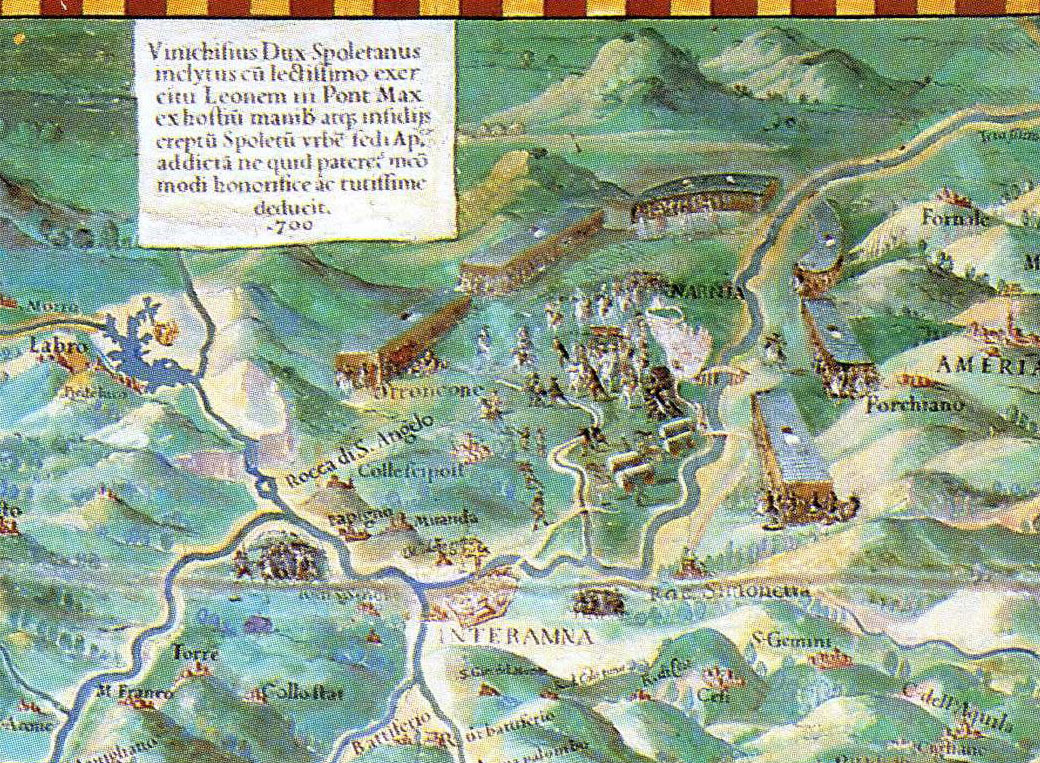
Rescue of Pope Leo III by Winigis; fresco by Ignazio Danti (1580)

Prompted by jealousy, ambition, or the thought that only someone of the nobility should hold the office of pope, a number of relatives of Adrian I formed a plot to render Leo unfit to hold his office. On the occasion of the procession of the Greater Litanies, 25 April 799, when the pope was making his way towards the Flaminian Gate, he was suddenly attacked by armed men. He was dashed to the ground, and an effort was made to root out his tongue and tear out his eyes which left him injured and unconscious. He was rescued by two of Charlemagne's missi dominici, who came with a considerable force. Duke Winiges of Spoleto sheltered the fugitive pope, who went later to Paderborn, where Charlemagne's camp then was and where he was received by the Frankish king with the greatest honour. This meeting forms the basis of the epic poem Karolus Magnus et Leo Papa.

Leo was accused by his enemies of adultery and perjury. Charlemagne ordered them to Paderborn, but no decision could be made. He then had Leo escorted back to Rome. In November 800, Charlemagne himself went to Rome, and on 1 December held a council there with representatives of both sides. Leo, on 23 December, took an oath of purgation concerning the charges brought against him, and his opponents were exiled.

=== Coronation of Charlemagne ===
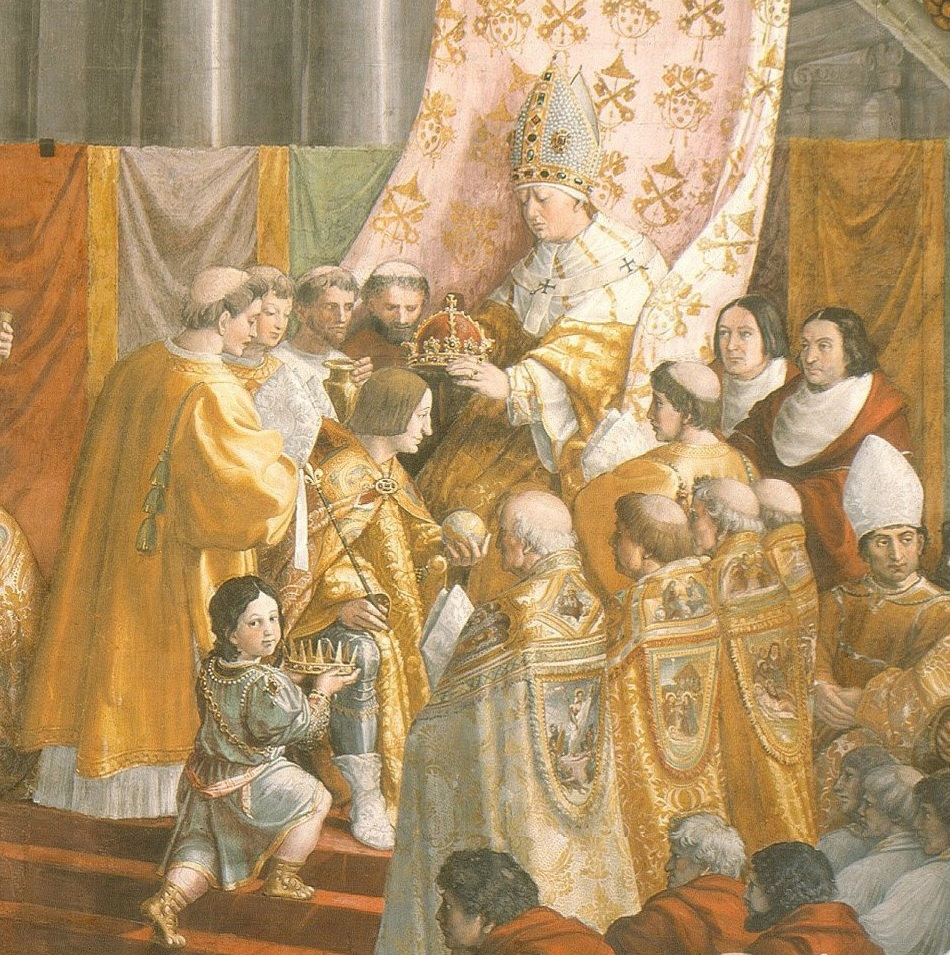
Detail from The Coronation of Charlemagne by Raphael (1517)

Charlemagne's father, Pepin the Short, defended the papacy against the Lombards and issued the Donation of Pepin, which granted the land around Rome to the pope as a fief. In 754 Pope Stephen II had conferred on Charlemagne's father the dignity of Patricius Romanus, which implied primarily the protection of the Roman Church in all its rights and privileges; above all in its temporal authority which it had gradually acquired (notably in the former Byzantine Duchy of Rome and the Exarchate of Ravenna) by just titles in the course of the two preceding centuries.

Two days after his oath, on Christmas Day 800, Leo crowned Charlemagne as Emperor of the Romans. According to Charlemagne's biographer, Einhard, Charlemagne had no suspicion of what was about to happen, and if informed would not have accepted the imperial crown. There is, however, no reason to doubt that for some time previous the elevation of Charlemagne had been discussed, both at home and at Rome, especially since the imperial throne in Constantinople was controversially occupied by a woman, Irene of Athens, and since the Carolingian dynasty had firmly established its power and prestige. The coronation offended Constantinople, which had seen itself still as the rightful defender of Rome, but Empress Irene, like many of her predecessors since Justinian I, was too weak to offer protection to the city or its much reduced citizenry.

In 808, Leo committed Corsica to Charlemagne for safe-keeping because of Muslim raids, originating from Al-Andalus, on the island. Nonetheless, Corsica, along with Sardinia, would still go on to be occupied by Muslim forces in 809 and 810.

=== Episcopal policy ===
Leo helped restore King Eardwulf of Northumbria and settled various matters of dispute between the archbishops of York and Canterbury. He also reversed Pope Adrian I's decision in the granting of the pallium to Bishop Hygeberht of Lichfield. He believed that the English episcopate had been misrepresented before Adrian and that therefore his act was invalid. In 803, Lichfield was a regular diocese again.

=== Theological policy ===
Pope Leo III unambiguously supported the current theological position in the West in his time: that Holy Spirit proceeds from both the Father and the Son; he stated on this position: "it is forbidden not to believe such a great mystery of the faith". However, he refused to change the creed which he said was the product of the "divine illumination" of the council fathers, and considered not everything needed for salvation was in the creed. Leo III "placed two silver shields in Rome with the uninterpolated creed in both Greek and Latin." The Liber Pontificalis states Leo III put those shields at the top of St. Peter's entrance "in his love for and as a safeguard for the orthodox and catholic apostolic faith".

== Death and legacy ==
Leo III died in 816 after a reign of more than 20 years. He was originally buried in his own monument. However, some years after his death, his remains were put into a tomb that contained the first four popes named Leo. In the 18th century, the relics of Leo the Great were separated from his namesakes, and he was given his own chapel.

Leo III was canonized by Clement X, who, in 1673, had Leo's name entered in the Roman Martyrology.

== See also ==
- List of Catholic saints
- List of popes
- Donation of Constantine

Catholic Church titles
Preceded by Adrian I	Pope; 795–816	Succeeded by Stephen IV
