= Constitutio Romana =

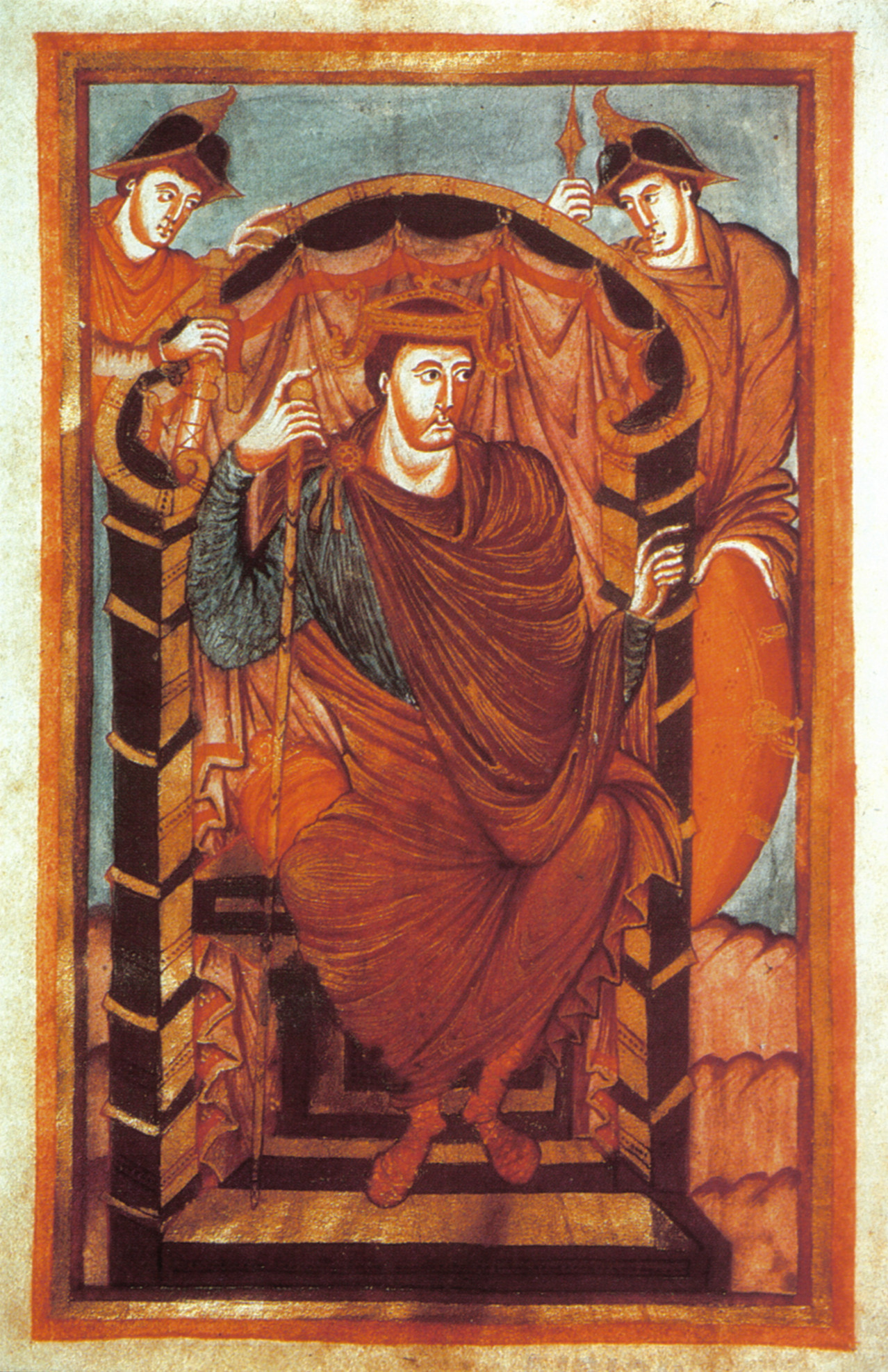
Lothair I in the Gospels of Lothair, c. 849–851, now located in the Bibliothèque nationale de France

The Constitutio Romana (or “Roman Constitution”) was drawn up between King Lothair I of Italy (818–855), co-emperor with his father, Louis the Pious, since 817, and Pope Eugene II (824–827) and confirmed on 11 November 824. At the time the election of Eugene was being challenged by Zinzinnus, the candidate of the Roman populace. Eugene agreed to several concessions to imperial power in central Italy in return for receiving the military and juridical support of Lothair. The Constitutio was divided into nine articles. It introduced the earliest known Papal Oath, which the Pope-elect was to give to an imperial legate before receiving consecration. It also restored the custom established by Pope Stephen III in 769 whereby both the laity and clergy of Rome would participate in Papal elections.

There has been some debate between modern scholars whether the Constitutio was a "dead letter" with little practical impact, or marked a stage of the road to imperial domination of the Papacy.

== Contents ==
The constitution advanced the imperial pretensions in the city of Rome, but also established a system to check the power of the nobles. It decreed that those who were under the special protection of the pope or emperor were to be inviolable, and that proper obedience be rendered to the pope and his officials; that church property was not to be plundered after the death of a pope; that only those to whom the right had been given by the deceased Pope Stephen III, in 769, should take part in papal elections; that two commissioners were to be appointed, one by the pope and the other by the emperor, who should report to them how justice was administered, so that any failure in the administration might be corrected by the pope, or, in the event of his not doing so, by the emperor; that the people should be judged according to the relevant law (Roman, Salic, or Lombard) under which they had elected to live; that the Church's property be restored to it; that robbery with violence be put down; that when the emperor was in Rome the chief officials should appear before him to be admonished to do their duty; and, finally, that all must obey the Roman pontiff. By command of the pope and Lothair, the people had to swear that, saving the fidelity they had promised the pope, they would obey the Emperors Louis and Lothair; would not allow a papal election to be made contrary to the canons; and would not suffer the pope-elect to be consecrated save in the presence of the emperor's envoys and an oath of homage from the newly elected Pope.

== Revocation ==
Sixty years later, the Constitutio Romana was temporarily revoked by Pope Marinus I when he issued a decree stating that the emperors would not interfere, either directly or through their ambassadors, in the election of a pope. However, in 962, many of the clauses of the Constitutio Romana were reintroduced into the Diploma Ottonianum.
