= Pope Eugene II =

Head of the Catholic Church from 824 to 827

- Bishop of Rome
- Church: Catholic Church
- Papacy began: 6 June 824
- Papacy ended: 27 August 827
- Predecessor: Paschal I
- Successor: Valentine

Personal details
- Born: Rome, Papal States
- Died: 27 August 827 Rome, Papal States

Pope Eugene II (Latin: Eugenius II; died 27 August 827) was the bishop of Rome and leader of the Papal States from 6 June 824 until his death.

A native of Rome, he was chosen by nobles to succeed Paschal I as pope despite the clergy and the people favoring Zinzinnus. The influence of the Carolingian Franks on the selection of popes was then firmly established. Pope Eugene convened a council at Rome in 826 to condemn simony and suspend untrained clergy. It was decreed that schools were to be established at cathedral churches and other places to give instruction in sacred and secular literature. His involvement in the Byzantine Iconoclasm controversy was largely inconsequential.

== Early career ==
In earlier editions of the Liber Pontificalis Eugene is said to have been the son of Boemund, but in the more recent and more accurate editions, his father's name is not given. While he was archpriest of St Sabina on the Aventine, and was said to have fulfilled most conscientiously the duties of his position. Eugene is described by his biographer as simple and humble, learned and eloquent, handsome and generous, a lover of peace, and wholly occupied with the thought of doing what was pleasing to God.

== Accession ==
Eugene was elected pope on 6 June 824, after the death of Paschal I. Paschal had attempted to curb the rapidly increasing power of the Roman nobility, who had turned for support to the Franks to strengthen their positions against him. When Paschal died, these nobles made strenuous efforts to replace him with a candidate of their own. The clergy put forward Zinzinnus, a candidate likely to continue the policy of Paschal. Even though the Roman Council of 769 under Stephen III had decreed that the nobles had no right to a real share in a papal election, the nobles were successful in securing the consecration of Eugene. Eugene's candidacy was endorsed by Abbot Walla, who was then in Rome and served as a councilor to both the current emperor, Louis the Pious, and his predecessor, Charlemagne.

The election of Eugene II was a triumph for the Franks, and they subsequently resolved to improve their position. Emperor Louis the Pious accordingly sent his son Lothair I to Rome to strengthen the Frankish influence. The Roman nobles who had been banished during the preceding reign and fled to France were recalled, and their property was restored to them. A Constitutio Romana was then agreed upon between the pope and the emperor in 824 which advanced the imperial pretensions in the city of Rome, but also checked the power of the nobles. This constitution included the statute that no pope should be consecrated until his election had the approval of the Frankish emperor. It decreed that those who were under the special protection of the pope or emperor were to be inviolable, and that church property not be plundered after the death of a pope.

== Pontificate ==
Seemingly before Lothair left Rome, there arrived ambassadors from Emperor Louis and from the Greeks concerning the controversy of Byzantine Iconoclasm. At first the iconoclast Eastern Roman Emperor Michael II showed himself tolerant towards the icon worshippers, and their great champion, Theodore the Studite, wrote to him to exhort him "to unite us (the Church of Constantinople) to the head of the Churches of God, Rome, and through it with the three patriarchs" and to refer any doubtful points to the decision of Old Rome in accordance with ancient custom. But Michael soon forgot his tolerance, bitterly persecuted the icon worshippers, and endeavoured to secure the co-operation of Louis the Pious. He also sent envoys to the pope to consult him on certain points connected with the worship of icons. Before taking any steps to meet the wishes of Michael, Louis asked the pope's permission for a number of his bishops to assemble and make a selection of passages from the Fathers to elucidate the question that the Greeks had put before them. The leave was granted, but the bishops who met at Paris in 825 were incompetent for the task. Their collection of extracts from the Fathers was a mass of confused and ill-digested lore, and both their conclusions and the letters they wished the pope to forward to the Greeks were based on a complete misunderstanding of the decrees of the Second Council of Nicaea. Their labours do not appear to have accomplished much; nothing is known of the result of their researches.

In 826 Eugene held an important council at Rome of 62 bishops, in which 38 disciplinary decrees were issued. The council passed several enactments for the restoration of church discipline, and took measures for the foundation of schools or chapters. The decrees are noteworthy as showing that Eugene had at heart the advancement of learning. Not only were ignorant bishops and priests to be suspended till they had acquired sufficient learning to perform their sacred duties, but it was decreed that, as in some localities there were neither masters nor zeal for learning, masters were to be attached to the episcopal palaces, cathedral churches and other places to give instruction in sacred and polite literature. It also ruled against priests wearing secular dress or engaging in secular occupations. Simony was forbidden. Eugene also adopted various provisions for the care of the poor, widows and orphans, and on that account received the name of "father of the people".

To help in the work of the conversion of the North, Eugene wrote commending St. Ansgar, the Apostle of the Scandinavians, and his companions "to all the sons of the Catholic Church".

== Death and legacy ==
Eugene II died on 27 August 827. It is supposed that he was buried in St. Peter's in accordance with the custom of the time, even though there is no documentary record to confirm it. He was succeeded by Valentine, with whom he had been so close that rumours circulated that Eugene was Valentine's father or lover.

Coins of Eugene II are extant bearing his name and that of Emperor Louis. As pope, Eugene beautified his ancient church of St. Sabina with mosaics and metalwork bearing his name that were still intact as late as the 16th century.

Catholic Church titles
Preceded by Paschal I	Pope; 824–827	Succeeded by Valentine
