= Pope Paschal I =

Head of the Catholic Church from 817 to 824

Pope Saint Paschal I
- Bishop of Rome
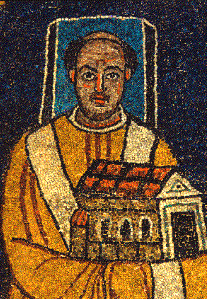
- Mosaic at Santa Prassede
- Church: Catholic Church
- Papacy began: 25 January 817
- Papacy ended: 11 February 824
- Predecessor: Stephen IV
- Successor: Eugene II

Personal details
- Born: Rome, Papal States
- Died: 11 February 824 Rome, Papal States
- Buried: Santa Prassede, Rome
- Parents: Episcopa Theodora and Bonusus

Sainthood
- Feast day: 11 February or 16 May; 14 May Eastern Orthodox Church
- Venerated in: Catholic Church; Eastern Orthodox Church
- Attributes: Papal vestments; Pallium

Pope Paschal I (Latin: Paschalis I; died 824) was the bishop of Rome and leader of the Papal States from 25 January 817 to his death in 824.

Paschal was a member of an aristocratic Roman family. Before his election to the papacy, he was abbot of St. Stephen's monastery, which served pilgrims. In Rome in 823 he crowned Lothair I as Holy Roman Emperor. He rebuilt a number of churches in Rome, including three basilicas.

== Early life ==
According to the Liber Pontificalis, Paschal was a native of Lazio Rome born Pascale Massimi and son of Bonosus and Episcopa Theodora. The Liber Censuum says that Paschal was from the Massimi branch of the Massimo family, as was his predecessor, Stephen IV.

Pope Leo III placed Paschal in charge of the monastery of St Stephen of the Abyssinians, where his responsibilities included the care of pilgrims visiting Rome. According to early modern accounts, Leo III may have elevated Paschal as the cardinal priest of Santa Prassede. Goodson attributes this account to a "desire to explain the attention that the pope so lavishly and prominently paid to that church later in his career."

== Accession ==
Paschal became pope on 25 January 817, just one day after the sudden death of Stephen IV. This decision was made without the sanction of Emperor Louis the Pious. Paschal began his pontificate apologizing for this slight, stressing that the office had been thrust upon him. He claimed that the decision had been made to avoid factional strife in Rome. According to the Liber Pontificalis, Pope Paschal's legate Theodore returned with a document titled Pactum cum Paschali pontifice, in which the emperor congratulated Paschal, recognized his sovereignty over the Papal States, and guaranteed the free election of future pontiffs. This document has since been challenged by historians as a forgery.

== Papacy ==
At first, Emperor Louis confirmed the agreement reached in Rheims with Paschal's predecessor, Stephen IV, and detailed in the document Pactum Ludovicanum about free papal elections and noninterference in Church affairs unless officially asked for help. The two worked together to send Archbishop Ebbo of Rheims to evangelize the Danes in 822.

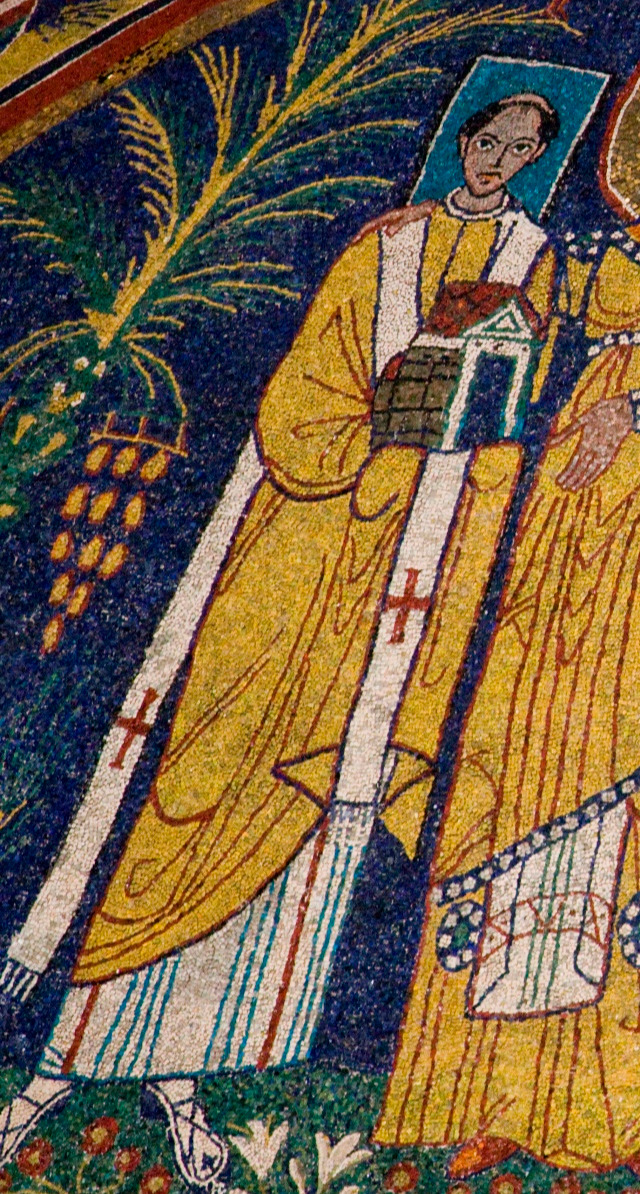
Mosaic of Paschal I from Santa Cecilia in Trastevere

On Easter Sunday of 823, Paschal crowned and anointed Louis's son Lothair I. Lothair was less amenable to cooperating with the Papal Curia than his father. He held a court and declared Farfa Abbey, just north of Rome, exempt from papal taxation. Paschal's aristocratic opponents in the papal palace, especially his former legate, Theodore, and his son-in-law, Leo, who turned to the young leader of the Franks for support in their opposition to Paschal. The decision outraged the Roman nobility and led to an uprising against the authority of the Roman Curia in northern Italy led by Theodore and Leo. The revolt was quickly suppressed, and two of its leaders were seized, blinded, and afterwards beheaded by members of the papal household. Paschal denied any involvement, but the Emperor remained suspicious and sent two commissioners to investigate. Paschal refused to submit to the authority of the imperial court, but he did take an oath of purgation before a synod of thirty-four bishops. The commissioners returned to Aachen, and Emperor Louis let the matter drop.

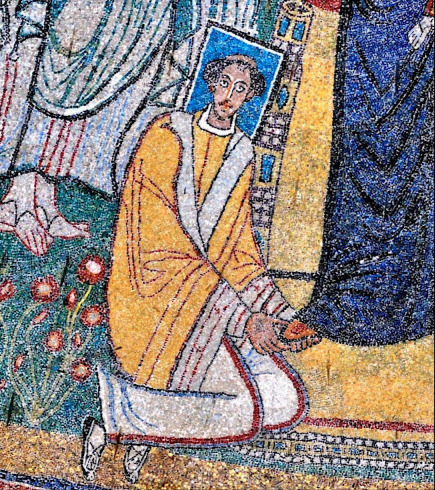
Mosaic of Paschal I from Santa Maria in Domnica

=== Construction projects ===
Paschal gave shelter to exiled monks from the Byzantine Empire who had fled persecution for their opposition to iconoclasm. He both offered the exiled Byzantine mosaic artists work decorating churches in Rome and wrote to Louis the Pious and the Byzantine emperor Leo the Armenian in support of those who opposed iconoclasm.

Paschal rebuilt three basilicas of Rome: Santa Prassede, Santa Maria in Domnica, and Santa Cecilia in Trastevere. These churches contain mosaics with lifelike portraits of Paschal. Paschal is credited with finding the body of Saint Cecilia in the Catacomb of Callixtus and translating it to the rebuild the basilica of Santa Cecilia in Trastevere. Paschal also undertook significant renovations on Basilica di Santa Maria Maggiore. In addition, Paschal added two oratories to Old St. Peter's Basilica, SS. Processus et Martinianus and SS. Xistus et Fabianus, which did not survive the 16th century renovation of St. Peter's.

Paschal is also sometimes credited with the renovation of Santo Stefano del Cacco in early modern sources, but this renovation was actually undertaken by Pope Paschal II.

According to Goodson, Paschal "used church-building to express the authority of the papacy as an independent state."

=== Writings ===
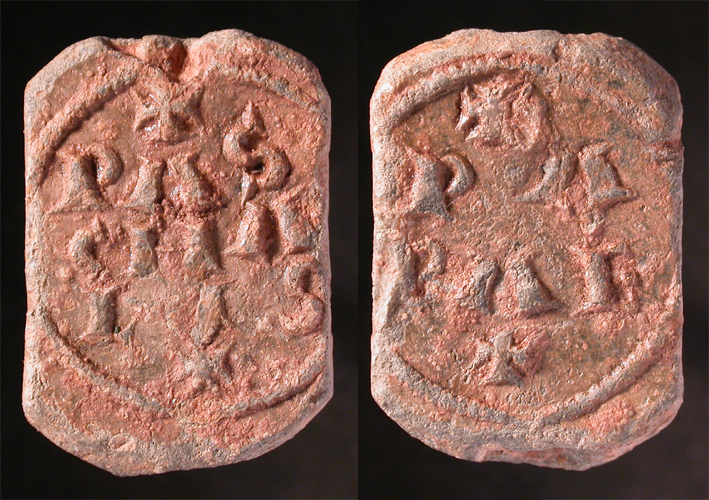
Papal bulla of Paschal I

Only six known letters written by Paschal remain. The first (Jaffé 2546) confirms the possessions of the Territorial Abbey of Farfa. The second and third (Jaffé 2547 and Jaffé 2548) were written to a Frankish abbot prior to and after his elevation as archbishop of Vienne. The fourth (Jaffé 2550) was written to Louis the Pious. The fifth (Jaffé 2551, preserved in the Biblioteca Ambrosiana) confirms the privileges of the church of Ravenna. The last (Jaffé 2553) was written to Ebbo, the archbishop of Reims.

== Death ==
Paschal died on 11 February 824. The Roman Curia refused him the honour of burial within St. Peter's Basilica because of his harsh government of the Roman people. He was instead buried in the Basilica of Santa Prassede, which also contains the famous Episcopa Theodora mosaic of his mother.

Paschal was canonized in the late sixteenth century. His feast day in the Roman calendar prior to 1963 was 14 May. It is currently celebrated on 11 February.

Pope and Patriarch of Rome (817–824), confessor is honored in Orthodox Church on 14 May.

== See also ==
- List of Catholic saints
- List of popes
- Pope Saint Paschal I, patron saint archive

Catholic Church titles
Preceded by Stephen IV	Pope; 817–824	Succeeded by Eugene II
