= Urban (name) =

Urban as a given name or surname may refer to:

== Given name ==
- Pope Urban (disambiguation)
- Urban of Langres, 4th-century French saint and bishop
- Urban (bishop of Llandaff) (1076–1134), Welsh bishop
- Urban of Macedonia, 1st-century bishop, martyr and saint
- Urban Blitz, English rock musician
- Urban "Red" Faber (1888–1976), American baseball pitcher
- Urban Federer (born 1968), Swiss Catholic prelate
- Urban Gad (1879–1947), Danish film director
- Urban Hansen (1908–1986), Danish politician
- Urban Henry (1935–1979), American football player
- Urban Klavžar (born 2004), Slovenian basketball player
- Urban Meyer (born 1964), American football coach
- Urban Odson (1918–1986), American football player
- Urban Priol (born 1961), German comedian
- Urban Shocker (1890–1928), American baseball pitcher
- Urban Symphony, Estonian musical group

== Surname ==
- Adolf Urban (1914–1943), German footballer
- Aleksandra Urban (born 1978), Polish painter
- Amanda Urban (born 1946/7), American literary agent
- Barry Urban (1968–2025), Australian politician
- Charles Urban (1867–1942), Anglo-American film producer and distributor
- Damir Urban (born 1968), Croatian rock singer/songwriter
- Danúncia Urban (born 1933), Brazilian entomologist
- Eric Urban, French mathematician
- Ewald Urban (1913–1959), Polish footballer
- Faye Urban (1945–2020), Canadian tennis player
- Friedrich Maria Urban (1878–1964), Austrian psychologist
- Gábor Urbán (born 1984), Hungarian footballer
- Gasper Urban (1923–1998), American football player
- George Urban (1921–1997), Hungarian writer, journalist and radio broadcaster
- George Urban Jr. (1850–1928), American businessman
- Glen L. Urban (born 1940), American professor
- Heinrich Urban (1837–1901), German violinist and composer
- Henry C. Urban (1848–1927), German architect
- Ignatz Urban (1848–1931), German botanist
- Jan Urban (born 1962), Polish footballer and manager
- Jerheme Urban (born 1980), American National Football League player
- Jerzy Urban (1933–2022), Polish journalist, writer, politician and former communist press secretary
- Jörg Urban (born 1964), German politician
- Josef Urban (1899–1968), Czechoslovak wrestler
- Joseph Urban (1872–1933), Austrian artist and architect
- Karl Urban (disambiguation)
- Keith Urban (born 1967), Australian country music singer, songwriter and record producer
- Klaudiusz Urban (born 1968), Polish chess player
- Luboš Urban (born 1957), Czech footballer and manager
- Łukasz Robert Urban, Polish victim of 2016 Berlin truck attack, original truck driver
- Marcus Urban (born 1971), German footballer and diversity adviser
- Mark Urban (born 1961), British journalist and writer
- Mark C. Urban, American biologist and professor
- Matt Urban (1919–1995), American lieutenant colonel and Medal of Honor recipient
- Max Urban (disambiguation)
- Milo Urban (1904–1982), Slovak writer, journalist and World War II collaborator
- Miloš Urban (born 1967), Czech horror novelist
- Paweł Urban, chemistry professor working at the National Tsing Hua University
- Pavo Urban (1968–1991), Croatian photographer
- Peter Urban (disambiguation)
- Shirley M. Frye (née Urban), American mathematics educator
- Simon Urban (born 1975), German novelist
- Stuart Urban (born 1958), British film and television director
- Thomas Urban (born 1954), German journalists
- Tim Urban (born 1989), American singer

== See also ==
- Benjamin D'Urban (1777–1849), British general and colonial administrator
- D'Urban Armstrong (1897–1918), South African First World War flying ace
- Saint Urban (disambiguation)
- Urbanus, Belgian comedian
- Orbán (ironmaster), Hungarian iron founder and engineer
- Urbain (French), Urbano (Italian Spanish), Orban (Hungarian), Urpo (Finnish), Urbánek (Czech/Slovak), Urbonas and Urbonavičius (Lithuanian), Urbanowicz, Urbański (Polish)
