= Urbanavičius =

- Lithuanian surname
- m.: Urbanavičius
- f.: (unmarried): Urbanavičiūtė
- f.: (married): Urbanavičienė
- Related names: Urbonaitis (native Lithuanian patronymic from given name Urbonas)

Urbanavičius is a Lithuanian-language surname, Lithuanized from the Slavic patronymic counterparts: Polish Urbanowicz, Russian Urbanovich (Урбанович), and Belarusian Urbanovič (Урбановіч), derived from the given name Urban.

Notable people with the surname include:

- Bronius Urbanavičius (1918-1993), Soviet WWII partisan, Hero of the Soviet Union
- Dalia Urbanavičienė (born 1958), Lithuanian ethnomusicologist, doctor of sciences, actress
- Justinas Urbanavičius (born 1982), Lithuanian politician, M.P.
- Vladas Urbanavičius (born 1951), Lithuanian sculptor
- Vytautas Urbanavičius (1935) (1935–2024), Lithuanian archeologist

== See also ==
- Urbonavičius
