= Urbain =

Urbain is a name of French origin which may refer to:

== Given name ==
- Urbain Audibert (1789–1846), French nurseryman
- Urbain Boiret (1731–1774), Canadian priest
- Urbain Bouriant (1849–1903), French egyptologist
- Urbain Braems (born 1933), Belgian soccer player
- Urbain Cancelier (fl. 1988–2012), French comedian and actor
- Urbain Dubois (1818–1901), French chef
- Urbain Gohier (1862–1951), French lawyer and journalist
- Urbain Grandier (1590–1634), French priest
- Urbain Johnson (1824–1917), Canadian politician
- Urbain de Florit de La Tour de Clamouze (1794–1868), French lay brother
- Urbain Le Verrier (1811–1877), French mathematician
- Urbain Lippé (1831–1896), Canadian notary and politician
- Urbain de Maillé, 1st Marquis of Brézé (1597–1650), French military officer and diplomat
- Urbain Mbenga, Guinean and Congolese religious leader
- Urbain Olivier (1810–1888), Swiss writer
- Urbain Ozanne (1835–1903), French-born American political activist, sheriff and businessman

== Surname ==
- Achille Urbain (1884–1957), French biologist
- Georges Urbain (1872–1938), French chemist
- Ismael Urbain (1812–1884), French journalist and interpreter
- Jacques Urbain, Belgian scientist
- Jean-Didier Urbain (born 1951), French sociologist
- Walter M. Urbain (1910–2002), American food scientist

== See also ==
- Saint-Urbain (disambiguation)
- Urban (name)
