= Urbański =

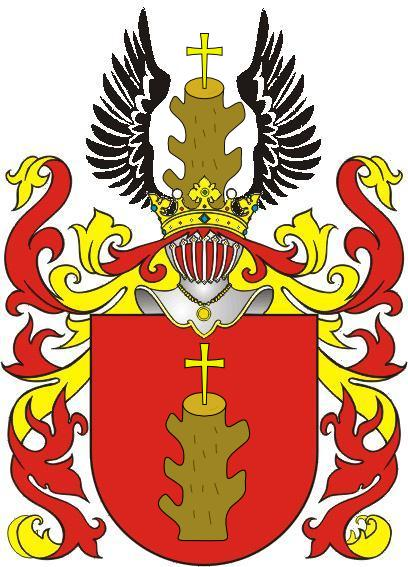
Nieczuja coat of arms used by some of Urbański family

Urbański (feminine: Urbańska, plural: Urbańscy) is a Polish surname. Some of them use: Leliwa coat of arms or Nieczuja coat of arms. Notable people with the surname include:

- Alfred Urbański (1899–1983), Polish politician
- Anatoliy Urbanskyi (born 1975), Ukrainian politician
- Annika Urbanski (born 1994), German politician
- Ashley Urbanski (born 1992), American professional wrestler
- Barry Urbanski, American ice hockey goaltender and coach
- Bartłomiej Urbański (born 1998), Polish footballer
- Billy Urbanski (1903–1973), American baseball player
- Calla Urbanski (born 1960), American pair skater
- David Urbansky (1843–1897), Union Army soldier during the American Civil War
- Douglas Urbanski (born 1957) American film producer
- Edmond Urbanski (1927–1976), French footballer
- Hubert Urbański (born 1966), Polish television presenter
- Igor Urbanski (born 1970), Ukrainian luger
- Jacqueline Urbanski
- James Urbanski
- Johann Georg Urbansky (Jan Jerzy Urbański) (1675–1738), Bohemian-German baroque-era sculptor and carver
- Kacper Urbański (born 2004), Polish footballer
- Krystyna Machnicka-Urbańska (born 1947), Polish fencer
- Krzysztof Urbański (born 1982), Polish conductor
- Mateusz Urbański (born 1990), Polish footballer
- Marlena Urbańska (born 1998), Polish handballer
- Matthew Urbanski (born 1963), American landscape architect
- Michael Urbanski (born 1956), American jurist
- Natasza Urbańska (born 1977), Polish singer
- Paweł Urbański (born 1987), Polish ski jumper
- Przemysław Urbański (born 1982), Polish footballer
- Silke Urbanski (born 1964), German historian and politician
- Tim Urbanski
- Ulrike Urbansky (born 1977), German hurdler
- Wanda Urbanska, American author, television host, and political strategist
- Wojciech Urbański (born 2005), Polish professional footballer
- Wojtek Urbański, Polish composer, music producer and arranger
- Yevgeni Urbansky (1932–1965), Soviet Russian actor

== See also ==
- Urbanowicz
