= 2nd Dragoon Regiment (France) =

- 2e régiment de dragons
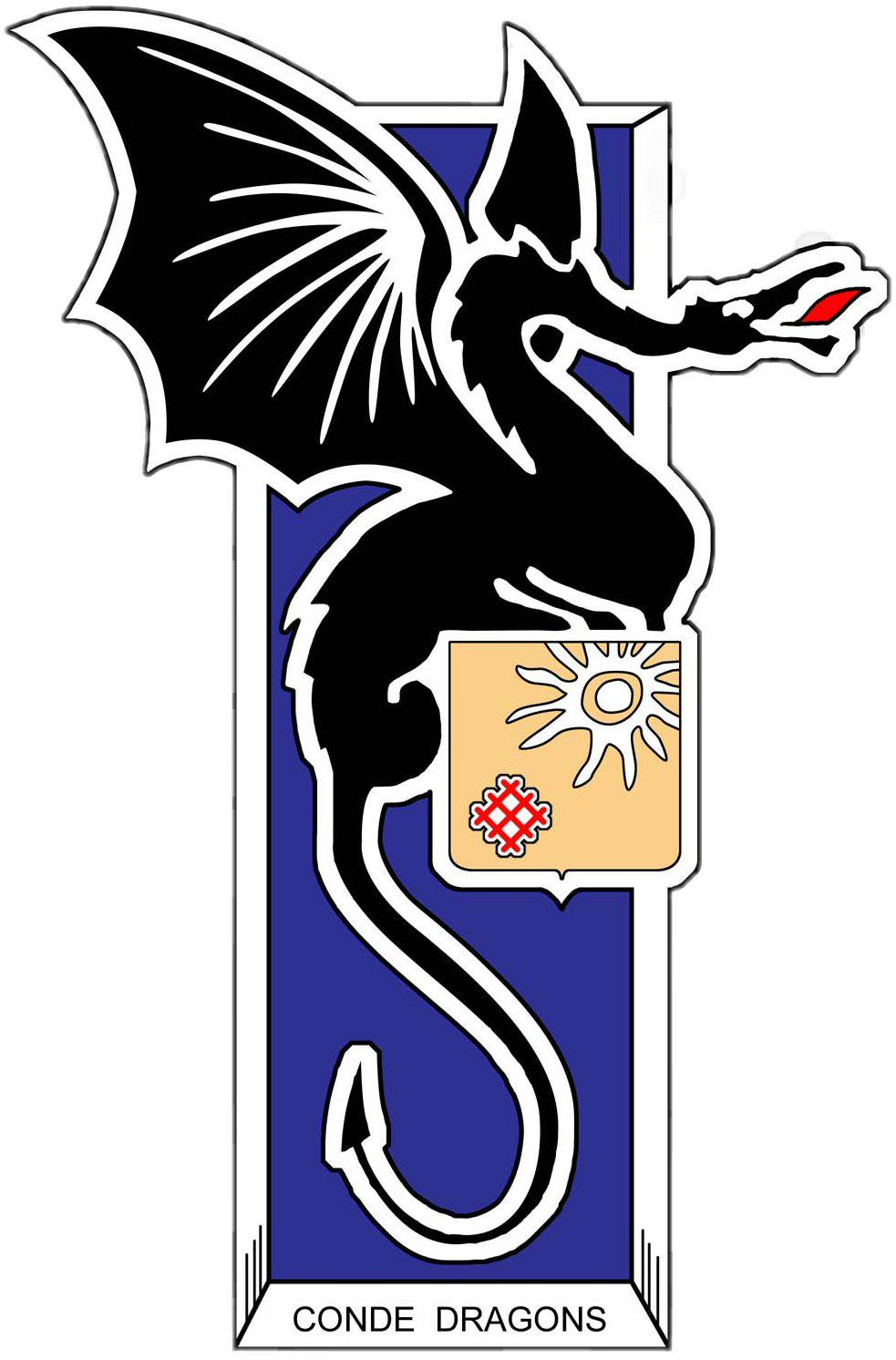
- Active: 1556–1815; 1815–1942; 1943–Present
- Country: Kingdom of France (1556–1792); First French Empire (1792–1815); Bourbon Restoration (1815–1848); France (1848–Present)
- Branch: French Army
- Type: Armoured cavalry
- Role: CBRN defence
- Size: 7 squadrons, 849 personnel (2013)
- Part of: 3rd Division
- Garrison/HQ: Fontevraud-l'Abbaye
- Nickname: "Condé-Dragons"
- Patron: Louis, Grand Condé
- Mottos: Da materiam splendescam "Give me a chance to shine"
- March: "Marche de Condé-Dragons"
- Current equipment: VAB NBC reconnaissance; VLRA NBC
- Conflicts: Thirty Years' War; Franco-Spanish War; Reapers' War; Fronde; Anglo-Spanish War; War of Devolution; Franco-Dutch War; War of the Reunions; War of the League of Augsburg; War of the Spanish Succession; War of the Polish Succession; War of the Austrian Succession; Seven Years' War; War of the First Coalition; War in the Vendée; War of the Second Coalition; War of the Third Coalition; War of the Fourth Coalition; Peninsular War; War of the Fifth Coalition; War of the Sixth Coalition; Hundred Days; Spanish Expedition; Franco-Prussian War; World War I; World War II; Algerian War
- Decorations: Croix de guerre 1914–1918; with two palmes and two vermeil stars; Croix de guerre 1939–1945; with two palmes; Médaille des évadés
- Battle honours: Valmy 1792; Zurich 1799; Hohenlinden 1800; Austerlitz 1805; Iena 1806; La Mortagne 1914; Ypres 1914; Flandres 1918; Champagne 1918; Autun 1944; Forêt-Noire 1945; AFN 1952–1962
- Website: www.defense.gouv.fr/terre

Commanders
- Current commander: Lieutenant-Colonel Olivier Lion
- Notable commanders: Noël Bouton de Chamilly; Louis Henri, Duke of Bourbon; Emmanuel de Grouchy; François Macquart; Arnail François de Jaucourt; André Demetz

The 2nd Dragoon Regiment (French: 2^{e} régiment de dragons, 2^{e} RD) is the only NBC Defense Unit of the French Army, stationed at Fontevraud-l'Abbaye, by Saumur in Maine-et-Loire. The current regiment is an amalgamation of the old 2nd Dragoon Regiment and the groupe de défense NBC, which took effect in July 2005. It incorporates the capabilities of the previous 2nd Dragoons, which was specialised as a reconnaissance unit, in a new mission as the sole French Army unit dedicated to combatting chemical, biological, radiological, and nuclear (CBRN) weapons.

Despite the recent formation of the regiment in its current configuration, it is the oldest French cavalry regiment, dating back to 1556. The regiment found fame as the personal regiment of Louis, Duke of Enghien and later Prince of Condé, from 1635 to 1686; in honour of the "Grand Condé", it is still called the "Condé-Dragons". The French Revolution gave it the designation of the second regiment of dragoons in the French Army, and with brief interruptions it has served under this name in successive French armies ever since.

== History ==
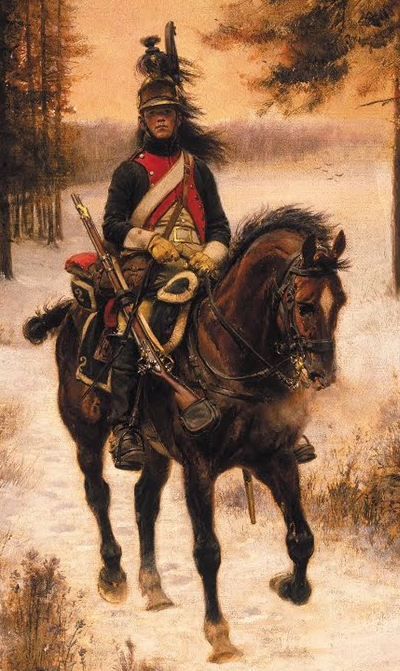
A detail of painting of a Napoleonic-era dragoon of the 2nd Dragoon Regiment by Édouard Detaille.

=== Ancien Régime ===
==== Origins and the Grand Condé ====
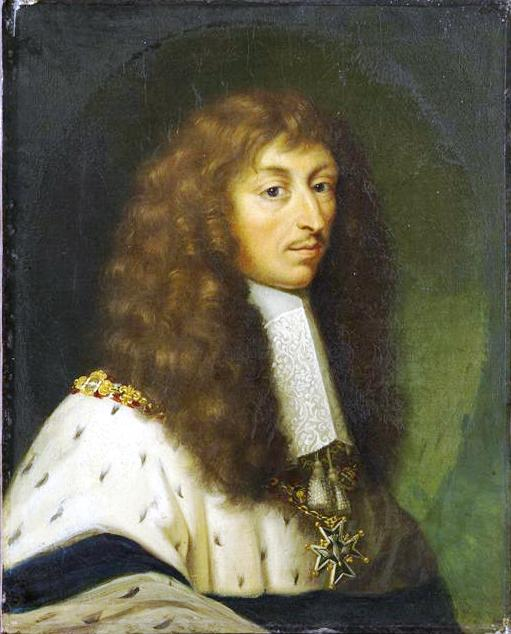
Louis, Grand Condé (1662)

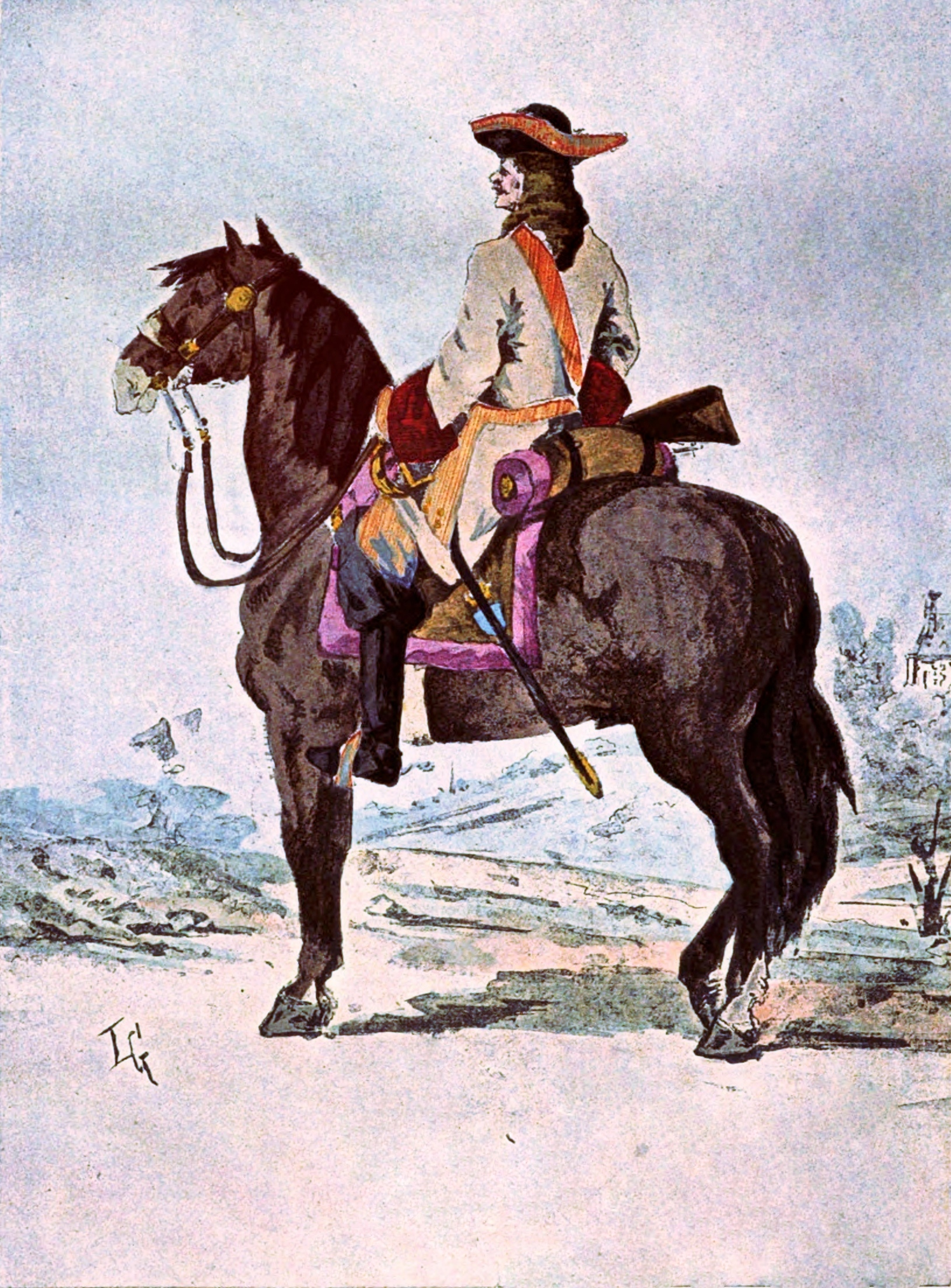
A cavalier of the Condé-Cavalerie in 1690

The 2nd Dragoons trace their lineage to the formation of a compagnie d'ordonnance by Louis de Bourbon, head of the House of Condé, in 1556. At the time it numbered 50 lances fournies—50 knights, plus about 5 supporting men-at-arms each, for a total of about 300 men. In 1635, this company became the Régiment d'Anguien-Cavalerie, after its proprietor Louis, Duke of Enghien (the future Grand Condé), one of twelve regiments formed by a royal order of 16 May to fight in the war against the Holy Roman Empire. Enghien appointed the Chevalier de Tavannes as the commander (mestre de camp) of the regiment. It immediately was sent to serve in the Italian peninsula, where it probably operated as a collection of independent light cavalry companies. In 1636, it was sent to join the French campaign against Franche-Comté, and it participated in the unsuccessful siege of Dôle that spring. It was reduced to independent companies in July 1636, and restored to a full regiment in January 1638.

Sent to fight in the Pyrenees in the war against Spain, the Anguien-Cavalerie participated in the unsuccessful Siege of Fuenterrabía, during which their commander de Tavannes was killed. Under its new commander the Marquis de Livry, the regiment fought in the successful Siege of Turin in 1640. Following the siege, the regiment helped take several towns in Piedmont for the French, and in 1641 it fought in the siege of Coni.

During 1642 to 1643, the regiment fought in the Reapers' War under Marshal Philippe de La Mothe-Houdancourt, helping gain large sections of the Principality of Catalonia for the French–Catalan alliance. It joined the Duke of Enghien in Germany in 1644, fighting at Freiburg, Philippsburg, Mainz, and Landau. At the Second Battle of Nördlingen on 3 August 1645, the Marquis de Livry was killed. The Marquis de Lanques replaced him, and under his command, the regiment was among those at the vain siege of Heilbronn and the successful capture of Trier. The regiment was sent to the siege of Dunkirk, where on 26 December 1646 it was renamed the Régiment de Condé-Cavalerie, after Enghien became Prince of Condé on the death of his father. The Condé-Cavalerie was sent to Catalonia for two years, while Prince Louis was assigned to command the French and Catalan forces, where it took part in the unsuccessful second siege of Lleida.

==== Fronde and exile ====
In early 1649, the regiment was called to join the blockade of Paris as part of the First Fronde, a rebellion of the French parliament and a section of the nobles, including the Prince of Condé. Little blood was shed in the resolution of the First Fronde, but the outbreak of the Second Fronde meant that the regiment was sent into battle against royalist forces again in early 1650, having moved to Berry. After the Prince of Condé reconciled with Cardinal Mazarin and the royal faction in February 1651, the regiment returned to the royal army. This only lasted until September, when the Prince of Condé was forced to flee France. He became a high commander in the Spanish army, and his regiment of cavalry fought for him as part of Spanish and Lombard forces. During this time, the Prince of Condé commissioned Noël Bouton de Chamilly, later Marshal of France, into his regiment; he served as its mestre de camp lieutenant in 1667–1682.

==== Return to royal service ====
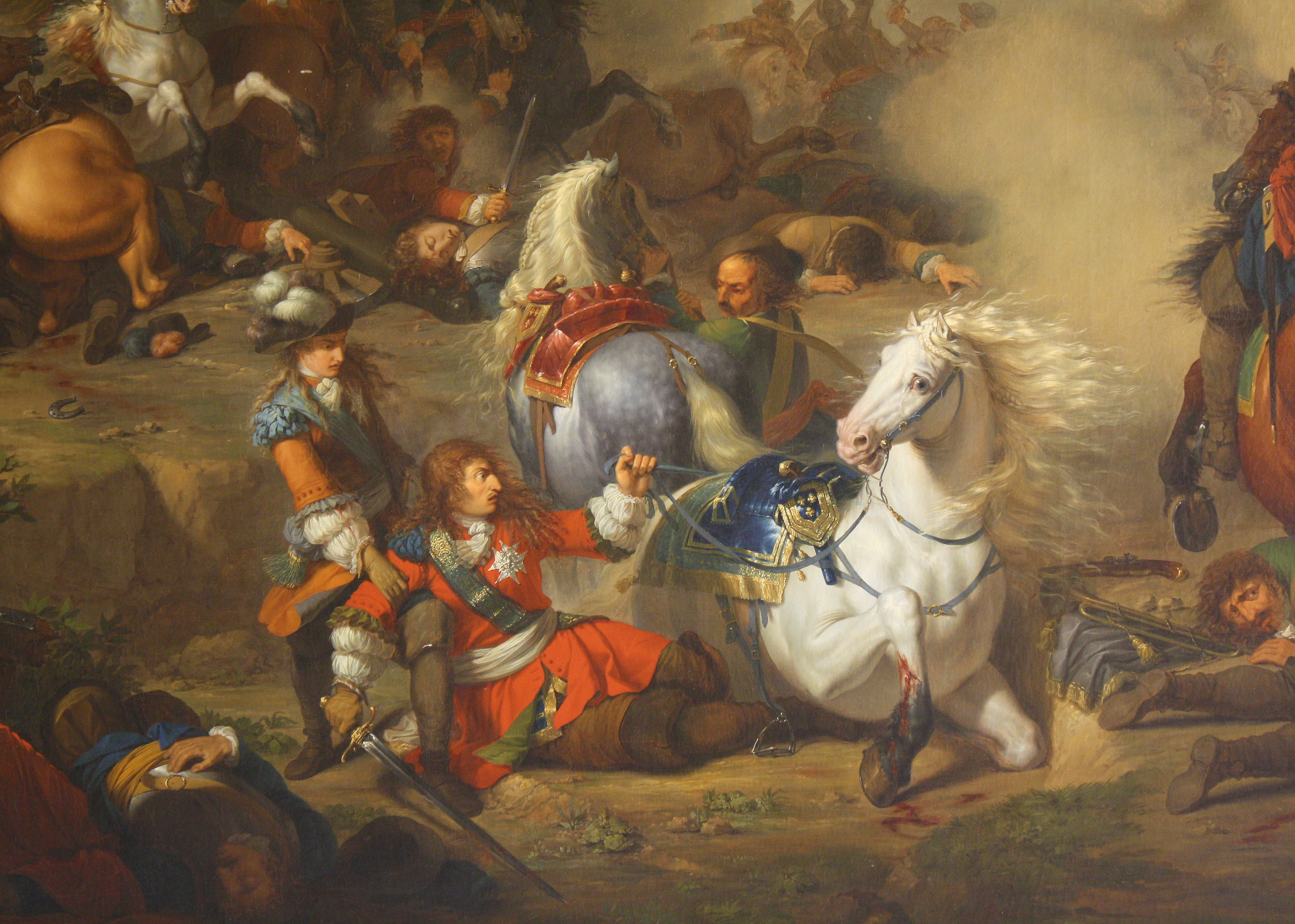
A painting by Bénigne Gagneraux depicting Henri Jules, Duke of Enghien saving his father, the Grand Condé, at the Battle of Seneffe (1674)—a victory in which the Condé-Cavalerie were crucial, and which brought Condé back into royal favour

The regiment returned to royal service on 7 November 1659, following the Treaty of the Pyrenees, reduced to a single "colonel's company", belonging to the Prince of Condé. The full regiment was reinstated in December 1665, and in 1667 the regiment took part in the French invasion of the Low Countries as part of the War of Devolution. In 1668 the regiment, now nine companies strong, was part of the Prince of Condé's incursion into Franche-Comté. In May 1668, the regiment was once again reduced to the colonel's company, until the 1671 reorganisation of the cavalry.

The regiment was sent to fight in the Dutch War in 1672, taking up winter quarters near Utrecht. It fought in the Siege of Maastricht of June 1673. On 11 August 1674, the regiment had a leading role in the Battle of Seneffe, a victory won by the Grand Condé which restored him to royal favour. In 1675 the regiment took Dinant, Huy, and Limbourg, and spent 1676 campaigning in the Saar valley and concluded the war fighting in the Battle of Kokersberg in 1677.

After being stationed in northern France in Artois and on the Saône, the regiment was sent to fight in Catalonia in the War of the Reunions, fighting along the river Ter and in Bernardin Gigault de Bellefonds' siege of Gerona. The Grand Condé died on 11 December 1688, leaving his princely title and regiments to his son Henri Jules. The regiment had been sent east already, where it fought in all the campaigns of the War of the League of Augsburg, in Flanders, on the Moselle, and on the Rhine. It fought with distinction at the Battle of Fleurus on 1 July 1690 and the Battle of Neerwinden on 29 July 1693, and fought in the 1697 siege of Ath, the final battle of the war.

==== After the Grand Condé ====
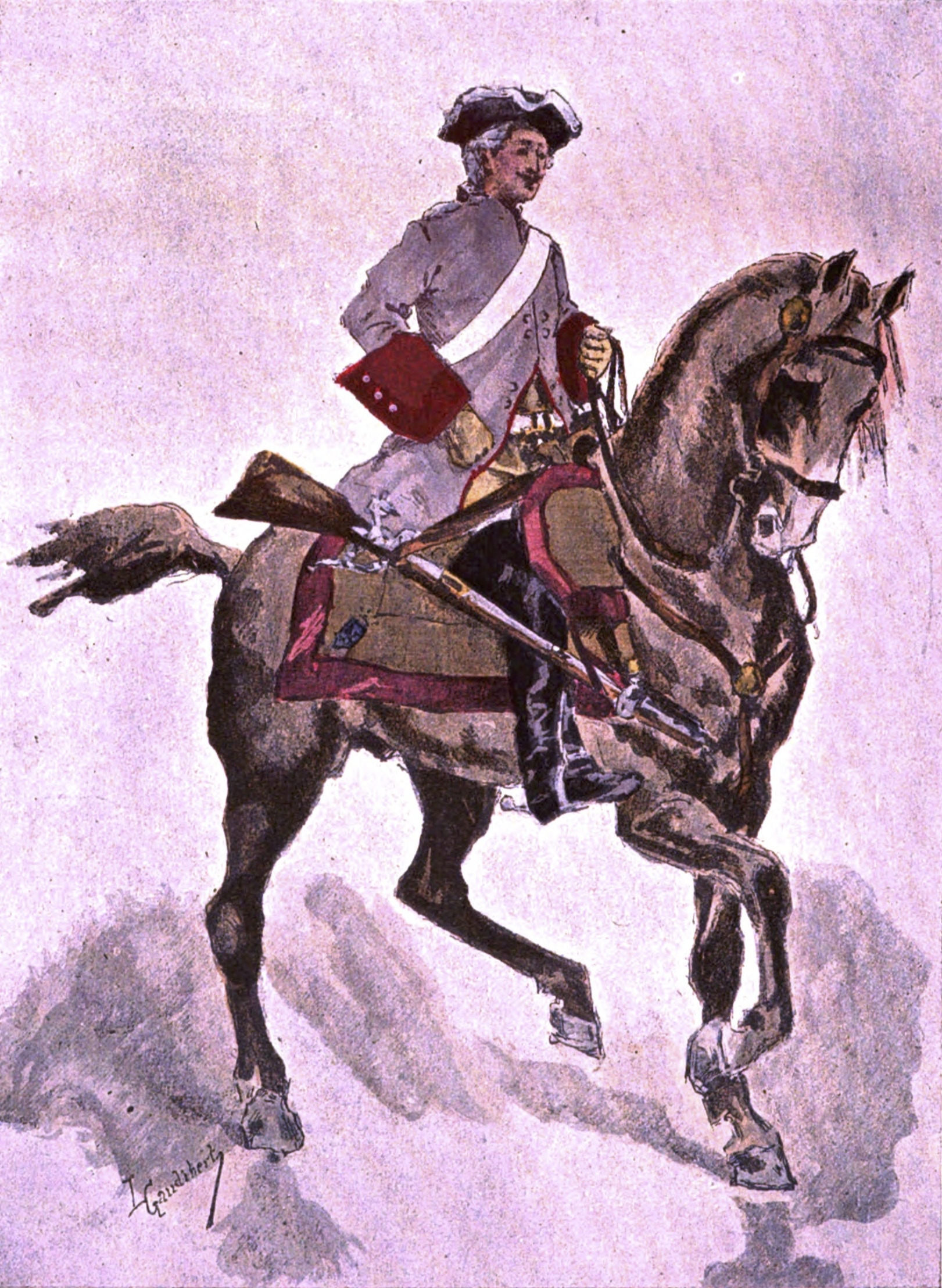
A cavalier of the Condé-Cavalerie in 1724

During the War of the Spanish Succession, the Condé-Cavalerie fought in the Flemish and Rhine campaigns of 1701, and was present during the Battle of Friedlingen in October 1702. In 1703, it fought at the Siege of Kehl and at the Battle of Hochstedt. In 1704, the regiment fought at the Battle of Blenheim, a disgraceful defeat for the French. It continued to fight in Flanders and the Rhine valley for the rest of the war. In 1709, title to the regiment passed to Louis Henri, Prince of Condé and Duke of Bourbon.

On the outbreak of the War of the Polish Succession in 1733, the Condé-Cavalerie was sent to the Rhine valley, where it fought at the sieges of Kehl and Philippsburg, and the battles of Ettlingen and Clausen. After the war, the regiment was based in Brittany, with its main center of operations at Lamballe. During this time, the regiment passed to Louis Joseph, Prince of Condé on the death of Louis Henri in 1740.

In the early years of the War of the Austrian Succession, the regiment served in Westphalia, Bavaria, and Bohemia until its return to France in July 1743. It was then sent to Alsace to serve as part of Marshal François de Franquetot de Coigny's army, overwintering at Dijon before being sent to the garrison of Belfort. It then participated in the taking of Wissembourg, and in the defense of the lines of the Lauter, and then the takings of Augenheim and Philippsburg. After overwintering in Pontarlier, the regiment was part of the taking of Kronembourg near Strasbourg in 1745. Called to Flanders in 1746, it figured in the siege of Mons and the battle of Rocoux. It fought in the battle of Lauffeld in 1747, and the siege of Maastricht in 1748, at the end of the war.

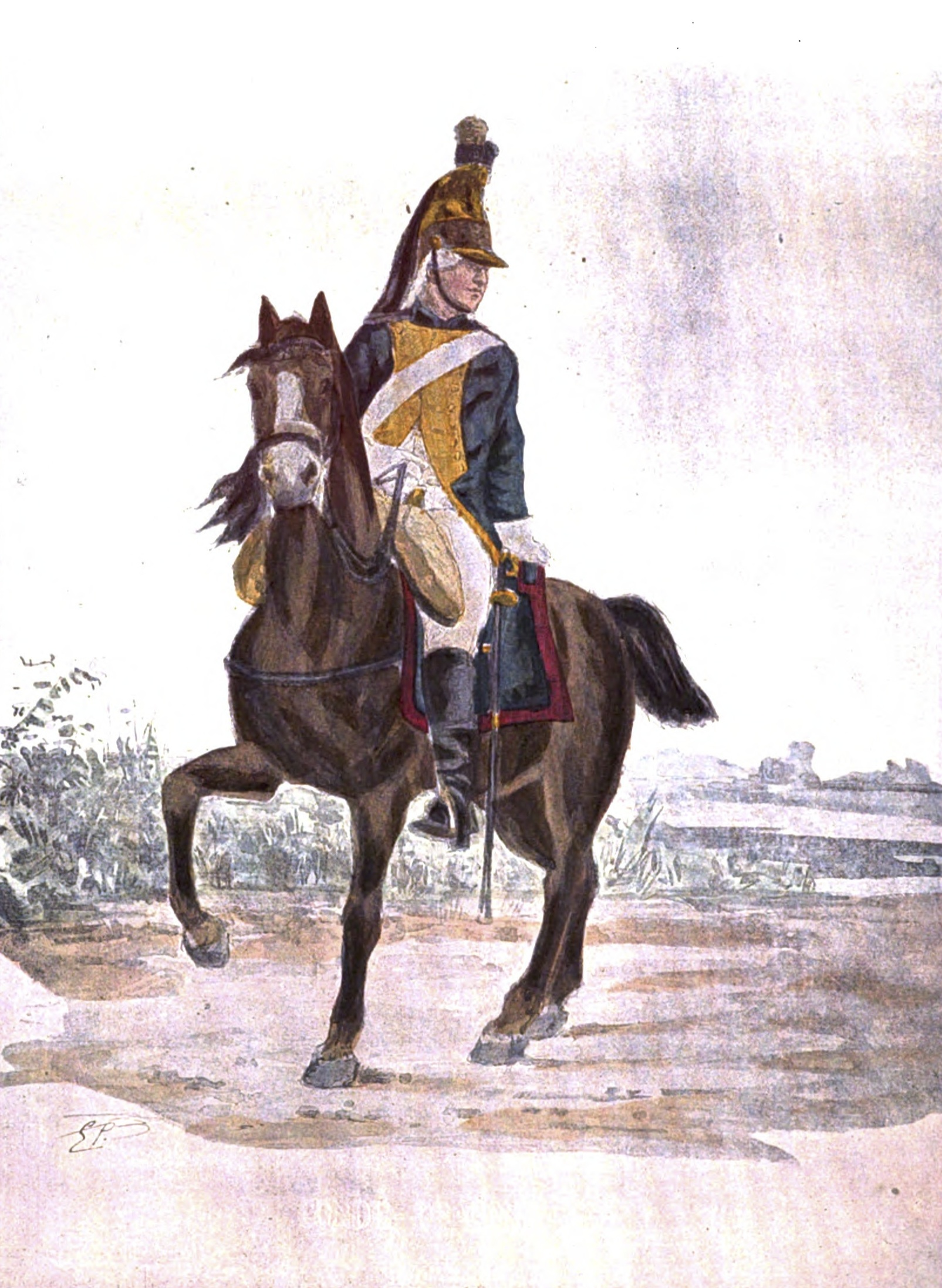
A dragoon of the Condé-Dragons in 1786

Following the War of the Austrian Succession, the regiment was stationed in various towns in northern and eastern France and Westphalia. During the Seven Years' War, the Condé-Cavalerie served in Germany under Marshals Louis d'Estrées and Charles de Rohan-Soubise. In 1757, they fought at the Battle of Hastenbeck on 26 July, and the Battle of Rossbach on 5 November, where the French were resoundingly defeated by an inferior force but the Condé-Cavalerie were praised for their steadfastness. At the Battle of Krefeld on 23 June 1758, the men of the regiment fought fiercely, and helped put up a strong fighting retreat after the French defeat.

After 1762, the regiment continued to be moved between garrisons mostly in the north and east of France, until the Revolution. At Lille in March 1763, the Condé-Cavalerie was reorganised, partly through the incorporation of the former Régiment de Toulouse-Lautrec into it. The brilliant colonel of that regiment, the Count of Toulouse-Lautrec, had previously been chosen to serve as the mestre de camp lieutenant of the Condé-Cavalerie. While based at Hesdin in 1776, the regiment was designated as a unit of dragoons, the Régiment de Condé-Dragons, a name which still is the nickname of the regiment today. At the same time the 3rd Squadron of the Chasseurs de la Legion de Lorraine was incorporated into its ranks.

=== Revolutionary Wars ===
When the French Revolution began, the colonel of the Condé-Dragons was François Jaucourt, who favoured the revolution and ended up joining the moderate Feuillant faction. On 31 August 1791, the regiment was one of the regular units called upon to suppress the Nancy Mutiny. On 1 January 1792, all the regiments of the French Army were given numbers in place of the names of their aristocratic patrons. The Condé-Dragons were designated the second-most senior dragoon regiment, and became the 2^{e} régiment de dragons, even though they had been the eleventh-most senior dragoon regiment prior. Around this time, Jaucourt went into exile and command of the regiment briefly passed to Colonel Emmanuel de Grouchy, a future Marshal of France.

With the outbreak of the War of the First Coalition in 1792, the 2nd Dragoons were assigned to the Army of the Centre. After participating in the defeat of the Prussian Army in a number of small actions and then at the Battle of Valmy on 20 September, they were assigned to the Army of the Ardennes. The 2nd Dragoons were reported to have fought brilliantly at the Battle of Neerwinden on 13 March 1793, but owing to the lack of training of most of the French infantry, the battle was a defeat and resulted in the loss of the Low Countries by France. That year the regiment also fought at Wattignies and Cholet.

Following the Flanders campaign, the 2nd Dragoons were sent to put down the revolt in the Vendée in late 1793. After seeing service in the Vendée, the regiment was given garrison duties, and was probably split into two detachments, one in Douai and the other in west-central France. In late 1795, the 2nd Dragoons were assigned to the Army of Sambre-et-Meuse, which was being prepared for a crossing of the Rhine the following year. At the time, the regiment was recorded having the strength of 485 horses. The regiment distinguished themselves in the campaign of 1796, particularly at the Battle of Siegburg in June and the taking of Bamberg in August. In 1797, the regiment was made part of the Army of the West and then the Army of Mainz.

At the start of the War of the Second Coalition in 1798, the 2nd Dragoon Regiment fought in southwestern Germany as part of the Army of the Danube. In 1799, it fought in the Second Battle of Zurich, earning itself a battle honour. In 1800, the regiment was part of the Army of the Rhine, in Marshal Laurent de Gouvion Saint-Cyr's Centre Corps, fighting at the battles of Biberach and Hohenlinden. From 1801 to 1805, the regiment was stationed at towns in the Flanders region and Picardy.

=== Napoleonic Wars ===
==== Early victories ====
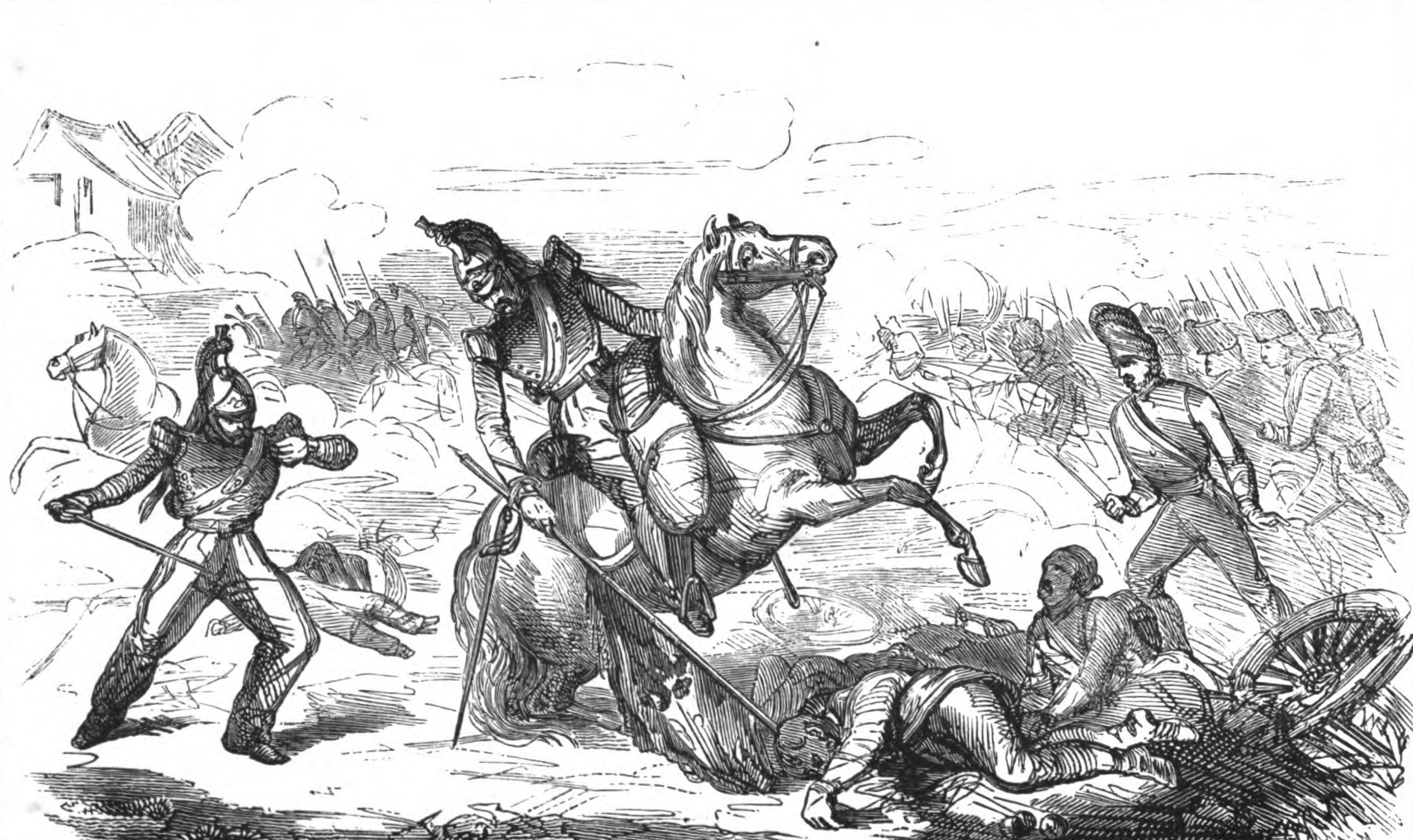
Maréchal-de-logis Humbert and Dragoon Fauveau taking a Prussian officer prisoner at the Battle of Jena. Both were awarded the Legion d'honneur after the battle.

In 1805 the 2nd Dragoon Regiment was made part of the 1st Dragoon Division (commanded by General of Division Louis Klein) of Marshal Joachim Murat's Reserve Cavalry Corps in the Grande Armée of Napoleon I. The First Empire gave them scarlet as their distinguishing colour on their facings and coat lapels, which they shared with the 1st through 6th Dragoons. In the autumn of 1805, the regiment and the rest of Klein's division was part of the remarkably successful Ulm Campaign, fighting at the battles of Wertingen and Albeck on 8 and 11 October, at the Battle of Ulm a week later, and at the Battle of Austerlitz on 20 November.

During the War of the Fourth Coalition, the regiment fought at the Battle of Jena on 14 October 1806, the Battle of Golymin on 26 December that year, the Battle of Eylau on 7–8 February 1807 (including Marshal Murat's colossal cavalry charge), the Battle of Heilsberg on 10 June, and the eventual victory at the Battle of Friedland on 14 June.

==== Peninsular War ====
From 1808 to 1813, the regiment and the rest of the 1st Dragoon Division (now under General of Division Victor Latour-Mabourg) along with much of the Reserve Cavalry Corps (under Jean-Baptiste Bessières) served in the Peninsular Campaign. There, they fought many small skirmishes with the Spanish, and saw action in several major battles. They began their campaign at the First Siege of Zaragoza in the summer of 1808, followed by the Battle of Tudela on 23 November. In 1809, they fought in the Battle of Uclés on 13 January, the Battle of Medellín on 28 March, the Battle of Talavera on 27–28 July, and the Battle of Almonacid on 11 August. On 27 September 1810, the 2nd Dragoon Regiment fought at the Battle of Bussaco, in 1811 it fought at the Battle of Chiclana on 5 March and the siege of Elvas later that year, and on 21 June 1813 it fought in the Battle of Vitoria. A small detachment served in the French invasion of Russia in 1812 as part of Marshal Pierre Augereau's reserve XI Corps.

==== Fall of Napoleon ====
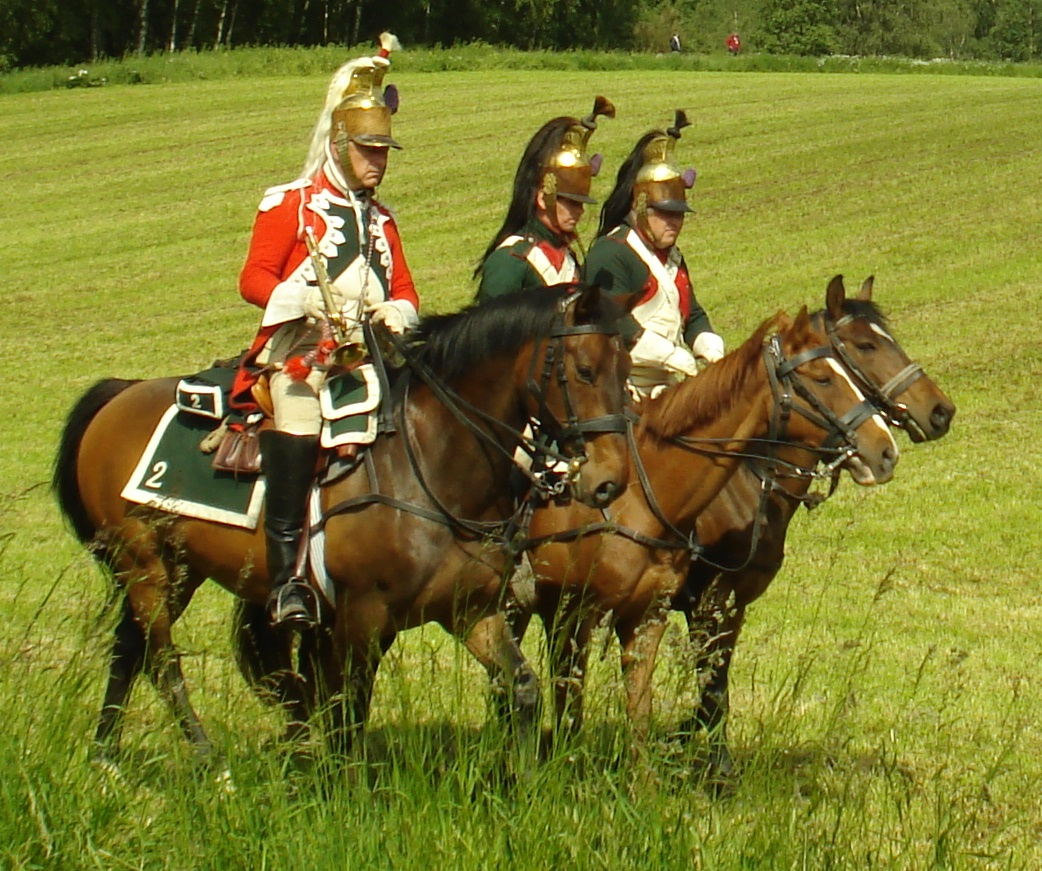
Historical reenactors wearing the Napoleonic-era uniform of the 2nd Dragoon Regiment, including a trumpeter with reversed colour.

The regiment joined in the German Campaign of 1813. It fought in the siege of Königsberg, the Battle of Leipzig of 16–19 October, and the Battle of Hanau of 30–31 October. In late 1813 it was assigned to the French corps d'observation in Bavaria, and then the V Corps when the corps was sent to reinforce the garrison of Danzig, then under a siege by a Russo-Prussian army. During the Campaign of France in early 1814, the 2nd Dragoon Regiment fought in an action at Rambervillers, at the Battle of Brienne on 29 January, and at the Battle of Saint-Dizier on 26 March. That year, the regiment incorporated 25 survivors from the Compagnie des Guides-interprètes (the predecessors of the later French corps of Interprètes Militaires or military interpreters), which was first formed at Boulogne in 1803 in preparation for Napoleon's planned invasion of the United Kingdom.

==== Hundred Days and Restorations ====
On the return of the regiment from Germany in 1814 following the First Bourbon Restoration, it went to Paris and received the title of dragons du Roi, as the most senior regiment of dragoons (the previous 1st Dragoon Regiment now was a regiment of chevau-légers lanciers). Following Napoleon's return to France, it returned to its previous name and number on 23 April 1815. During the Hundred Days, the regiment was initially part of the 4th Reserve Cavalry Division. In the Army of the North's Belgian campaign, it was part of the 11th Cavalry Division, in Marshal François Étienne de Kellermann's III Reserve Cavalry Corps. During the retreat following the battle of Waterloo, the 2nd Dragoons attacked and defeated a Prussian force in a skirmish at Sentis. After Napoleon's surrender, it joined the many units camped out in the Loire valley while a new settlement between the coalition and the Bourbons was made. The regiment was dissolved on 4 December 1815, after the Second Bourbon Restoration.

=== Bourbon Restoration and July Monarchy ===
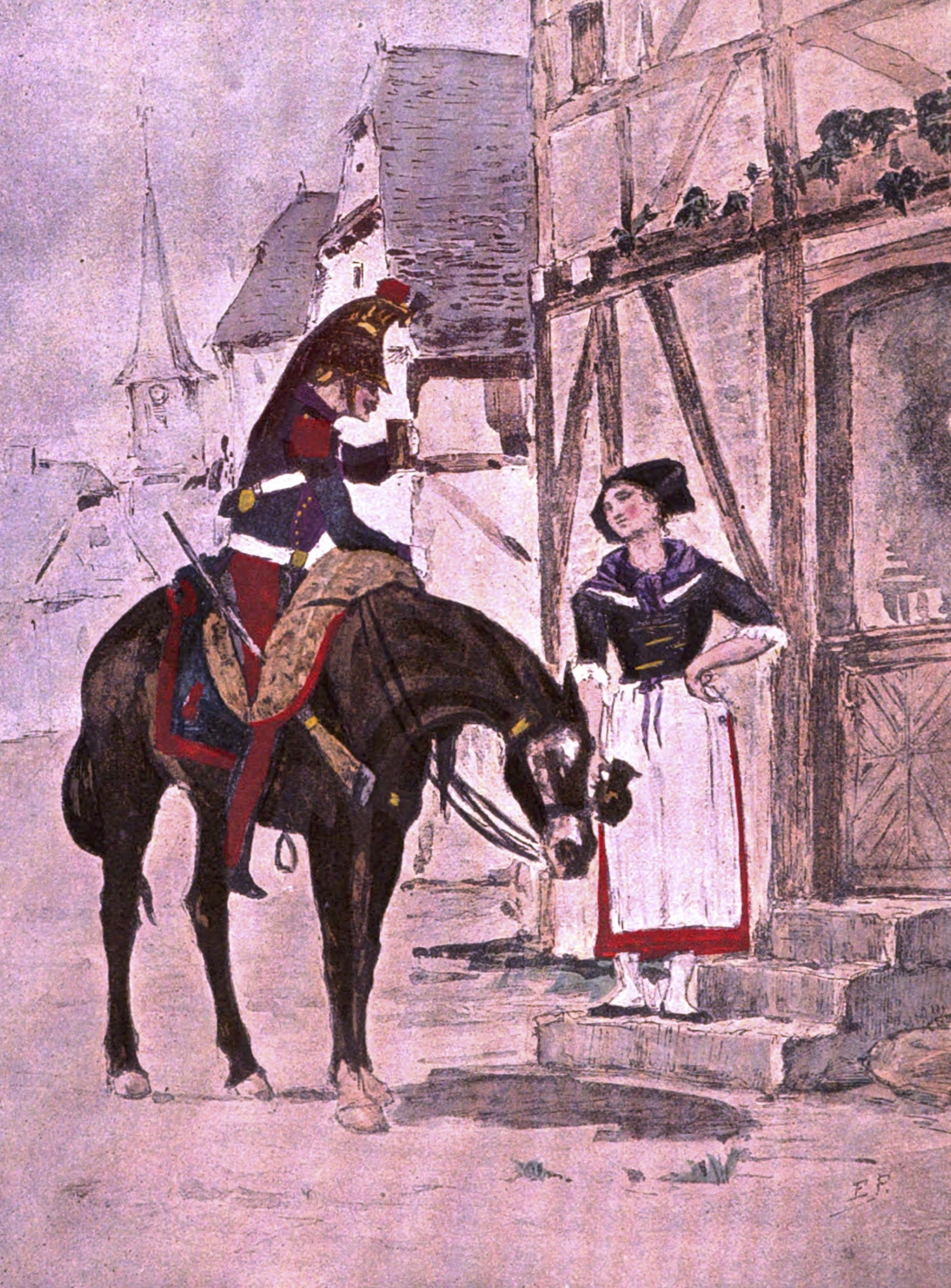
A dragoon of the 2nd Dragoon Regiment in 1838

On 29 December 1815, the regiment was re-formed with the same men and officers, and named the régiment de dragons du Doubs, again the second-most senior dragoon regiment. The dragons de Doubs were given a new uniform and headgear, with scarlet facings and green cuffs as their distinguishing colours. The men of the regiment remained openly sympathetic to Bonapartism, including its first commander after the Restoration, Colonel François-Joseph Planzeaux, who gave a speech at his first review of the regiment praising the deeds of the "2nd Dragoons of the Empire, a regiment beyond reproach...the immortal dragoons of Spain." In 1816, Planzeaux was accused of participating in a Bonapartist conspiracy and discharged from the army.

In 1823, the regiment was part of the Spanish Expedition (known as the "Hundred Thousand Sons of Saint Louis"), the French force sent to defeat the liberals of the Trienio Liberal and restore the absolute power of Ferdinand VII. It was part of General of Division Bertrand Castex's 1st Dragoon Division, in Marshal Nicolas Oudinot's I Corps.

During the July Monarchy, the 2nd Dragoon Regiment dropped the name Doubs, and was among several that were favoured by Louis Philippe I, and called to the maneuvers and festivities at his camp at Compiègne every two years. In 1832, it participated in the suppression of the June Rebellion. Charles-Marie-Augustin de Goyon, who would be a senior general of the Second Empire, served as its colonel from 1846 to 1850. Under de Goyon, the regiment earned the nickname of "demoiselles de Goyon", owing to his high standards for drill and dress. During the 1848 Revolution, the officers of the regiment kept their men calm and disciplined, much to the relief of the citizens of its garrison town of Beauvais.

=== Second Republic and Second Empire ===
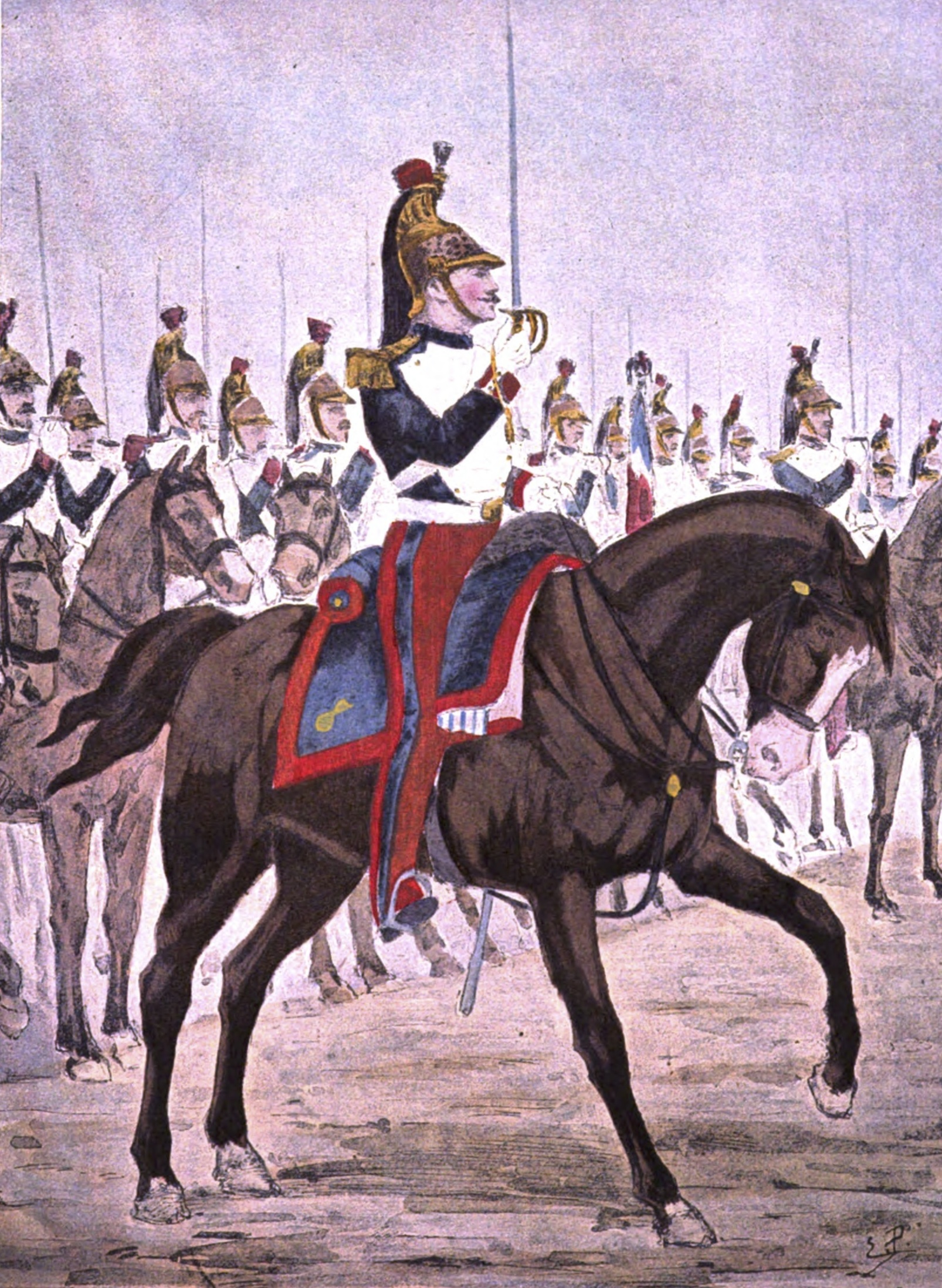
The 2nd Dragoon Regiment in 1853

Following the establishment of the Second Republic, the regiment was ordered to Paris in May. There it helped protect the new government from working-class revolutionaries during the seizure of the Palais Bourbon in May and the June Days Uprising. During the Second French Empire, the 2nd Dragoon Regiment was given orange as a distinguishing colour, until all of the dragoon regiments lost their distinguishing colours in 1862. In January 1854, while the Crimean War was ongoing, a detachment of half a squadron of the 2nd Dragoons was sent to the Kingdom of Greece, where it attempted to control the local "bandits" for about a year. In 1865, Baron Joachim Ambert was appointed the colonel of the regiment, a role in which he served until 1873.

During the Franco-Prussian War of 1870, the regiment was part of the 2nd Brigade of General of Division Georges Eugène Blanchard's III Corps. After its arrival at the front on 8 August, it protected baggage trains in the retreat to Metz following the Battle of Forbach-Spicheren, before serving in a reconnaissance role, and facing the Prussians at the battles of Borney–Colombey, Mars-la-Tour, and Noiseville. Most of the regiment was briefly taken prisoner by the Prussians on 29 October.

Following the defeat of the Second Empire, the remaining troops of the regular army were called upon by the Government of National Defense to the defense of Paris from the Prussian siege, but they were scattered and disorganised, and had to be organised into provisional regiments (regiments de marche). The troops who had not been captured, including the depot and a squadron of new recruits, were in the 4th and 6th dragoon and 11th mixed cavalry regiments de marche. By the time a peace with Prussia was reached in May 1871, most of the 2nd Dragoon Regiment's complement was gathered together, as the 2nd dragoon regiment de marche, and was called upon to aid in the government's suppression of the Paris Commune.

=== Belle Époque ===
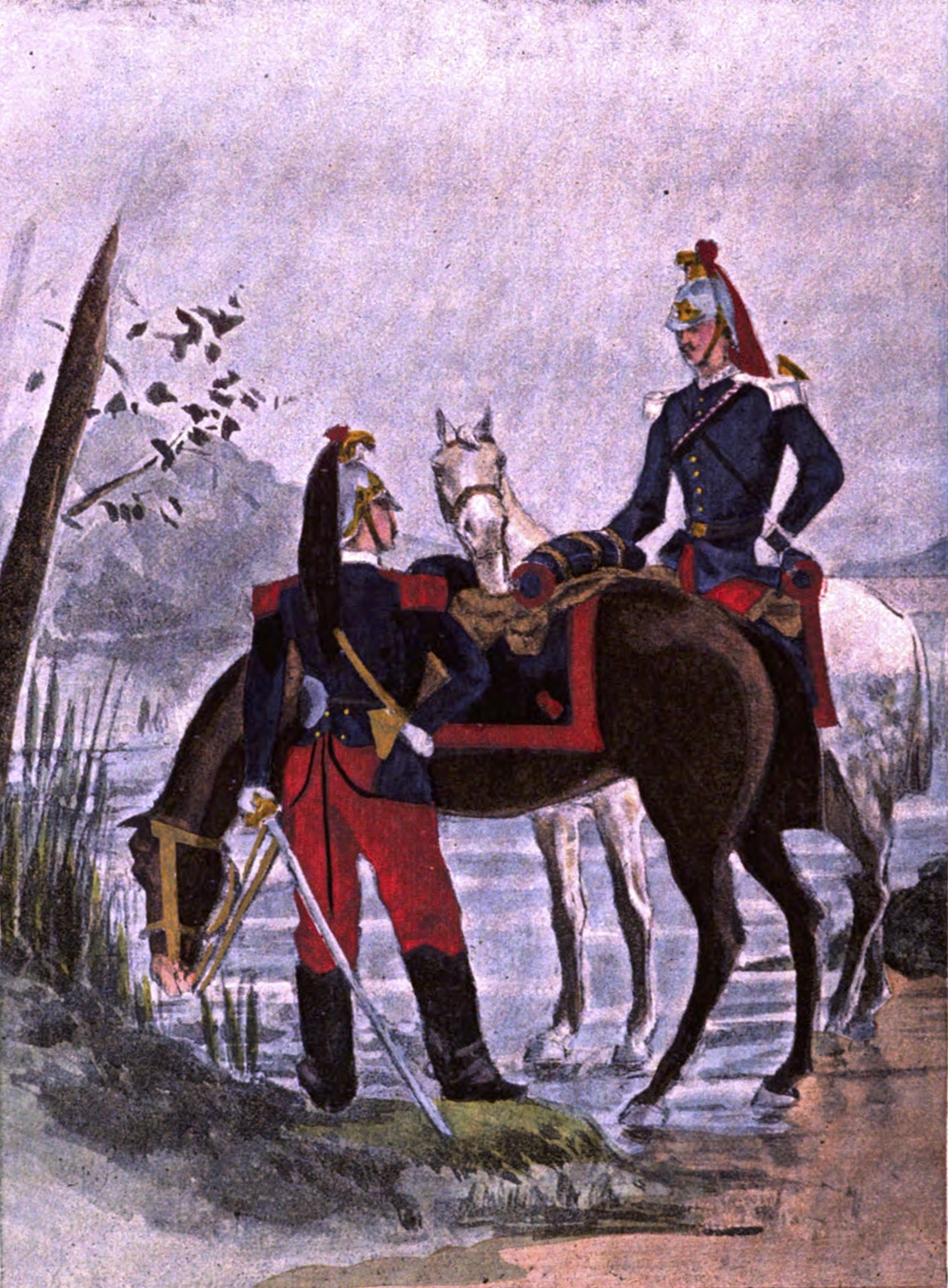
A trumpeter and NCO of the 2nd Dragoon Regiment in 1873

During the Belle Époque era of the Third Republic, between 1871 and the start of war in 1914, the regiment was based in Chartres, and then Lyon.

=== World War I ===
At the start of World War I, the regiment was based in Lyon. In early September 1914, it fought in the counteroffensive of the Charmes Gap in the Battles of the Frontiers. From mid-October to 2 November, it fought in the First Battle of Ypres. In September 1915, it fought in the Second Battle of Champagne. In 1917, it fought at the Second Battle of the Aisne. In March 1918, it participated in the Battle of the Lys.

=== Interbellum ===
In 1930, the regiment was designated a mechanised infantry regiment (with companies of motorcyclists, sidecars, and half-tracks), and renamed the 2nd Motorised Dragoon Battalion (2^{e} bataillon de dragons portés).

=== World War II ===
==== Phony War and Battle of France ====
On 1 December 1939, the unit was redesignated as the 2nd Motorised Dragoon Regiment, with two battalions. During the early stages of the war, they made up the 13th Light Mechanised Brigade, along with the 3e régiment d'automitrailleuses. In February 1940, this brigade was attached to the 3rd Light Cavalry Division, in the Third Army. The first battalion was stationed at Russange and the second at Rédange. After the German invasion of Luxembourg began on 9 May, the 2nd Dragoon Regiment and the rest of the 3rd Light Cavalry Division briefly entered into Luxembourg on 10 May in an attempt to slow the Germans by destroying key infrastructure.

During the Battle of France, the regiment fought in the attempts to slow the German advance from 24 to 31 May and from 5–7 June, including at the Battle of Abbeville. It was in a fighting retreat until 17 June.

==== Vichy France and escape ====
After France surrendered on 22 June, the regiment's survivors were brought together at Auch in Gers department in August 1940, by the army of the Vichy government then ruling southern France. The men were formed into two horse-mounted squadrons, three squadrons of cyclists, an armoured car squadron, a signals platoon, and a fanfare. Much of their heavier weaponry was well-camouflaged, and hidden whenever Vichy officials or German officers were in the area, as it was officially forbidden for the Vichy military. Their commander, Colonel Guy Schlesser, was determined they would still have some role to play in defending France. By his speeches and pamphlets, and his encouragement of skiing (at a dedicated chalet near Campan) and a wide range of sports and other recreation, he kept morale high. Generals sent to inspect the regiment expressed their admiration at its high level of organisation.

In late November 1942, Germany began to occupy southern France, under Operation Anton. On 27 November, Germany ordered the dissolution of the Vichy army. The 2nd Dragoon Regiment was officially disbanded on 29 November 1942 by its superior officer General Louis Gustave Bérard, commander of the 17th Military Region. At the ceremony of farewell to the regimental standard, Colonel Schlesser gave a dramatic speech in which he proclaimed that "despite [his] determination to resist" he was forced "with tears in [his] eyes and heart full of bitterness, to obey". After the ceremony he gathered together some officers and non-commissioned officers and made plans to escape the Germans and continue to fight. At Schlesser's instigation, nearly all of the officers and soldiers of the 2nd Dragoons decided to escape and rejoin the fight against Germany, whether by heading for North Africa to join the Free French Army or joining the Resistance. Although many of the men who headed for North Africa were delayed by imprisonment in neutral Spain, most of them eventually were released and transported to Casablanca by Free French merchant vessels.

Some men who remained in the Resistance ended up creating the center of resistance in Gers department, while others formed independent cells in the mountains and hid some of the weaponry of the regiment in mines. The standard of the regiment was hidden in the village of La Romieu, and when Schlesser made plans to re-form the regiment in 1943, he had Captain Robert de Neuchèze, who had remained in the Resistance, bring it to Algiers. He embarked the submarine Aréthuse on 29 September at Ramatuelle, and managed to reach Algiers still carrying the standard of the regiment. In 1945, the same standard was decorated with the Médaille des évadés, a decoration created in 1926 for individual soldiers who made a successful escape from enemies or at least two unsuccessful attempts. The 2nd Dragoons remain the only French military unit ever to receive this decoration. This standard is now in the Musée de l'Armée in Paris.

==== Revival in the Free French Army ====
On 7 November 1943, plans to revive the 2nd Dragoons in the Free French Army were finalised and the regiment was designated as a tank destroyer unit; it was re-formed on 21 December 1943, at Sfax, Tunisia. At a ceremony attended by a number of senior French and Allied officers, General Henri Giraud formally returned the regiment's standard, to its new commander, Lieutenant Colonel de Sauzey. The regiment incorporated men from the 2nd and 6th Algerian Spahis, nearly three full squadrons from the former. This was the first time large numbers of French colonial natives had joined a cavalry regiment from metropolitan France. Once the regiment arrived in France, many of its men who had fought in the Resistance rejoined.

The regiment was equipped with M20 Scout Cars. In May 1944, Lieutenant Colonel André Demetz was appointed to command the regiment. He was a specialist in armoured warfare, whose philosophy was that the way his men treated their equipment (similarly to the way mounted cavalrymen treated their horse) showed their ability. He began the practice of naming all the vehicles of the regiment, after places in Paris; for example, the colonel's vehicle is named after Paris itself, the most prominent armoured vehicles are named after monuments such as the Louvre and Arc-de-Triomphe, and the regiment's trucks are named after working class banlieues like Pantin and Billancourt. The regiment embarked in Mers-el-Kebir and Oran on 25 August, and spent five days in the crossing to Provence, during which Colonel Schlesser radioed in an encouraging message.

==== Liberation of France ====
On 30 August, the 2nd Dragoon Regiment debarked in Provence, and headed to Eyguières. The regiment was immediately assigned to a battle group that captured Montpellier, and formed General Jean de Lattre de Tassigny's escort when he entered the city on 2 September. On 4 September, the regiment began advancing north towards Lyon, attached to the 2nd Army Corps. Covering the left flank of the Corps, it reached Paray-le-Monial, where it met the 8th Dragoon Regiment of the French Forces of the Interior, which from then served as its infantry support. From 8 to 10 September, the regiment fought in the capture of Autun, meeting fierce resistance from German troops. There they took several casualties, including Chef d'escadrons de Neuchèze. On 10–11 September, the regiment linked up at Saulieu with U.S. troops who had landed in Normandy, the 86th Cavalry Reconnaissance Squadron (Mechanized) (part of the 6th Armored Division).

During October, the 2nd Dragoon Regiment fought in the campaigns of the Vosges and Doubs, reaching Saint-Loup-sur-Semouse on 30 October, where it was allowed to rest. In mid-November, it was called upon to join the advance toward Belfort and Mulhouse as part of the 2nd Moroccan Infantry Division. By 24 November, it had reached the area of Réchésy, where it acted rapidly to destroy German tanks and to cut off the communications of the 1st SS Panzer Division Leibstandarte SS Adolf Hitler to allow the French Army to capture Mulhouse. During December and until 20 January, the regiment was positioned defensively around Mulhouse. On 20 January, it was part of the initial French advance against the southern flank of the Colmar Pocket. They were engaged in this offensive, suffering heavy casualties, until its success with the capture of Cernay, in which some elements of the regiment participated. After this, the regiment rested at Masevaux, where Demetz was replaced by Colonel Clerck at the head of the regiment.

==== Invasion of Germany ====
On 1 April 1945, the regiment destroyed German bunkers to cross the Rhine at Germersheim, and in the days that followed, it fought pockets of German troops around Weingarten entrenched in towns and armed with tanks and anti-tank weapons. On 16 April the 2nd Dragoon Regiment returned across the Rhine to attack the remaining German forces in the Black Forest. The 2nd Squadron joined the Groupement Lebel, which chased a German force through the Black Forest and as far as Konstanz, while the rest of the regiment cut off the northeast of the Black Forest around Freudenstadt and Schwenningen. When news came of the German surrender on 7 May, the squadrons of the regiment had reunited and were staying at Schloss Heiligenberg. In the months after the war, the regiment garrisoned the French zone in the occupation of Austria, at Innsbruck and Schwaz.

=== Post-war ===
In 1957 to 1961, the regiment fought in the Algerian War, losing 84 men. From 1961 to 1984, the regiment was garrisoned at Haguenau in Alsace; from 1977 to 1984 part of the 6th Armoured Division. From 1984 to 1997, it was based at Crépy-Couvron in Aisne department, Picardy. In 1997, the regiment moved to Fontevraud-l'Abbaye, a village by Saumur in Maine-et-Loire department. It served as an armoured reconnaissance regiment, using the AMX-30 and later the AMX Leclerc main battle tanks, the Véhicule de l'Avant Blindé, and the Véhicule Blindé Léger. It was part of the 8th Infantry Division until its dissolution in 1993, and then the 2nd Armored Division until 2005.

On 1 July 2005, the regiment amalgamated with the groupe de défense NBC. After the merger, the regiment briefly went by the name "2nd Dragoon Regiment – Nuclear, Biological and Chemical" (2^{e} régiment de dragons – nucléaire, biologique et chimique, 2^{e} RD-NBC), before reverting to the simple 2^{e} régiment de dragons. Since the merger in 2005, the regiment has been under the direct command of the Commandement des Forces Terrestres, the high command of the French Army.

In January 2015, soldiers of the regiment were deployed to Guinea to provide decontamination for medical personnel fighting the West African Ebola epidemic.

== Organisation ==
=== Personnel ===
As of 2013, the regiment was manned by 893 personnel divided into:

- 5 mixed reconnaissance and decontamination squadrons
- 1 command and logistics squadron
- 1 reserve squadron

There were 53 officers, 270 non-commissioned officers, 562 other ranks, and 8 civilians in the regiment.

=== Current equipment ===
Vehicles

- Véhicule de l'Avant Blindé NBC
- VLRA NBC
- TRM 10000 SDA (French: système de décontamination approfondi, thorough decontamination system)

== Role ==
The 2nd Dragoon Regiment is currently the sole unit of the French Army specialised in defending against chemical, biological, radiological, and nuclear (CBRN) weapons, although there also are French Air Force teams with CBRN defense capabilities. The regiment's personnel undergo their training at the Army's CBRN school, now located in Saumur. All members of the regiment are trained in decontamination, and upon completing this training, they may undergo training for CBRN reconnaissance and operating in a "light role team" (LRT). The regiment's most immediate role is seen as being ready to deal with terrorism on French soil, but its role extends to handling accidents at industrial facilities such as nuclear power plants, handling attacks on France during a war, assisting civil defence, and protecting French forces on operations. As well as being tasked with defending France, it has the capability to be deployed overseas if needed. From its base, the 2nd Dragoon Regiment runs Detecbio, a network of environmental monitoring sensors that can detect a variety of potential biological threats.

== Symbols ==
=== Standard ===
The standard of the modern 2nd Dragoon Regiment

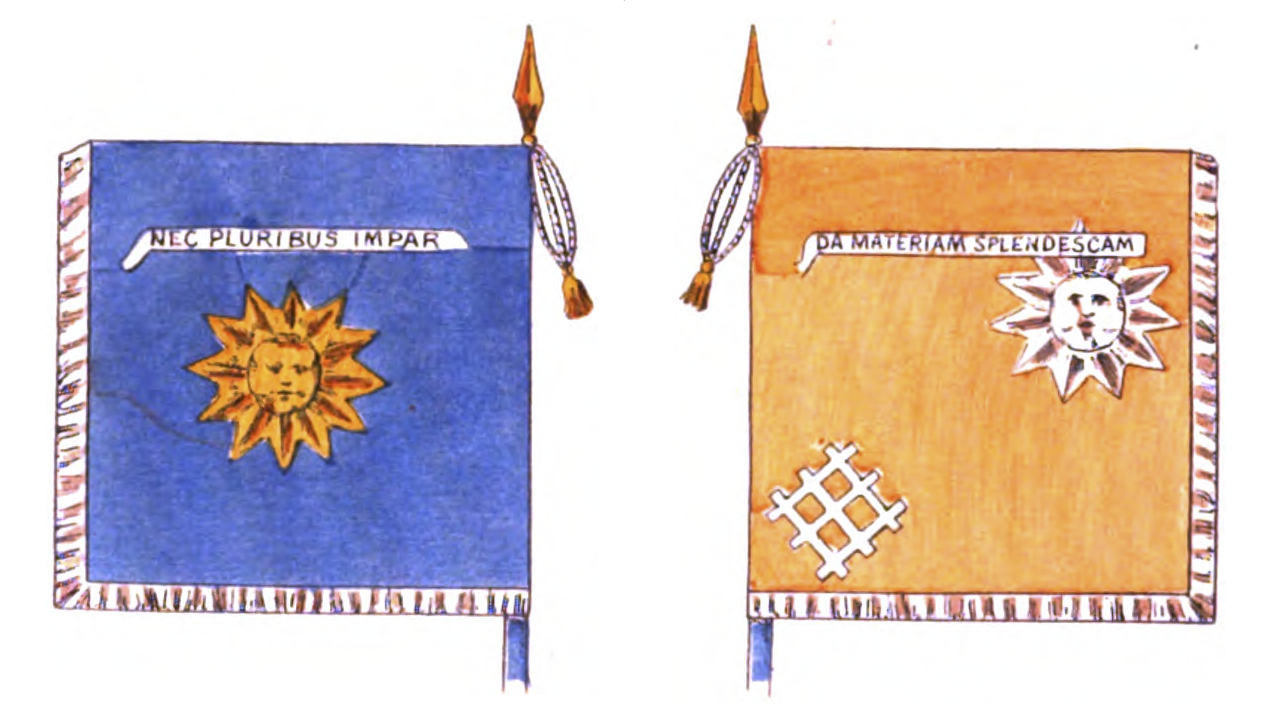
The two sides of the standard of the Condé-Cavalerie, 1740–1776

The regimental standard of the 2nd Dragoon Regiment is a French tricolor, with the following battle honours sewn on it in gold:

- Valmy 1792
- Zurich 1799
- Hohenlinden 1800
- Austerlitz 1805
- Iena 1806
- La Mortagne 1914
- Ypres 1914
- Flandres 1918
- Champagne 1918
- Autun 1944
- Forêt-Noire 1945
- AFN 1952–1962

The French Army does not retain any battle honours from before the Revolution; the battle honour AFN 1952–1962 for the Algerian War was only retained after some controversy.

Under the Ancien Régime, the Condé-Cavalerie had standards (guidons from 1776) that were blue, with the golden sun emblem of Louis XIV and the motto Nec pluribus impar, on one side; and fawn, with a silver sun lighting a pyre and the regimental motto Da materiam splendescam, on the other. The guidons were embroidered and fringed in silver.

=== Motto ===
The motto of the regiment under the Grand Condé, maintained by the current regiment, is "Da materiam splendescam", after the motto of the Grand Condé, "Splendescam da materiam." This translates to "Give me a chance to shine" or "Give me means, and I will shine".

=== Badge ===
The badge of the regiment consists of a black, winged dragon holding a guidon of the Condé-Cavalerie (showing the fawn side with the sun and pyre), on a blue background. At the bottom is inscribed "Condé Dragons".

== Decorations ==
The regiment has been awarded the following decorations:

- Croix de guerre 1914–1918 with two palms and two vermeil stars
- Croix de guerre 1939–1945 with two palms
- Médaille des évadés (Escapees' Medal)

Because of the regiment's decoration with the World War I Croix de guerre, all serving members of the 2nd Dragoon Regiment wear fourragères in green with red stripes on their uniforms.
