= Orange Brunt =

American politician

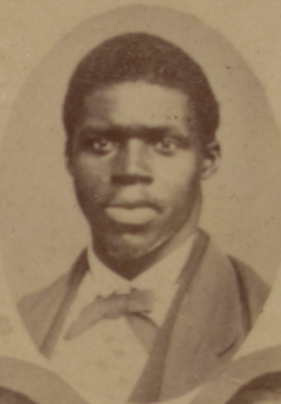
Photograph of Orange Brunt in 1874 by E. Von Seutter

Orange Brunt was an American state legislator in Mississippi. He served in the Mississippi House of Representatives from 1874 to 1875 representing Panola County. He had a wife named Thursday and children.

In November 1873, the Memphis Daily Appeal lamented his election. Still, it reassured that he and Dan Matthews were not "vicious Negroes". An October 25, 1875 news brief in The Clarion-Ledger described him as a Radical Republican and stated that he withdrew his candidacy (presumably for re-election) due to a "game" planned by Republican Party leaders and Urbain Ozanne, a sheriff in Panola County who tried to rein in Ku Klux Klan violence and murders. This ended up being the Mississippi Plan, a Southern Democrat strategy in 1875, whereby the involved parties would use threats and violence to eliminate African American voters and restore white supremacy.

== See also ==
- African American officeholders from the end of the Civil War until before 1900
