= Urbano =

Urbano may refer to:

- Urbano (album), a 2002 album by Elvis Crespo
- Urbano music, an umbrella term for certain genres of Latin music

== People with the given name ==
- Urbano José Allgayer (born 1924), Brazilian prelate of the Roman Catholic Church
- Urbano Santos da Costa Araújo (1859–1922), Brazilian politician
- Urbano Antillón (born 1982), Mexican-American professional boxer in the Lightweight division
- Urbano Barberini (1664–1722), Italian nobleman of the House of Barberini
- Urbano Barberini (born 1961), Italian actor
- Urbano Caldeira (1890–1933), athlete, coach, and manager of the Santos Futebol Clube
- Urbano Cairo (born 1957), Italian businessman and chairman of Torino Football Club
- Urbano García Alonso (born 1965), Spanish journalist
- Urbano Navarrete Cortés (1920–2010), Italian professor of Canon Law
- Urbano Lazzaro (1924–2006), Italian resistance fighter who played an important role in capturing Benito Mussolini
- Urbano Lugo (born 1962), former pitcher for Major League Baseball from Venezuela
- Urbano Monti (1544–1613), Italian geographer and cartographer
- Urbano Ortega (born 1961), retired Spanish footballer
- Urbano Rattazzi (1808–1873), Italian statesman
- Urbano Rivera (born 1926), football midfielder who played for Uruguay
- Urbano Romanelli (1645-1682), Italian painter of the Baroque period
- Urbano González Serrano (1848–1904), Spanish philosopher, psychologist, and educator
- Urbano Tavares Rodrigues (1923–2013), Portuguese writer and professor of literature

== People with the surname ==
- Carl Urbano (1910–2003), American director at Hanna-Barbera Productions
- José Urbano (born 1966), retired race walker from Portugal
- Manuel Urbano or Manuel Conde (1915–1985), Filipino actor
- Matías Urbano (born 1981), Argentine footballer who plays for Millonarios in the Colombian Categoría Primera A
- Michael Urbano (born 1960), American musician
- Orlando Urbano (born 1984), Italian football (soccer) player
- Pietro Urbano, Italian artist of the Renaissance period
- Umberto Urbano (1885–1969), Italian baritone opera singer

=== Fictional ===
- Frank Urbano, a character played by Antoni Corone on Oz

== See also ==
- Urban (disambiguation)
