= Urbanism (disambiguation) =

Urbanism is the study of how inhabitants of urban areas interact with the built environment.

Urbanism may also refer to:

- Urban planning
- Urban theory
- New Urbanism

== See also ==
- Urbanization
- Urban (disambiguation)
