= Urban =

Urban means "related to a city". In that sense, the term may refer to:

- Urban area, geographical area distinct from rural areas
- Urban culture, the culture of towns and cities

Urban may also refer to:

== General ==
- Urban (name), a list of people with the given name or surname
- Urban (newspaper), a Danish free daily newspaper
- Urban contemporary music, a radio music format
- Urban Dictionary
- Urban Outfitters, an American multinational lifestyle retail corporation
- Urban Records, a German record label owned by Universal Music Group

== Place names in the United States ==
- Urban, South Dakota, a ghost town
- Urban, Washington, an unincorporated community

== See also ==
- New Urbanism, urban design movement promoting sustainable land use
- Pope Urban (disambiguation), the name of several popes of the Catholic Church
- Urban cluster (disambiguation)
- Urban forest inequity, inequitable distribution of trees, with their associated benefits, across metropolitan areas
- Urban forestry, land use management system in which trees or shrubs are cared or protected for well-being
- Urban heat island
- Urban reforestation, planting of trees in urban environments
