= TRM =

TRM may refer to:

== Government ==
- Technical Reference Model, for the United States' federal government
- Teleradio-Moldova, Moldovan state broadcaster

== Places ==
- Trimley railway station, Suffolk, England (by GBR code)
- Troy Transit Center, Michigan, Amtrak station code
- Jacqueline Cochran Regional Airport (IATA code TRM)

== Science and technology ==
- Thermoremanent magnetization, in geology
- Time reversal mirror, in physics and telecommunications
- T_{RM} cell or tissue-resident memory T cell, in biology

== See also ==
- TRMS (disambiguation)
