= Ismael Urbain =

French journalist and interpreter

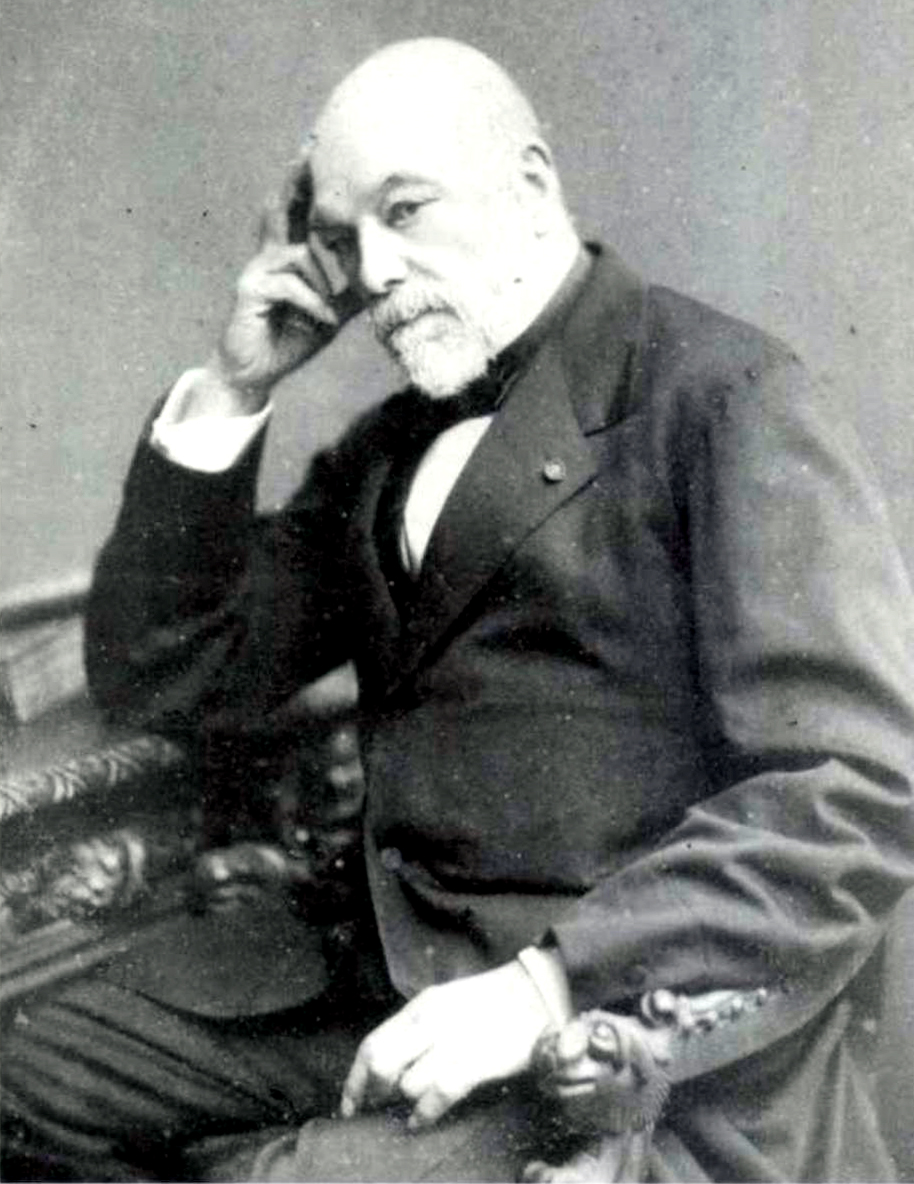
- Ismael Urbain in Marseille in 1868
- Born: Thomas Urbain; 31 December 1812; Cayenne, French Guiana
- Died: 28 January 1884 (aged 71); Algeria
- Occupations: journalist, interpreter
- Writing career
- Pen name: Georges Voisin
- Language: French
- Literary movement: Saint-Simonianism

Ismael Urbain, also Ismayl Urbain (born Thomas Urbain, 31 December 1812 – 28 January 1884) was a French journalist and interpreter.

Born in Cayenne, French Guiana, Urbain was the illegitimate son of a merchant from Marseille named Urbain Brue and a free non-white woman from French Guiana named Appoline. Ismael, who bore his father's first name as his surname, was brought by him to Marseille when he was eight, and there he received an education. In 1830, his father returned him to French Guiana where he hoped that he would turn to business. However, because of the pitiful state of his father's affairs, Urbain was not allowed back, and in the following year he again returned to Marseille.

After discovering Saint-Simonianism, Urbain moved to Paris, where he became the secretary of Gustave d'Eichthal. He was with the Saint-Simonists before embarking with them to the Orient. He took up residence in Damietta in Egypt and taught French there until 1836. The year before he left, he converted to Islam and took the name Ismael.

Back in Paris he worked for a time at Édouard Charton's Le Magasin pittoresque, Le Temps, la Charte de 1839 and la Revue du XIXe siècle.

After learning Arabic in Egypt, he obtained the post of military interpreter in Algeria for which he had applied. He served as interpreter to several generals: Bugeaud, Rumilly and Changarnier. In 1840 he married a young Algerian woman with whom he had a daughter in 1843. His vast knowledge and experience of Islam led him to participate in the Algerian administration at a high level. Having become a member of the Governor General's advisory board he took part in most major decisions in Algeria.

In 1845, Urbain was summoned to the Ministry of War and he returned to France where his wife was to follow. Unable to conjoin the Muslim family with the French family he resolved to marry his wife before civil status on 20 May 1857; the next day his daughter, who was constantly being teased by her schoolmates at the private school run by Sœurs de la Doctrine Chrétienne in Constantine, was baptized. This act, however, was not enough to appease the Roman Catholic community, made up of Spaniards, Maltese and people from the South of France who composed the new society of colonists in Algeria, who accused him of failing to obtain the blessing of the church for his marriage and the lack of a baptism for his wife.

Urbain has been largely attributed as the source of the arabophilia of Napoleon III, to whom he was a personal adviser. He corresponded with many key political, military and cultural people in the Algeria of his time. In an 1857 article in Revue de Paris Urbain denounced the term "Kabylie" as an invention due to the French spirit of systematization, used neither by the Arabs nor by the Berbers of Algeria. In 1861 he published under the pen name Georges Voisin L’Algérie pour les Algériens (Algeria for the Algerians), in which he defends the idea of an Arab Kingdom that Napoleon III, influenced by the ideas of the Saint-Simonists, had wanted to implement at the instigation of Urbain, but which was fiercely opposed by the colonists and economic interests in Algeria. The renewed attacks by Urbain in 1870 in L’Algérie française: indigènes et immigrants (French Algeria: natives and immigrants) provoked very violent agitation in the colony. The writings of Urbain aroused such passionate reactions that they almost completely overshadowed the ideas which were developed in the ensuing polemics.

Urbain died in Algeria. On his death Émile Masqueray rejoined the fight for the rights of the Algerians against the repressive behavior of the colonists.

== Publications ==
- Lettres sur la race noire et la race blanche, with Gustave d'Eichthal, Paris, Paulin, 1839
- Algérie. Du gouvernement des tribus. Chrétiens et musulmans, Français et Algériens, Paris, J. Rouvier, 1848
- De la Tolérance dans l’islamisme, Paris, Pillet fils aîné, 1856
- L’Algérie pour les Algériens, Paris, Michel Lévy frères, 1861
- L’Algérie française. Indigènes et immigrants, Paris, Challamel aîné, 1862

== Bibliography ==
- Michel Levallois, Ismaÿl Urbain (1812–1884) : une autre conquête de l'Algérie, ed. Maisonneuve & Larose, 2001, ISBN 2-7068-1533-7
