= Saint Urban (disambiguation) =

Saint Urban may refer to:

- Pope Urban I, 3rd century Pope
- Saint Urban, Washington, an unincorporated community
- Urban of Langres (327–390), French bishop
- Urban, one of the Martyrs of Zaragoza in 303 CE
- St. Urban Tower a Gothic prismatic campanile with a pyramidal roof in Košice, Slovakia.

== See also ==
- Saint-Urbain (disambiguation)
- Urban (name)
