= Walenty Łukawski =

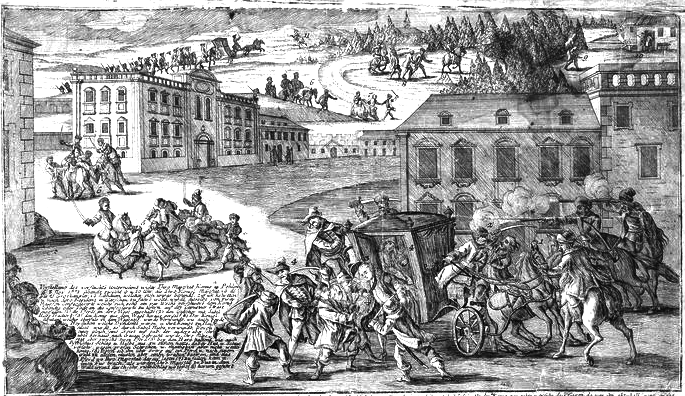
Abduction of King Stanisław August Poniatowski

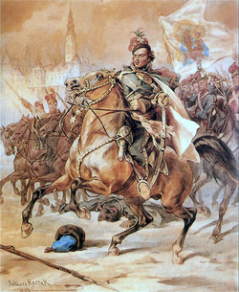
Walenty Łukawski and Kazimierz Pułaski during the Bar Confederation

Walenty Łukawski of Nieczuja coat of arms (c. 1743 – 10 September 1773) was a Polish szlachcic (nobleman), rotmistrz and a member of the Bar Confederation, who led the abduction of King Stanisław August Poniatowski.

The abduction took place on 3 November 1771 in Warsaw. Łukawski led a team of 29 men, only one of whom, Jan Kuźma, actually left with the King as the abduction proceeded, since the others either fled or were arrested, including Łukawski himself.

Łukawski and Cybulski were tried by the Sejm as regicides and were sentenced to death, despite the King's pleas to spare their lives (in the Polish–Lithuanian Commonwealth, the king had no right of clemency for those sentenced by the Sejm). Kuźma was sentenced to exile for life.

Łukawski was executed publicly in Warsaw on 10 September 1773. He was beheaded, quartered and burned in the presence of twenty thousand people. His wife, Marianna, was forced to watch the execution and died three days later from the shock.
