= Saint-Urbain =

Saint-Urbain may refer to:

Places

- Saint-Urbain, Finistère, a French commune in Finistère département
- Saint-Urbain-Maconcourt, a French commune in Haute-Marne département
- Saint-Urbain, Quebec, a parish municipality in Quebec, Canada
- Saint-Urbain-Premier, a municipality in Quebec, Canada
- Saint Urbain Street, a major one-way street in Montreal, Quebec, Canada
- Saint-Urbain, Vendée, a French commune in Vendée département

Other uses

- Saint Urbain, a New York City-based branding and advertising agency
- St. Urbain's Horseman (TV series), a 2007 Canadian television drama miniseries
- Basilica of St. Urbain, Troyes, a large medieval basilica

== See also ==
- Saint Urban (disambiguation)
- Urbain (disambiguation)
