= Urbánek =

Urbánek (feminine Urbánková) is a surname of Czech and Slovak origin, derived from the name Urban. Notable people with the surname include:

- Aleš Urbánek (born 1980), Czech footballer
- Jim Urbanek (1945–2009), American football player
- Johann Urbanek (1910–2000), Austrian footballer
- Karel Urbánek (born 1941), Czech communist politician
- Naďa Urbánková (1939–2023), Czech singer
- Petra Urbánková (born 1991), Czech track and field sprinter
- Robert Urbanek (born 1987), Polish discus thrower
- Růžena Urbánková (1912–?), Czech politician
