= Nieczuja coat of arms =

Polish coat of arms

Nieczuja
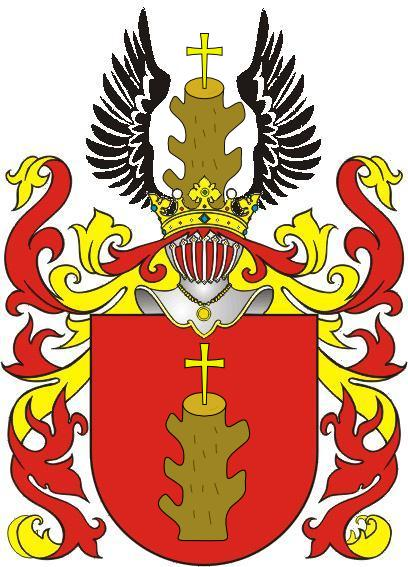
- Battle cry: Cielech, Nieczuja
- Alternative names: Cielech, Ostrew, Ostrzew, Ostrzeszew, Nieczyja, Nieczuja Pruska, Pień, Necznia, odmiana Nieczaj
- Earliest mention: 1397
- Towns: none
- Families: 160 names altogether: Abudowicz, Abuniewicz, Achramowicz, Adamczowski, Bartlewicz, Bartliński, Bartosina, Barzycki, Batocki, Bazar, Berkowicz, Białkowski, Biciutko, Biczysko, Branwicki, Bystrzejowski, Byszowski, Cebulka, Chłopicki, Chustecki, Cybulka, Czewil, Dąbrowski, Dembiński, Dębiński, Dmitriew, Dobieszkowski, Dobrzechowski, Domaszewski, Domżalski, Dowgielewicz, Dymitr, Dziemieszkiewicz, Dzierżek, Frącki, Galicz, Gembicki, Gębicki, Gładysz, Goły, Grabionek, Grębarski, Gręboszewski, Grzymułtowski, Gulyacz, Hajdukiewicz, Hościełło, Imielski, Jegierski, Jemielski, Jokiewicz, Judynowicz, Jurkiewicz, Kapuściński, Kaupowicz, Kiełtyk, Kochowski, Kocięcki, Koja, Kongel, Kongiel, Koniarkowski, Koniatowski, Konieński, Krassuski, Krasuski, Krobicki, Krzesiński, Krzyniecki, Kurek, Kuropatnicki, Kwieciński, Lipicki, Łoknicki, Łomiński, Łomnicki, Łosiewski, Łukawski, Machocki, Miładowski, Miłaszowski, Minczewski, Miniewicz, Miniewski, Mniowski, Moszczkowski, Moszczukowski, Mroczek, Murcz, Myślichowski, Nadłtowski, Nieczuj, Nieczuja, Nieczulski, Nieczykowski, Niesłuchowski, Orlik, Ostrowski, Ostrzyński, Parnicki, Pęchowski, Piotrkowski, Plewiński, Pomarzeński, Praczyk, Praski, Praso, Prasol, Przełęcki, Pstrowicz, Raguski, Rosiejewski, Rosiejowski, Roszkowski, Sadleński, Sadlewski, Sadzicki, Sajewski, Schuliński, Sekuła, Slaski, Smoleński, Snieszek, Stanechowski, Starzechowski, Stefański, Szklanka, Szumieński, Ślanka, Ślaski, Śnieszek, Śnieszko, Śnieżek, Trojan, Urbański, Wapowski, Wichorski, Widlic, Widlica, Wierzbicki, Wilczepolski, Wilczopolski, Wilczopolski Pszczółka, Wilczopski, Wilczowski, Wilczycki, Wilkocki, Winowski, Witkiewicz, Witosławski, Wszeborski, Zakowicz, Zamięcki, Zbiegniewski, Zemęcki, Zgierski, Ziemęcki, Ziemiecki, Ziemięcki, Zimnicki, Zużelnicki, Żakowicz

Nieczuja is a Polish coat of arms that was used by many szlachta families in the Polish–Lithuanian Commonwealth.

== Blazon ==
Gules, a Brunâtre stock or tree stub, with three lopped branches on the dexter, and two on the sinister (rarely reversed), all proper, debruised of a cross or sword in chief, also proper.

Out of a crest coronet, between two vols, the arms of the shield is repeated.

There is also older version of Nieczuja coat of arms. Azure, an Argent stock or tree stub, with four lopped branches on the dexter, and four on the sinister, all proper, debruised, of a cross or sword in chief, also proper.

== Notable bearers ==
Notable bearers of this coat of arms include:

- Krzysztof Grzymułtowski (1620–1687), voivod of Poznań, diplomat and member of the Sejm
- Wespazjan Kochowski (1633–1700), historian, philosopher and baroque poet
- Walenty Łukawski (1743–1773), rotmistrz, member of Bar Confederation
- Józef Chłopicki (1771–1854), baron, General of Napoleon
- Henryk Dembiński (1791–1864), engineer, traveler and general
- Stanisław Witkiewicz (1851–1915), painter, architect, writer and art theoretician
- Stanisław Ignacy Witkiewicz (1885–1939), painter, writer and philosopher
- Fictional Marcin Nieczuja from Zygmunt Kaczkowski's The Last of Nieczujas cycle of gawęda szlachecka

== See also ==
- Polish heraldry
