= Urbanovich =

Urbanovich is an East Slavic patronymic surname meaning "son of Urban". Notable people with the surname include:

- Viktor Urbanovich
- Galina Urbanovich
- Vladimir Urbanovich

== See also ==
- Urbanovic
- Urbanovičs
- Urbanowicz
- Urbonavičius
