= TRMS =

TRMS may refer to:

- The Rachel Maddow Show, abbreviated as TRMS in the show
- Time-resolved mass spectrometry
