= Paweł Urban =

Paweł Urban 帕偉鄂本
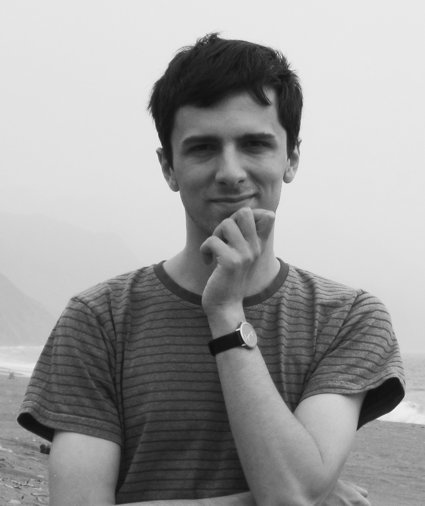
- Education: University of Warsaw; University of Alcalá; University of York
- Known for: Analytical chemistry; Mass spectrometry
- Scientific career
- Fields: Chemist
- Workplaces: University of Warsaw; University of York; ETH Zurich; National Chiao Tung University; National Tsing Hua University
- Doctoral advisor: David M. Goodall

Paweł Urban (also spelled as Pawel L. Urban (Chinese name: 鄂本帕偉)) is a chemist and is a professor of Chemistry in the National Tsing Hua University (Hsinchu, Taiwan). He received his Ph.D. in Chemistry from the University of York (United Kingdom). Urban's research interests include mass spectrometry and biochemical analysis.

== Academic activity ==
Urban is an inventor of the hydrogel micropatch sampling method, fizzy extraction, systems for imaging chemical reactions, and micro-arrays for mass spectrometry (MAMS). He co-authored a book on time-resolved mass spectrometry, and over 100 papers. Urban is associate editor of HardwareX and acted as a guest editor in Philosophical Transactions of the Royal Society A. His h-index is 34. He received the Ta-You Wu Memorial Award.
