= Chlumec (Ústí nad Labem District) =

- Town
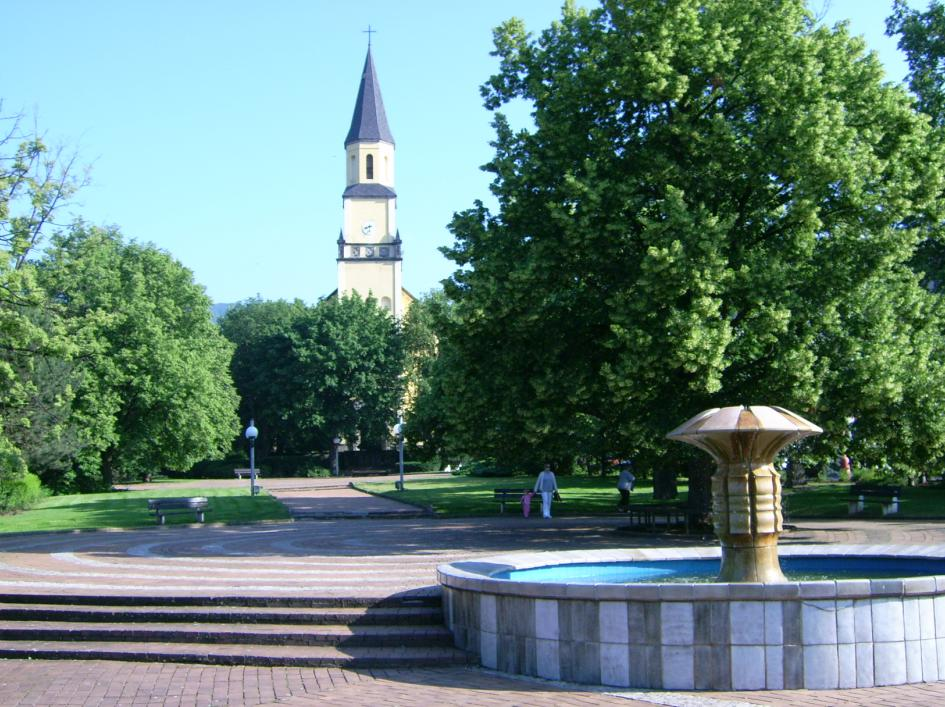
- Town square

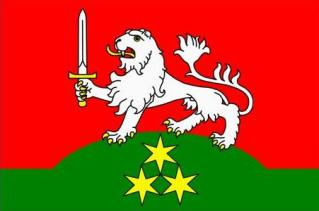
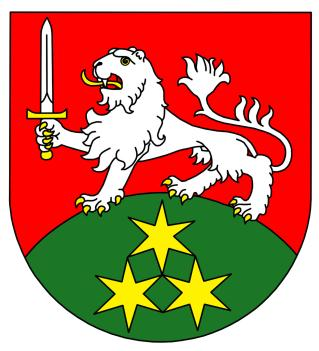
- Flag Coat of arms

- Location in the Czech Republic
- Coordinates: 50°41′50″N 13°56′20″E
- Country: Czech Republic
- Region: Ústí nad Labem
- District: Ústí nad Labem
- First mentioned: 993

Government
  - Mayor: Veronika Srnková

Area
  - Total: 12.87 km^{2} (4.97 sq mi)
- Elevation: 235 m (771 ft)

Population (2026-01-01)
  - Total: 4,228
  - Density: 328.5/km^{2} (850.9/sq mi)
- Time zone: UTC+1 (CET)
  - Summer (DST): UTC+2 (CEST)
- Postal codes: 400 10, 403 39
- Website: www.mesto-chlumec.cz

Chlumec (Czech pronunciation: [ˈxlumɛts]; German: Kulm) is a town in Ústí nad Labem District in the Ústí nad Labem Region of the Czech Republic. It has about 4,200 inhabitants.

== Administrative division ==
Chlumec consists of six municipal parts (in brackets population according to the 2021 census):

- Chlumec (3,443)
- Český Újezd (74)
- Hrbovice (9)
- Stradov (355)
- Střížovice (49)
- Žandov (241)

Český Újezd, Hrbovice and Střížovice form an exclave of the municipal territory.

== Etymology ==
The word chlumec is a diminutive of chlum, which is an old Czech word for 'hill'. Both Chlum and Chlumec are common Czech toponyms.

== Geography ==
Chlumec is located about 5 kilometres (3 mi) northwest of Ústí nad Labem. There are two significant fishponds in the territory, called Nový rybník and Zámecký rybník.

The towns extends into three geomorphological regions. Most of the municipal territory lies in the eastern tip of the Most Basin lowlands, the northern part lies in the Ore Mountains, and the villages of Český Újezd and Střížovice lie on the slopes of the Central Bohemian Uplands.

== History ==
The first written mention of Chlumec is in a deed of Duke Boleslaus II from 993, where the obligation of Chlumec to pay tithe to the newly established Břevnov Monastery is mentioned. In 1521, Chlumec became a town.

The Battle of Chlumec was fought on 18 February 1126 in the vicinity of the village, the culmination of a 12th-century war of succession in the Duchy of Bohemia.

After the great Battle of Dresden (26–27 August 1813), the Battle of Kulm took place here on 29–30 August, between the French Empire under Dominique Vandamme and an allied army of Austrians, Prussians, and Russians. The French were defeated and Vandamme surrendered with his army of 10,000 men. The heights above Chlumec were the site of the Second Battle of Kulm, 17 September 1813.

== Demographics ==
Historical population

| Year | Pop. | ±% |
|---|---|---|
| 1869 | 1,684 | — |
| 1880 | 2,014 | +19.6% |
| 1890 | 2,038 | +1.2% |
| 1900 | 2,227 | +9.3% |
| 1910 | 2,452 | +10.1% |

| Year | Pop. | ±% |
|---|---|---|
| 1921 | 2,565 | +4.6% |
| 1930 | 2,762 | +7.7% |
| 1950 | 1,750 | −36.6% |
| 1961 | 1,758 | +0.5% |
| 1970 | 1,677 | −4.6% |

| Year | Pop. | ±% |
|---|---|---|
| 1980 | 3,443 | +105.3% |
| 1991 | 3,971 | +15.3% |
| 2001 | 4,110 | +3.5% |
| 2011 | 4,476 | +8.9% |
| 2021 | 4,171 | −6.8% |

Source: Censuses

== Transport ==
The D8 motorway (part of the European route E55) from Ústí nad Labem to the Czech–German border runs next to the town.

== Sights ==
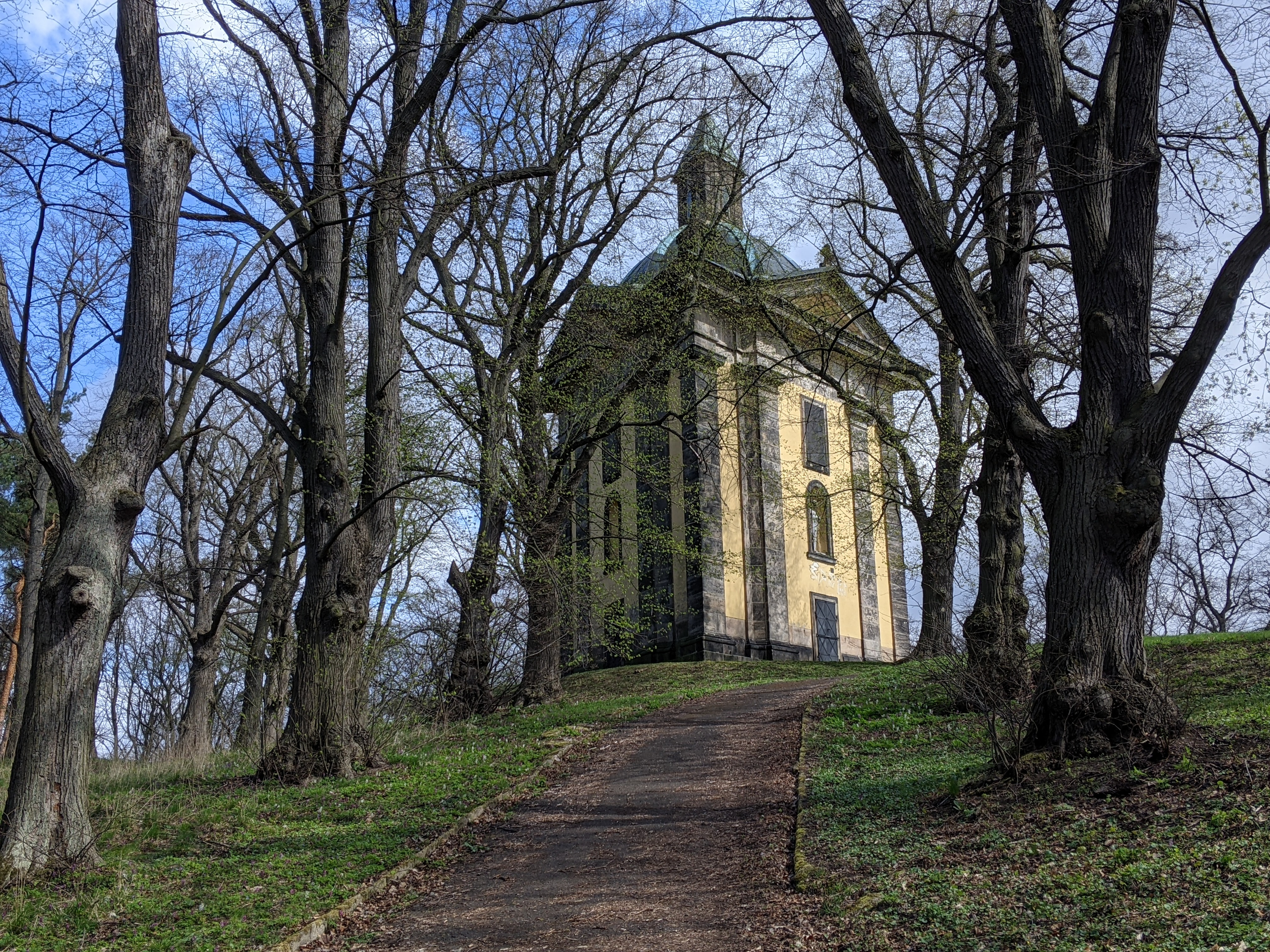
Chapel of the Holy Trinity

The most valuable monument is the Chapel of the Holy Trinity, located on the Horka hill. It was built in the Baroque style in 1690–1691. In 1838, the family tomb of the Westhalen-Fürstenberg noble family was built under the chapel. The Stations of the Cross leads to the chapel. It was founded in 1751–1752 by Countess Marie Alžběta Krakovská of Kolowrat.

The main landmark of the centre of the town is the Church of Saint Gall. It was built in 1847–1852.

== Notable people ==
- Johann Georg Urbansky (1675–1738), sculptor
