= Gembicki =

Nałęcz coat of arms, used by some of Gembicki family

Gembicki (feminine: Gembicka, plural: Gembiccy) is a Polish surname. Some of them use Nałęcz coat of arms or Nieczuja coat of arms. It may be transliterated as: DGembicky, Gembitsky, Gembitzky, Gembytsky, Gembytska, Gębicki, Gębicka, Gebicki, Gebicka. Notable people with the surname include:

- Andrzej Gembicki of Nałęcz (died in 1654), Bishop of Gniezno
- Anna Gembicka (born 1991), Polish politician, member of the Sejm
- Jan Gembicki of Nałęcz (1602–1675), Bishop of Kujawy, Bishop of Chełmno, Bishop of Płock, Grand Secretary of the Crown
- Piotr Gembicki (1585–1657), Bishop of Przemyśl, Bishop of Kraków
- Sebastián Gembický (born 2001), Slovak footballer
- Tadeusz Gembicki (1928–1991), General of the Polish Army, Deputy Commander of the Polish Air Defence Force
- Wawrzyniec Gembicki (1559–1624), Chancellor of Poland, Archbishop of Gniezno, Bishop of Włocławek and Bishop of Chelmno
