= Urbonavičius =

- Lithuanian surname
- m.: Urbonavičius
- f.: (unmarried): Urbonavičiūtė
- f.: (married): Urbonavičienė
- Related names: Urbonaitis/Urboneit, Polish: Urbanowicz, Russian: Urbanovich, Yiddish: Urbanowitz

Urbonavičius is a Lithuanian family name, a patronymic from the given name Urbonas created with the suffix -ičius, which is a Lithuanization of the Polish/Ruthenian patronymic suffix -wicz/-vich.

Notable people with the surname include:

- Laurynas Urbonavicius, Lithuanian MMA fighter
- Saulius Urbonavičius (born 1963), Lithuanian rock musician from group LT United
- Pranas Urbonavičius (1868 - 1941), Lithuanian priest, prelate, organizer of the distribution of the banned Lithuanian press
- Rita Urbonavičiūtė, Lithuanian theater manager
- Simonas Urbonavičius, Lithuanian heavyweight boxer

== See also ==
- Urbanavičius
