= Johann Georg Urbansky =

German sculptor (1675–1738)

Johann Georg(e) Urbansky (Czech: Jan Jiří Urbanský, Polish: Jan Jerzy Urbański ) (1675–1738) was a Bohemian-German baroque-era sculptor and carver, who was mainly active in Lower Silesia.

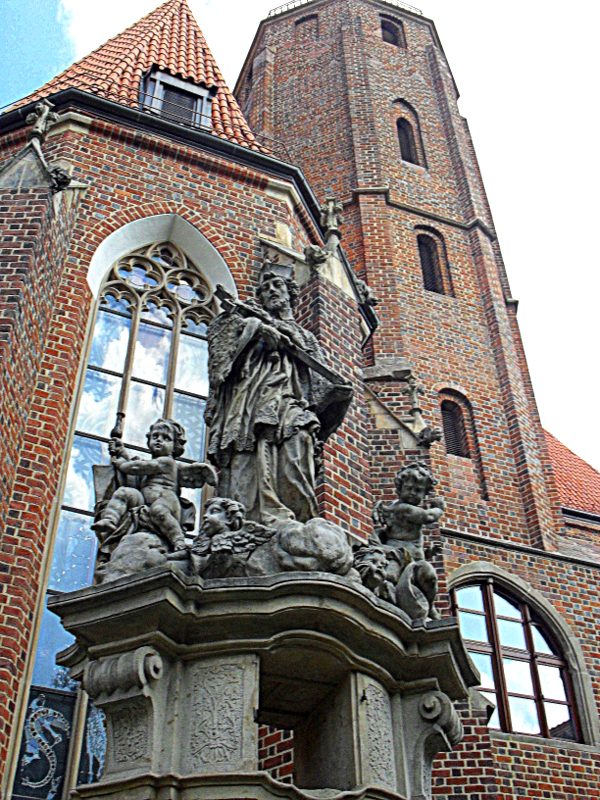
Statue of John of Nepomuk (Saint Matthew church in Wrocław)

== Life ==
He was born in Kulm (now Chlumec) in Northern Bohemia. In 1693 he became a student of the sculptor Johann Brokoff in Prague. In 1697 he went to Bautzen to continue his apprenticeship with Theodor Pausewein. After 1718 he was active in Breslau (now Wrocław), working together with other sculptors like Johann Albrecht Siegwitz and Franz Joseph Mangoldt.

== Work (selection) ==
- Breslau (now Wrocław)
  - Wrocław Cathedral:
    - Marble pulpit (1723, together with Johann Adam Karinger)
    - Sculptures of the Saints Gregory and Hieronymus (1727)
    - Epitaphs of the bishops Gottfried and Nanker (1723)
  - St. Mary Magdalene Church, Organ Case (1722–1724)
  - Cathedral of St. Vincent and St. James, Decoration of the mausoleum (1723–1727, together with Johann Albrecht Siegwitz, Johann Adam Karinger und Ignaz Albrecht Provisore
  - Two John of Nepomuk-monuments, one at the St. Matthias Church (1723) and the other at the Church of the Holy Cross (1730–32)
- Hirschberg (now Jelenia Góra)
  - Church of the Holy Cross, figural decoration of the high altar (1727–1729, attributed)
- Striegau (now Strzegom)
  - Parish Church St. Peter and Paul, side altar sculptures of the saints Gertrude and Scholastica (1720–1725, attributed)
- Groß Tinz (now Tyniec nad Ślęzą)
  - Statue of John of Nepomuk in front of the churchyard (1733)
