= Urban cluster =

Urban cluster may refer to:

- Urban cluster (UC) in the US census. See List of United States urban areas
- Urban cluster (France), a statistical area defined by France's national statistics office
- City cluster, mainly in Chinese English, synonymous with megalopolis
