= Karl Urban (disambiguation) =

Karl Urban (born 1972) is a New Zealand actor.

Karl Urban may also refer to:

- Karl von Urban (1802–1877), Austrian field marshal lieutenant
- Karl Urban (aviator) (1894–1918), Austrian fighter pilot
