= Friedrich Maria Urban =

Psychologist

Friedrich Maria Urban (born Friedrich Johann Victor Urban; 28 December 1878 – 4 May 1964) was an Austrian-Czech psychologist, known for the introduction of probability weightings used in experimental psychology.

== Biography ==
Friedrich Johann Victor Urban was born on 28 December 1878 into a German-speaking family in Brno, Moravia, Austria-Hungary. He adopted the name "Friedrich Maria" as a pen name and his published articles appear under the name "F. M. Urban". He was a gymnasium graduate in Brno in 1897 and received his Promotion (Ph.D.) in philosophy from the University of Vienna in 1902. He did research and studied probability under Wilhelm Wirth in Leipzig. He taught psychological acoustics at Harvard University from February 1904 to November 1905. He was a Fellow for Research in Psychology at the University of Pennsylvania from 1905 to 1908.

In 1914 Urban returned to Brno and married Adele Königsgarten (born 1884), who was Jewish. At the outbreak of World War I, he and his wife moved to Sweden, where he did research from 1914 to 1917 at the Swedish Academy of Sciences. In 1917 he returned to Brno and served in the Austrian army. Brno was transferred to the sovereignty of the Czechoslovak Republic in 1919. Because his fluency in Czech was inadequate for an academic post, from 1919 he worked as a statistician for an insurance company, but continued to publish papers on psychometry and psychophysics. Urban and his Jewish wife stayed in Brno throughout World War II, although they sent their two daughters abroad. At the end of World War II, he was put into a concentration camp by the Soviet Red Army and then by the Soviet-controlled Czechoslovak regime. He was released owing to pleas from foreign colleagues, but he was forced in 1948 to leave Czechoslovakia. He and his wife joined their elder daughter in Norway and then lived in Brazil from 1949 to 1952 where he lectured at the University of São Paulo on factor analysis. In 1952 Urban and his wife went to live with their younger daughter in France, living first in Toulon and then Maisons-Laffitte near Paris.

In 1911 he was elected a Fellow of the American Association for the Advancement of Science. He was an Invited Speaker of the ICM in 1928 in Bologna.

== Müller-Urban weights ==
Müller-Urban weights are based on techniques introduced by G. E. Müller in 1904 and by F. M. Urban in 1912.

In the 1940s and 1950s, computers were not available and parameter estimation was a laborious job. The main estimation method was borrowed from psychophysics and known as the constant process. The method consisted of fitting a weighted regression line through the data points and the empirical probits. ... The weights used in the regression analysis were known as the Müller-Urban weights. Lawley (1941) derived maximum-likelihood (ML) estimators for the item parameters in the normal-ogive model and showed that these were identical to the constant-process estimators of empirical probits in the Müller-Urban weights.

Contemporary psychologists have replaced Müller-Urban weights with newer statistical procedures.

== Selected publications ==
- with R. M. Yerkes: "Time-Estimation in its Relations to Sex, Age, and Physiological Rhythms." in Harvard Psychological Studies vol. 2 (1906): 405–430.
- The application of statistical methods to the problems of psychophysics. No. 3. Psychological Clinic Press, 1908.
- "The method of constant stimuli and its generalizations." Psychological Review 17, no. 4 (1910): 229–259.
- "The future of psychophysics." Psychological Review 37, no. 2 (1930): 93–106. doi:10.1037/h0072059
- "The Weber-Fechner law and mental measurement." Journal of Experimental Psychology 16, no. 2 (1933): 221–238. doi:10.1037/h0070805
- "The method of equal appearing intervals." Psychometrika 4, no. 2 (1939): 117–131. doi:10.1007/BF02288491
