= Peter Urban =

Peter Urban may refer to:

- Peter Urban (karate) (1934–2009), American karateka
- Peter Urban (fencer) (born 1938), Canadian fencer
- Peter Urban (translator) (1941–2013), German writer and translator
- Peter Urban (presenter) (born 1948), German musician and radio host
