= Urban, South Dakota =

Coordinates: 43°46′23″N 103°12′10″W

Urban is a ghost town in Custer County, in the U.S. state of South Dakota.

== History ==
The town of Urban was named after the hope that it would become something "pertaining to a city" (i.e., comparable to a city).
