= Michael J. Urbonas =

American writer and Roman Catholic cleric

Michael J. Urbonas (September 26, 1886 - November 18, 1976) of the Roman Catholic Diocese of Erie, Pennsylvania, is author of the poem The Three Kings and the book One Hundred Religious Rhymes. The Three Kings is a popular Christmas celebratory retelling of the Biblical Magi, who, in Christian tradition, visited Jesus shortly after his birth.

Urbonas died on November 18, 1976.
