= Urbonas =

Urbonas is a Lithuanian language masculine given name and surname. It corresponds to the surname Urban

Notable people with the surname include:

- Gediminas Urbonas, artist and MIT professor, awarded the Lithuanian National Prize for Culture and Arts in 2007
- Julijonas Urbonas, artist, perhaps best known as the designer of the Euthanasia Coaster, a hypothetical roller coaster engineered to humanely take the life of a human being
- Michael J. Urbonas (died 1976), American Roman Catholic clergyman
- Rolandas Urbonas, Lithuanian paralympic athlete
- Valdas Urbonas (born 1967), Lithuanian footballer
- Žydrūnas Urbonas (born 1976), Lithuanian basketball player
