= Urbano García Alonso =

Spanish journalist (born 1965)

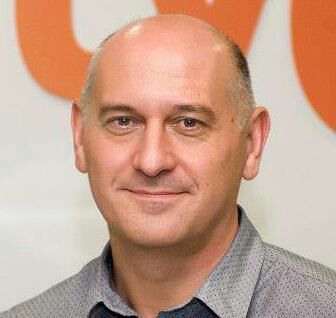
- Born: Urbano García Alonso; 13 April 1965 (age 61); Plasencia, Extremadura, Spain
- Occupations: Journalist, communicator

Urbano García Alonso (born 13 February 1965, Plasencia) is a Spanish journalist. In 2021 he was appointed Digital and Innovation Director with RTVE.

== Biography ==
Urbano García attended the Complutense University of Madrid where he completed a degree in Information science. During his career he interned at the "El Periódico de Extremadura" and the "COPE", based in the province of Cáceres. In the last two years of his major, he worked in "Radiocadena Española", currently known as RNE, Spain´s national public radio service.

In May 1989, he successfully sat the national entrance exams in order to work for TVE, the national public-service television broadcaster in Spain and he began to work there in September of the same year. He started to work as an editor but later he was passing through different positions as the news reader. He participated mainly in regional news programmes but also collaborated on music, agriculture and sports programmes.

In 1991, he obtained the post of head on news opposition in which he had been practising for one year. In 1996, he was appointed director of TVE Extremadura and he remained in that position until 2002.

Between 2008 and 2011, he took a break from TVE and began working in Canal Extremadura Televisión as head of sports and planning and he also had a post in the presentation and management of programmes such as Todo DXT and Zona Champions, a sports programme. When he finished the stage in Canal Extremadura Televisión, he returned to work in TVE as an editor and a news presenter.

He has been the director of RTVE Extremadura.

He resides in Mérida, Spain.
