= Urpo =

Urpo is a given name. Notable people with the name include:

- Urpo Korhonen (1923–2009), Finnish cross-country skier
- Urpo Lahtinen, Finnish magazine publisher
- Urpo Pikkupeura (born 1957), former ice speed skater from Finland
- Urpo Sivula (born 1988), Finnish professional volleyball player
- Urpo Ylönen (born 1943), goaltending coach and a retired professional ice hockey player who played in the SM-liiga

== See also ==
- The Urpo Ylönen trophy is an ice hockey award given by the Finnish SM-liiga to the best goalie of the season
