= Military interpreter (France) =

Military interpreter in the French army

Military interpreters in the French Army translate into and out of foreign languages for the French military. A sous-officier or interpreter officer serves in uniform, accompanying the French armed forces on all its foreign expeditions for 200 years. Today known as Officiers et Sous-officiers de Réserve Qualifiés Langues Etrangères (OSRQLE), they were formerly known as Officiers Linguistes de Réserve de l'Armée de Terre (OLRAT), Interprètes/Officiers Interprètes de Réserve de l'Armée de Terre (IRAT/OIRAT) or Officiers de Liaison et Interprète de Réserve (OLIR). The unit was first set up for Bonaparte's Egyptian expedition, and so their insignia is a sphinx on a blue terrestrial globe divided up by lingual barriers, on a round grey circular background with rays symbolising each of the languages spoken by their unit

== History ==
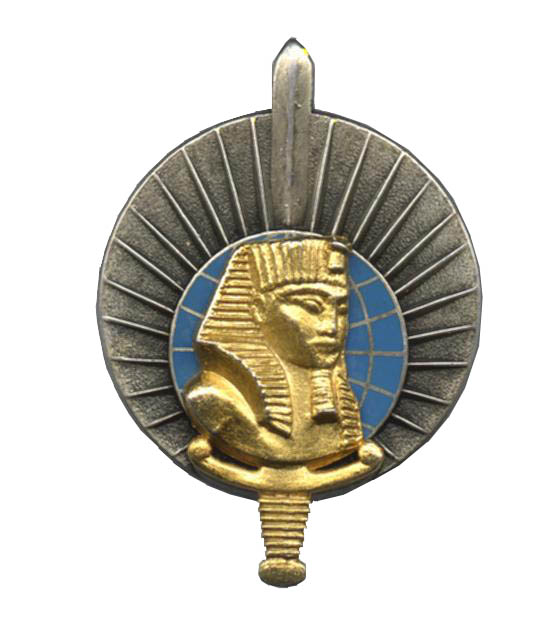
Insignia of the Linguistes de l'Armée de Terre (OSRQLE, OLRAT, OIRAT)

=== French invasion of Egypt ===
The 1931 "notice sur les Officiers Interprètes" by the unit's commander Abribat du service des affaires indigènes de la tunisie (a notice largely inspired by the 1876 "Les Interprètes de l'Armée d' Afrique" by Laurent-Charles Feraud) began:

Intermediary truchemans, indispensable between Nations and peoples of different races, have existed since earliest antiquity [...] When Bonaparte took on his glorious Egyptian campaign, he took with him a body of scholars, among whom figured many orientalists and scholars of Arab culture to whom he gave the title of interprètes de l'armée […]'.

Conquerors have always been surrounded by interpreters, a necessity to keep their operations moving, but it took Bonaparte to formalise the military interpreter's role and function.

=== Armée d'Angleterre ===
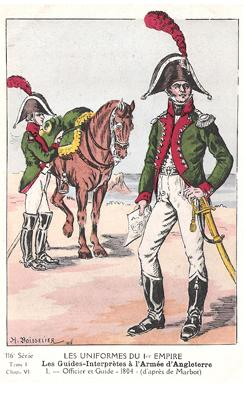
Interpreter for the Army of England, 1803

=== 1870-1918 ===
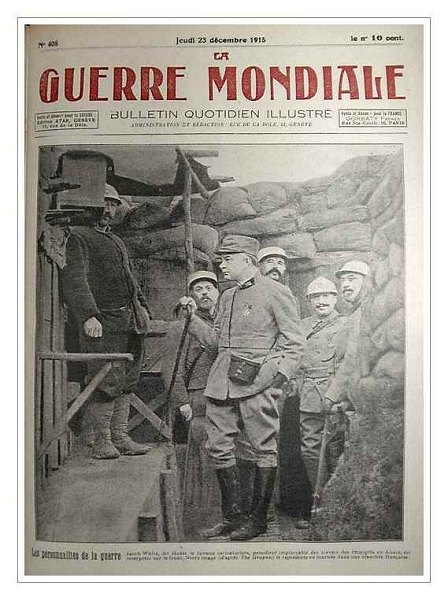
Interpreter-officer Hansi (Jean-Jacques Waltz) in 1915

== Training ==
All military interpreter applicants are usually qualified enough for conducting interpretation right after being commissioned. But, there are several different courses they have to take before being attached to their positions. The courses vary a lot depending on countries, branches, positions and others. (Clooney Kim)

== Associations ==
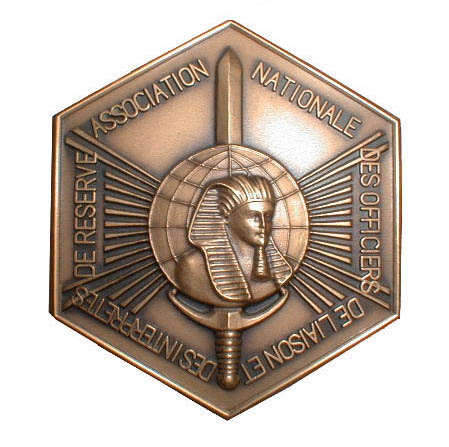
Medal of the association Nationale des Officiers de Liaison et des Interprètes de réserve (ANOLIR)
