= Time-resolved mass spectrometry =

Time-resolved mass spectrometry (TRMS) is a strategy in analytical chemistry that uses mass spectrometry platform to collect data with temporal resolution. Implementation of TRMS builds on the ability of mass spectrometers to process ions within sub-second duty cycles. It often requires the use of customized experimental setups. However, they can normally incorporate commercial mass spectrometers. As a concept in analytical chemistry, TRMS encompasses instrumental developments (e.g. interfaces, ion sources, mass analyzers), methodological developments, and applications.

== Applications ==
An early application of TRMS was in the observation of flash photolysis process. It took advantage of a time-of-flight mass analyzer. TRMS currently finds applications in the monitoring of organic reactions, formation of reactive intermediates, enzyme-catalyzed reactions, convection, protein folding, extraction, and other chemical and physical processes.

== Temporal resolution ==
TRMS is typically implemented to monitor processes that occur on second to millisecond time scale. However, there exist reports from studies in which sub-millisecond resolutions were achieved.
