= Urbain Ozanne =

French-American law enforcement officer during the Reconstruction period

- Born: May 8, 1835; France
- Died: August 11, 1903 (aged 68)
- Occupations: Sheriff, businessman
- Known for: Political organizing, activism
- Children: 1

Urbain Ozanne (May 8, 1835 – August 11, 1903) was a French-born American political organizer, sheriff, and businessman. He was a Republican Party organizer and served as sheriff in Panola County, Mississippi during the Reconstruction era. He later became a businessman in Nevada operating a mail route and hotel.

He served at the January 1868 "Black and Tan" Republican Party convention held in Jackson, Mississippi. He and other participants were disparaged viciously in Democratic Party and Confederate-sympathizing newspaper accounts.

As sheriff in Mississippi toward the end of the Reconstruction era, he tried to stem rampant Ku Klux Klan paramilitary violence. The Mississippi Plan helped restore Democrats to power in 1875 and "Radicals" standing in the way of a restoration of white supremacy were ousted from office by the "redeemers".

== Biography ==
Ozanne was born in France. In 1865 he wrote to the governor of Tennessee on behalf of a "colored" couple whose children remained enslaved. Adelian Ozanne (1857–1864) was buried at a plot owned by Urbain Ozanne.

The Mississippi Historical Society published an account in 1913 of the Reconstruction era in Panola County lamenting "negro-carpetbag" rule and the Republicans' "Scalawag" supporters. It describes Ozanne as a Tennessee Frenchman who worked as a barber before moving to Mississippi to farm. He became active in politics as a Republican organizer. He was unpopular with white Democrats for his work to protect African Americans and their rights, especially voting. His work organizing African American Republicans led to its candidates being referred to as the Ozanne faction.

Ozanne owned a hotel in Nevada, Hotel Ozanne, which he deeded to his son.
