= Urbanowicz =

Urbanowicz is a Polish surname, which literally means "descendant of Urban". It may refer to:

- Chris Urbanowicz, British musician
- Józef Urbanowicz, Soviet and Polish general and political figure
- Krzysztof Urbanowicz (1958–2014), Polish footballer
- Leszek Urbanowicz (born 1964), Polish volleyball player
- Maciej Urbanowicz, Polish ice hockey player, 2008 World Championship team
- Matty Louis Urbanowicz, birth name of Matt Urban, American soldier
- Tomasz Urbanowicz (born 1959), Polish architect
- Witold Urbanowicz (1908–1996), Polish fighter ace

== See also ==
- Urbonavičius
- Urbanovich
- Urbanovic
- Urbanovičs
