= Pope John XIII =

Head of the Catholic Church from 965 to 972

- Bishop of Rome
- Fresco of John XIII celebrating the wedding of Otto II and Theophanu, c. 972 (Abbazia di San Michele Arcangelo, Schifanoia)
- Church: Catholic Church
- Papacy began: 1 October 965
- Papacy ended: 6 September 972
- Predecessor: Leo VIII
- Successor: Benedict VI
- Previous post: Cardinal-Priest of Santa Maria in Domnica (944–965)

Orders
- Consecration: 962
- Created cardinal: 964 by Benedict V

Personal details
- Born: John (Italian: Giovanni) ca. 930 Rome, Papal States
- Died: 6 September 972 (aged 42) Rome, Papal States

Pope John XIII (Latin: Ioannes XIII; c. 930 – 6 September 972) was the bishop of Rome and ruler of the Papal States from 1 October 965 to his death. His pontificate was caught up in the continuing conflict between the Holy Roman emperor, Otto I, and the Roman nobility. After long and arduous negotiations, he succeeded in arranging a Byzantine marriage for Otto II, in an effort to legitimize the Ottonian claim to imperial dignity. He also established church hierarchy in Poland and Bohemia.

== Family and early career ==
John XIII was born in Rome to a man named John, who was a bishop. Older historiography incorrectly identified his father with Duke John Crescentius, a member of the Crescentii family, and consequently portrayed John XIII as a member of the family himself and brother of Crescentius I the Elder. This identification is not supported by contemporary evidence. John XIII was instead connected to the Crescentii through marriage: in 967, his nephew Benedict married Theodoranda, daughter of Crescentius "of the Marble Horse", a prominent Roman nobleman and likely brother of Duke John Crescentius. The marriage established a relationship by affinity between John XIII's family and the powerful Crescentii, who had supported the pope during his return to Rome. Following the death of Theodoranda, Benedict (who was later made count of Sabina by John XIII) married Senatrix Stephania, sister of Crescentius the Elder and Marozia II, mother of Gregory I of Tusculum.

Brought up at the Lateran Palace, he was a member of the schola cantorum, and his career during that time saw him pass through a number of positions, including that of Ostiarius, Reader, Exorcist and Acolyte before reaching the ranks of Subdeacon and then Deacon. After leaving the schola, he took an active part in papal administration, serving in the Chancery of Apostolic Briefs under popes John XII and Leo VIII. He also served as Librarian of the Holy Apostolic See in 961. At some point he was appointed as the bishop of Narni, as which he participated in the Synod of Rome (963) which deposed Pope John XII, as well as the Synod of Rome (964) which saw his restoration.

== Accession and rebellion ==
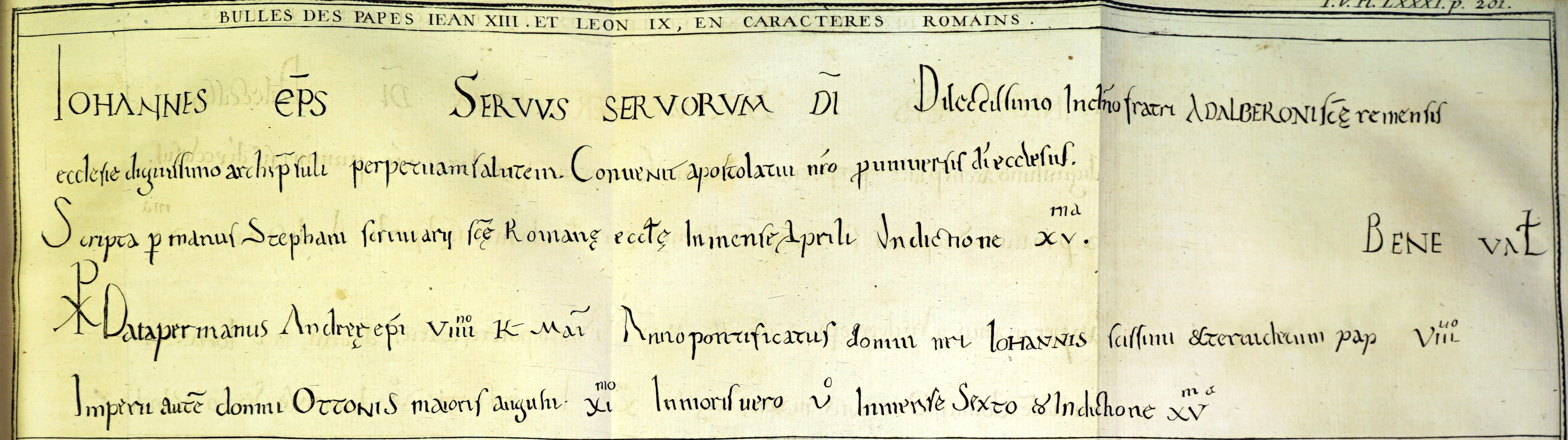
Bull issued by John XIII

After the death of Leo VIII, the Roman nobility asked the Holy Roman emperor, Otto I, for the reinstatement of Pope Benedict V. When this was not possible, Bishop John was suggested as a compromise candidate by Otto's envoys, the bishops Otger of Spiers and Liutprand of Cremona. Elected unanimously, John was consecrated on Sunday, 1 October 965, five months after the death of Leo VIII.

John immediately took on the task of curbing the power of the Roman nobility. He gave members of the Crescentii family important positions to shore up his support, while he also sought closer ties with the emperor. However, with the emperor back in Germany, various local powers decided to take advantage of his absence to intrigue against John XIII. The former king Adalbert of Italy had appeared in front of an army in Lombardy, whilst the Roman nobility, disliking John's behaviour, and resenting his imposition by a foreign power, staged a revolt. Under the leadership of Peter, the Prefect of the city, together with Rofred, the Count of Roman Campagna and the Vestararius Stephen, they roused the Roman nobility by declaring that

”The Saxon kings were going to destroy their power and influence, and were going to lead their children into captivity.”

The leaders of the Roman militia captured the pope on 16 December 965, and imprisoned him in Castel Sant'Angelo. However, fearing John's presence there would inspire resistance from his followers, the pope was moved to one of Rofred's castles in the Campagna. Word eventually reached Otto of all these disturbances, and he entered Italy in late summer of 966 at the head of an enormous army. In the meantime, John had managed to escape from Campagna, and made his way to Capua, placing himself under the protection of Pandulf Ironhead. In thanks for Pandulf's aid, John converted Capua into a Metropolitan see, and consecrated as its first archbishop Pandulf's brother John, on 14 August 966. In Rome, the pope's supporters rose up, and Rofred and Stephen were killed by John Crescentius, son of Crescentius "of the Marble Horse". Pope John left Capua, and crossed into Sabina, where he was met by his brother-in-law, Benedict, who also offered John his support. With Rome effectively back in his hands, John returned and was welcomed back into the city on 14 November 966. Although he was initially lenient towards the rebels, the arrival of Otto saw a change in approach. The emperor banished to Germany the two men appointed consul; the twelve principal militia leaders (the Decarcones, one appointed to each of the city's twelve regions) were hanged. Other plotters were either executed or blinded. The Prefect of the city, Peter, was handed over to John, who ordered him to be hung by his hair from the Equestrian Statue of Marcus Aurelius, after which he was taken down, placed naked and backwards on an ass. A bag of feathers was placed upon his head and two more at his thighs. With a bell fastened round its neck, Peter was driven through the city, and after being thus exposed to the ridicule of the people, Peter was cast into a dungeon before finally being sent by the emperor into Germany. In gratitude for the emperor's intervention, John lauded him by declaring him to be the liberator and restorer of the Church, the illustrious guest, and three times blessed emperor.

In 969, he met Gerbert d'Aurillac, the future Pope Sylvester II, and was so impressed by his scholarly brilliance that he kept him on in Rome in order to learn from him.

== Troubles with the Byzantine Empire ==
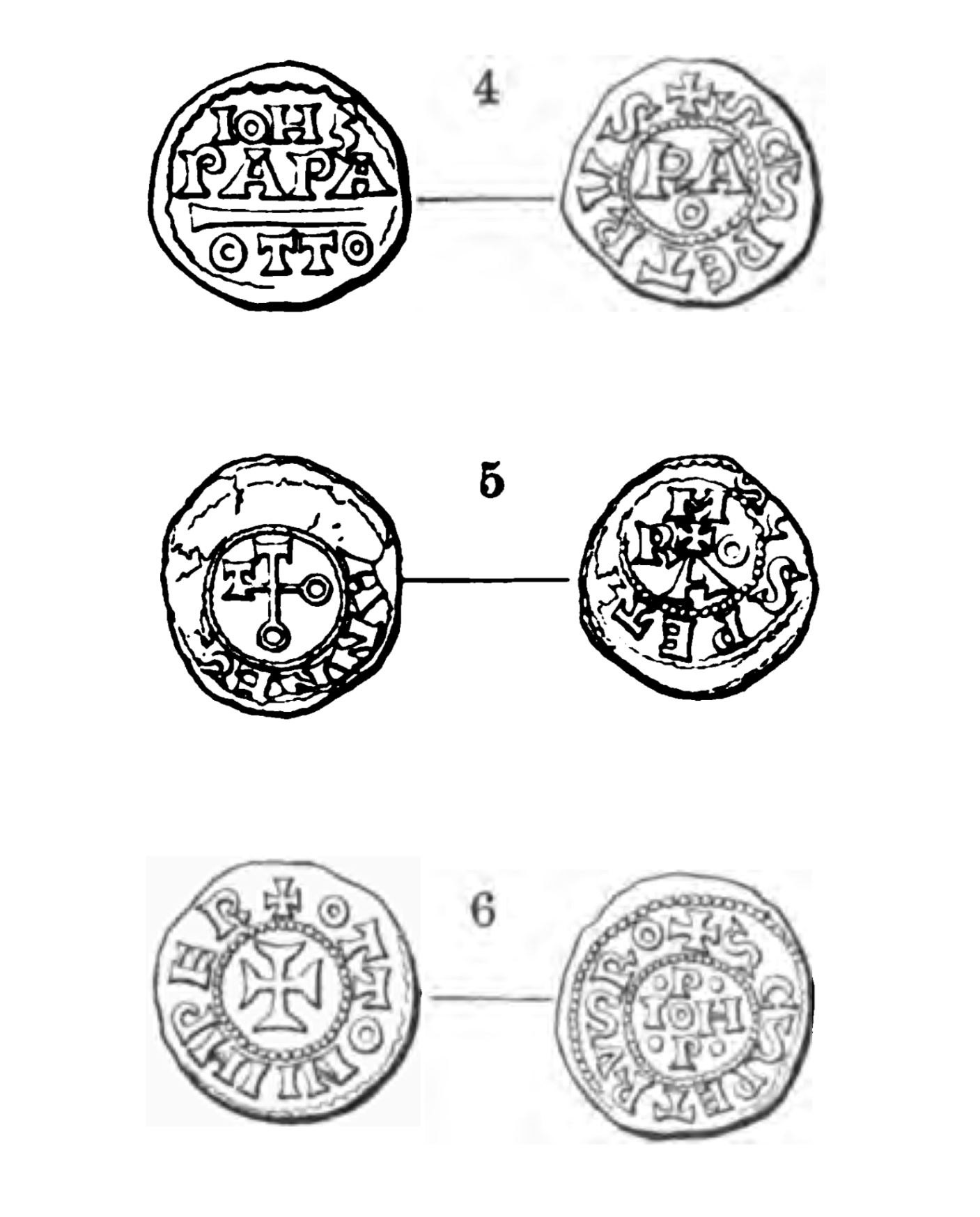
Coins of John XIII

After John XIII's restoration, he worked with the Emperor on ecclesiastical improvements. It was decided in a council held at Rome in the beginning of 967 in the emperor's presence that Grado was to be the patriarchal and metropolitan church of the whole of the Veneto. At another council at Ravenna in April 967, Otto again "restored to the apostolic Pope John the city and territory of Ravenna and many other possessions which had for some time been lost to the Popes." At around this time he also created, at Otto's request, the Archbishopric of Magdeburg.

Then, on Christmas Day in 967, John XIII crowned Otto I's son Otto II as co-emperor. Various synods were held before the emperors left Rome for the south of Italy, in which, sometimes at their request, John XIII took several German monasteries under his special protection, or decided that in some cases they were to remain forever "under the patronage (mundiburdium) of the kings or emperors." With Otto I seeking a marriage alliance with the Byzantine Empire through his son and a Byzantine princess, John XIII lent his support to Otto's cause. He wrote a letter to the Eastern emperor, Nikephoros II Phokas, but ended up insulting him by referring to him, not as "emperor of the Romans", but as "emperor of the Greeks". As his price for the marriage, Otto demanded a dowry from the Eastern Empire, that of the themes of Longobardia and Calabria. Nikephoros retorted by instead demanding the restitution of the Exarchate of Ravenna, which included Rome and the Papal States, as the price for the imperial marriage. When negotiations broke down, Nikephoros refused to write to John XIII in his own hand, instead sending him a threatening letter written by his brother, Leo Phokas the Younger.

After the failure of negotiations, Nikephoros attempted to extend the ecclesiastical jurisdiction of the patriarch of Constantinople into the pope's jurisdiction in southern Italy. The eastern emperor ordered the patriarch to transform the bishopric of Otranto into a metropolitan see, and to ensure that services were no longer said in Latin, but in Greek only. Patriarch Polyeuctus of Constantinople quickly addressed an order to the head of the Church of Otranto giving him authority to consecrate bishops in the churches of Acerenza, Tursi, Gravina, Matera, and Tricarico, all previously dependent on the Church of Rome. In response, and at the request of the Western emperor, John convened a synod in 969, which elevated the bishopric of Benevento into a metropolitan see, thus reducing the influence of the Byzantine Empire and Eastern Orthodox Church there.

The death of Nikephoros Phokas in 969 saw the elevation of John I Tzimiskes. He entered into negotiations with Otto I, and soon Otto II was betrothed to Theophanu, the niece of Tzimiskes. The marriage was performed by John XIII at Rome on 14 April 972.

== Relations with other states ==
John was also involved in the development of ecclesiastical structures across Europe. In 968, John appointed the first bishop in Poland, Jordan. In 973, John appointed Mlada, a sister of Duke Boleslaus II of Bohemia, as an abbess of the Benedictine Order. He gave her a papal bull which authorised the foundation of the Bishopric of Prague in accordance with the wishes of Boleslaus, which had been made through Mlada. John decreed that the church of Saints Vitus and Wenceslaus should be the new cathedral church. At the church of St. George, a convent of nuns was to be established, over which Mlada was to preside. Finally, the Latin rite and not the Byzantine rite was to be followed, and someone who was well instructed in Latin literature had to be chosen as the first bishop.

In 971, John XIII published a bull supporting the action of the English king Edgar the Peaceful and Archbishop Dunstan against the canons of Winchester Cathedral, who refused to give up their wives and concubines. In that same year, John confirmed the privileges which King Edgar had granted the monks of Glastonbury Abbey, and declared that it was under papal protection. Further, John sent a letter to an ealdorman named Aelfric, commanding him to cease taking money from Glastonbury.

In Trier, John appointed the archbishop of Trier as the papal vicar, responsible for promoting the decrees of any synods held in Germany or West Francia. He also granted numerous privileges across Europe. In one case, dated 29 September 970, for the monastery of St. Vincent of Metz, we find the first recorded grant of the Pontificals. Its abbot was granted the use, under certain conditions, of the Dalmatic and Episcopal sandals. John was also the recipient of many requests for help. In one case, the monks of the monastery of St. Peter at Novalisa, asked for the pope to intervene to help protect them against a local count named Ardoin. In another case, in November 971, Archbishop Adalberon of Reims went to Rome to ask the pope to confirm the archbishop's decision to leave some property to the monks of Mouzon Abbey, thereby protecting his donation from King Louis IV of France.

In 970, John bestowed the town of Praeneste as a hereditary lease to Senatrix Stephania, who was probably his sister. Praeneste was to belong to her, her children, and her grandchildren, for a yearly rent of ten gold solidi, but it was afterwards to return to the Church. It is one of the first examples of the introduction of the system of feudalism into Roman territory.

== Death and lore ==
John XIII died on 6 September 972, and was buried in the Basilica of Saint Paul Outside the Walls. He was succeeded by Benedict VI. The earliest surviving written mention of the ancient practice of the blessing of church bells comes from his reign.

Referred to by one chronicler after his death as "The Good", John was noted for his reverence and piety, as well as being highly learned in both scripture and canon law. From childhood he carried the nickname of "the White Hen", due to his light colored hair. His epitaph used to be in the basilica where he was buried, between the front door and the first column, and it read:

"Here, where in death the good pastor would have them placed, are the remains of Pope John. By the mercy of God and the merits of St. Paul, freed from the bonds of death, may he hence ascend into heaven, and share in the happiness of the blessed above. Do you who piously read this epitaph pray that Christ, who with His sacred Blood redeemed the world, may have pity on His servant and free him from his sins."

There is a legend which attached itself to the reign of John XIII. According to Dietrich I of Metz, one of the nobles attached to the court of the emperor Otto I was possessed by an evil spirit, resulting in his tearing at his own face, and biting his hands and arms. The emperor ordered that the nobleman be taken to Pope John XIII, with instructions that the Chains of Saint Peter be placed upon him, and so cure him. According to the legend, John placed several chains on the afflicted man, each of which were copies, but to no effect. However, when John placed the true chain of Saint Peter on him, a thick smoke issued from the nobleman's body, cries were heard in the air, and the evil spirit left the nobleman.

== Notes ==
Catholic Church titles
Preceded by Leo VIII	Pope; 965–972	Succeeded by Benedict VI
