= Diploma Ottonianum =

962 agreement regarding control of the Papal States

The Diploma Ottonianum (also called the Pactum Ottonianum, Privilegium Ottonianum or simply Ottonianum) was an 962 agreement between Pope John XII and Otto I, King of Germany and Italy. It confirmed the earlier Donation of Pepin, granting control of the Papal States to the Popes, regularizing Papal elections, and clarifying the relationship between the Popes and the Holy Roman Emperors.

== Description ==
The forces of John XII, not yet 26 years of age, had been defeated in the war against Pandolfo Testa di Ferro of Capua, and at the same time many strongholds in the Papal States were occupied by Berengar of Ivrea, effectively if not completely legally King of Italy, and his son Adalbert. In this dilemma the Pope had recourse to Otto who reappeared in Italy at the head of a powerful army, as he had in the previous decade, now ostensibly as a papal champion. Berengar, however, did not risk an encounter, but retired to his fortified castles.

Thus, without conclusive military encounters, on January 31, 962, Otto reached Rome. He took an oath to recognize John as Pope and ruler of Rome; to issue no decrees without the Pope's consent; and, in case he should deliver the command in Italy to anyone else, to exact from such person an oath to defend to the utmost of his ability the Pope and the Patrimony of Peter. The Pope for his part swore to keep faith with Otto and to conclude no alliance with Berengar and Adalbert.

Subsequently, on February 2 Otto was solemnly crowned Holy Roman Emperor by the Pope. Ten days later at a Roman synod, John, at Otto's desire, founded the Archbishopric of Magdeburg and the Bishopric of Merseburg, bestowed the pallium on the Archbishop of Salzburg and Archbishop of Trier, and confirmed the appointment of Rather as Bishop of Verona. The next day, the emperor issued a decree, the famous Diploma Ottonianum, in which he confirmed the Roman Church in its possessions, particularly those granted by the Donation of Pepin and by Charlemagne, and provided at the same time that in the future, the Popes should be elected in canonical form, though their consecration was to take place only after the necessary pledges had been given to the emperor or his ambassadors. In essence, the Emperor was to be the guarantor of Papal independence, but to retain the right to confirm Papal elections. Historians debate, in terms of power and prestige, whether the Diploma Ottonianum was a prestigious advantage for the papacy or a political triumph for the emperor.

On 14 February the emperor marched out of Rome with his army to resume the war against Berengar and Adalbert. The Pope now quickly changed his mind, while Otto on his part pressed his imperial authority to excessive limits, and the brief alliance dissolved in wrangling. John sent envoys to the Magyars and the Byzantine Empire to form a league against Otto, who returned to Rome in November 963, and convened a synod of bishops that deposed John and crowned Pope Leo VIII, a layman, as pope.

The authenticity of the contents of this much-discussed document seems certain, even though, like other 10th century documents, the extant document seems to be only a duplicate of the original (Sickel, Das Privilegium Ottos I, für die römische Kirche, Innsbruck, 1883).

== Later developments and repeal ==
The Diploma Ottonianum was reconfirmed in the Diploma Heinricianum co-signed at Easter, 1020, by Pope Benedict VIII (1012–1024) and Emperor Henry II (1002–1024), meeting at Bamberg on the occasion of a papal journey.

Hanns Leo Mikoletzky calls it a "frequently overrated document", and says that Henry would have not been overly concerned with the problem of its many binding stipulations. "For the content of these privileges had taken on a rigid form, whose confirmation was perhaps a question of prestige for the papacy but no longer an exalted obligation for the German king. The recognition of the Church's property and rights which found expression there would surely have been advanced by the Curia in case of emergency on the ground of earlier confirmations without this gesture of Henry's...' (Mikoletzky, Heinrich II. und die Kirche, 1946, pp. 68–69, quoted by Miranda).

Starting from the reign of Pope Leo IX, the Holy See started to gradually free itself from imperial interference. The Emperor's privileges over the Pontiff's elections were formally rescinded by Pope Nicholas II through the papal bull In nomine Domini in 1059, which stated that the authority to elect a Pope exclusively belonged to a college of cardinals, meeting into a conclave.
