= Scholae =

Latin word

Scholae (Greek: Σχολαί) is a Latin word, literally meaning "schools" (from the singular schola, school or group) that was used in the Late Roman Empire to signify a unit of Imperial Guards. The unit survived in the Byzantine Empire until the 12th century. Michel Rouche succinctly traced the word's development, especially in the West: "The term schola, which once referred to the imperial guard, came to be applied in turn to a train of warrior-servants who waited on the king, to the group of clergymen who waited on the bishop, to the monks of a monastery, and ultimately to a choral society; it did not mean 'school' before the ninth century."

== The imperial Scholae ==
While the singular schola still was used to refer to learning of singing and a mode of writing, the plural had an independent meaning. Next to the old kind of school, the Scholae Palatinae, established by Constantine the Great as a replacement to the Praetorian Guard, was the training center of the imperial palace guard. It remained based at Constantinople, eventually declining to a purely ceremonial role. However, in the 8th century, the Scholae were reformed into one of the elite cataphract Tagmata regiments, and continued to serve until the reign of Alexios I Komnenos.

== Ecclesiastical scholae ==
In Christianity, a choralschola is a church choir that sings plainsong. Also, the guilds of notarii (notaries) called themselves one schola, or different scholae. In the 4th century, Pope Sylvester I (died 335) was said to have founded the schola cantorum, reformed by Pope Gregory I (died 604), but there was an oral tradition until the written proof for the foundation of this schola from the 8th century.

== Ancient Greek "Σχολαί" ==
Plural of the Ancient Greek word "σχολή" (from which its Latin counterpart "Scholae" derives), meaning: 'rest, leisure' (Pi., lA), '(learned) conversation, lecture' (PI., Arist.), 'place of lecture, auditorium, school' (Arist.).

== See also ==
- Praetorian Guard
- Imperial guard
- Schola cantorum (papal choir)
- Schola Medica Salernitana

Not related to scholae:

- Non scholae, sed vitae discimus

== Sources ==
- V. H. Galbraith, An Introduction to the Use of the Public Records (1934)
- V. H. Galbraith, Studies in the Public Records (1948)
