= Lateran Council (964) =

The Lateran Council (964) was a synod (or church council) held in the Lateran Palace on 23 June 964, for the purpose of deposing Pope Benedict V.

== Background ==
After Pope Leo VIII had been deposed in 964 by the rival pope John XII in the Synod of Rome, Leo had fled and sought sanctuary with the Holy Roman Emperor Otto I. After John's death on 14 May 964, the Roman nobles elected Pope Benedict V in his place. The emperor Otto besieged Rome and on 23 June 964, he entered the city, accompanied by Leo VIII who, on Otto's orders convened a church council at the Lateran Palace. The council was under the presidency of the emperor; also present was Liutprand of Cremona, who chronicled the events of the council. Many of the prelates who had been present for the previous two synods which had in turn deposed Pope John XII and Leo VIII were also present at this council.

== Acts of the council ==
Benedict V, together with his clerical and lay supporters, was brought before the council on 23 June 964. Garbed in his pontifical robes, he was asked by the arch-deacon by what right did he assume the chair of Saint Peter whilst Leo was still living, especially as he had participated in the synod which had deposed John XII and had overseen Leo's election. He was also accused of having broken his oath to the emperor not to elect a pope without imperial consent.

Benedict responded by asking: “If I have sinned, have mercy on me”. The council then proceeded to confirm Leo as the true canonically appointed pope, and announced that Benedict was deposed as pope. On this sentence, Leo cut Benedict's pallium into two pieces and broke his pastoral staff, before tearing off his pontifical robes. It was only through Otto's intervention that Benedict was allowed to retain the rank of deacon.
