= Schola Cantorum (disambiguation) =

Schola Cantorum may refer to:

- Schola Cantorum Basiliensis, a music academy in Basel, Switzerland
- Schola Cantorum de Venezuela, a choir based in Venezuela
- Schola Cantorum (Italian vocal group), a vocal group based in Italy
- Schola Cantorum (Norwegian choir), a chamber choir based in Norway
- Schola Cantorum of Oxford, a chamber choir based at Oxford University in England
- Schola Cantorum de Paris, a musical academy based in France.
- Schola Cantorum of Rome, a Catholic choir based in Italy
- Schola Cantorum Stuttgart, Stuttgart, Germany
- Schola Cantorum, a choir formerly known as MacDowell Chorus and based in the United States
- University of Arkansas Schola Cantorum, a choir based at the University of Arkansas in the United States
