= Lateran =

Location in Rome

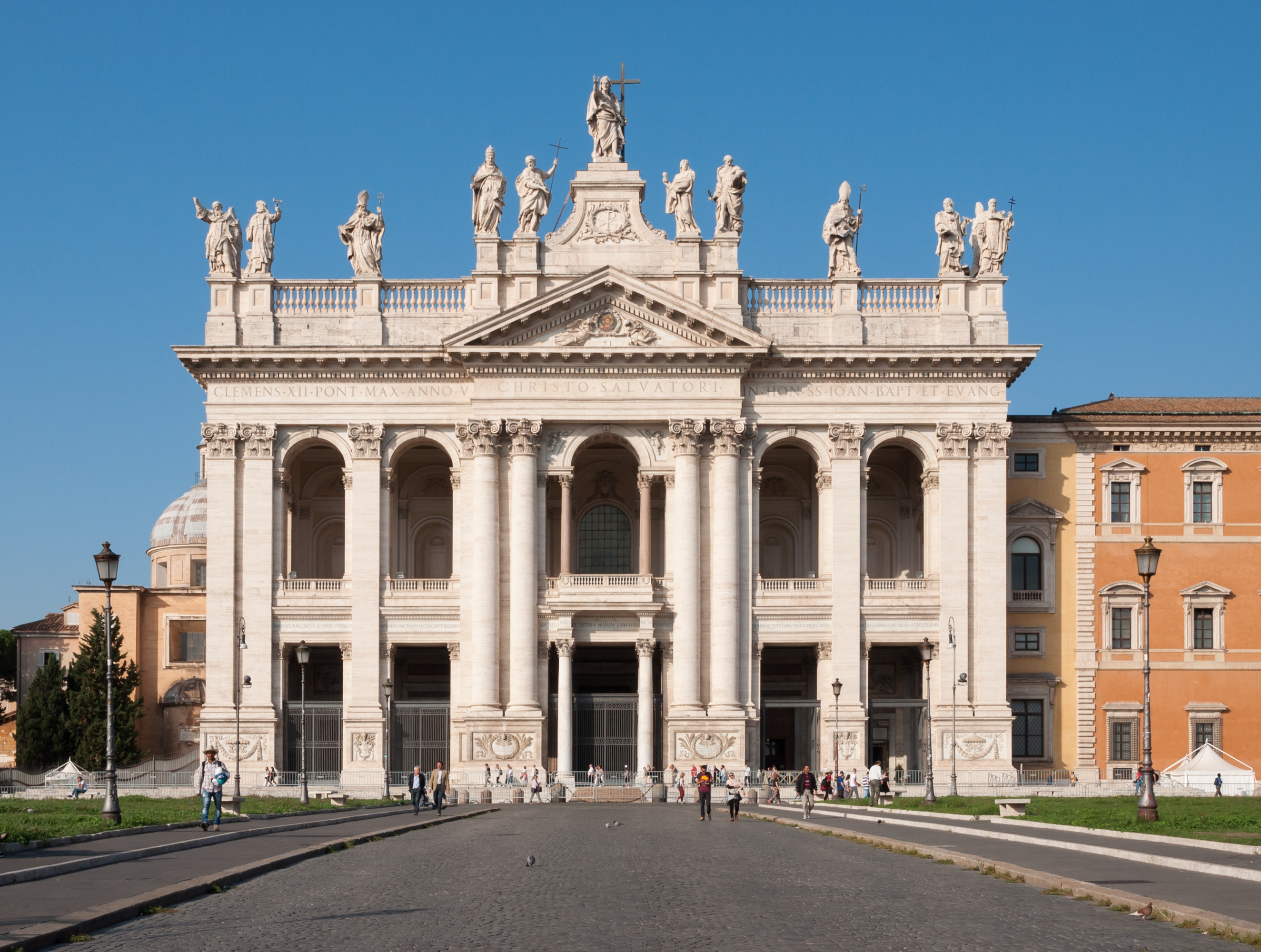
Late Baroque façade of the Archbasilica of Saint John Lateran, completed after a competition for the design by Alessandro Galilei in 1735

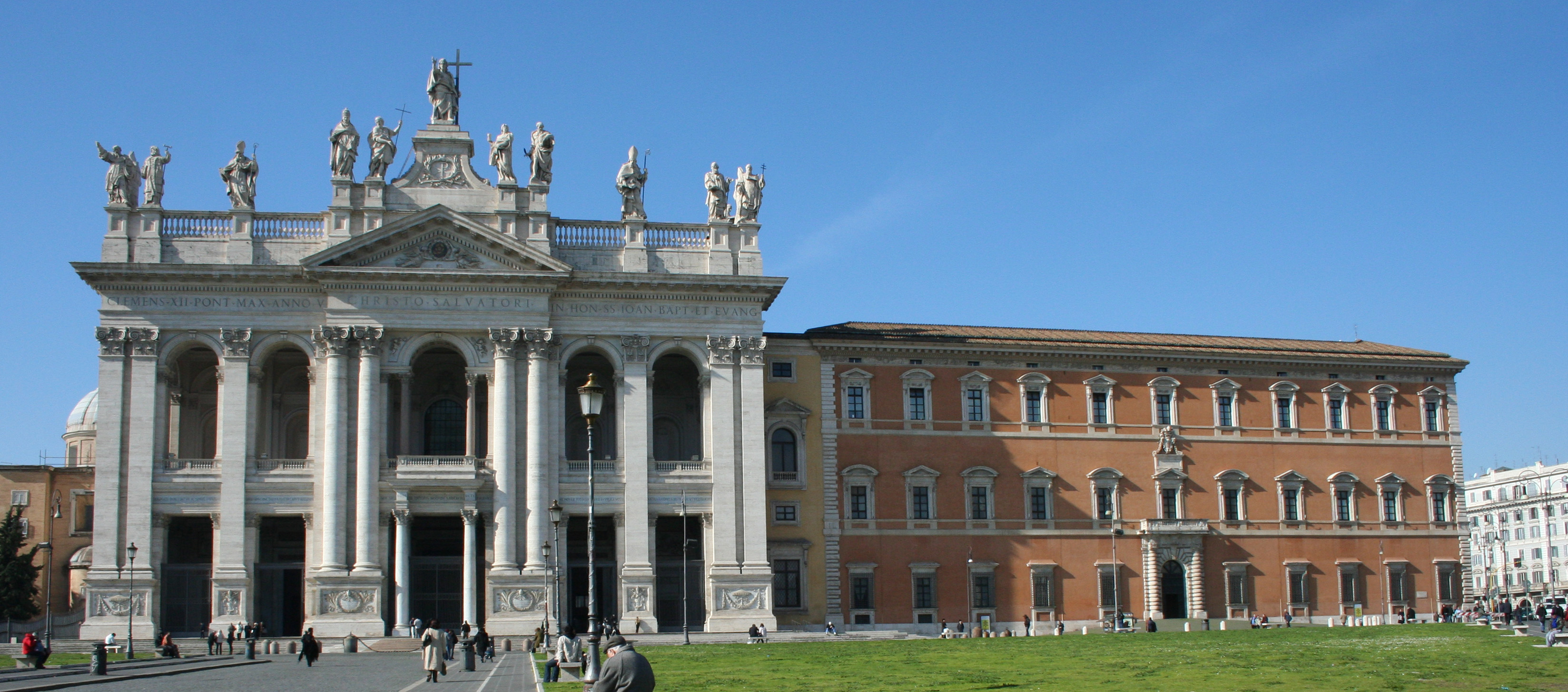
View showing Archbasilica and Palace

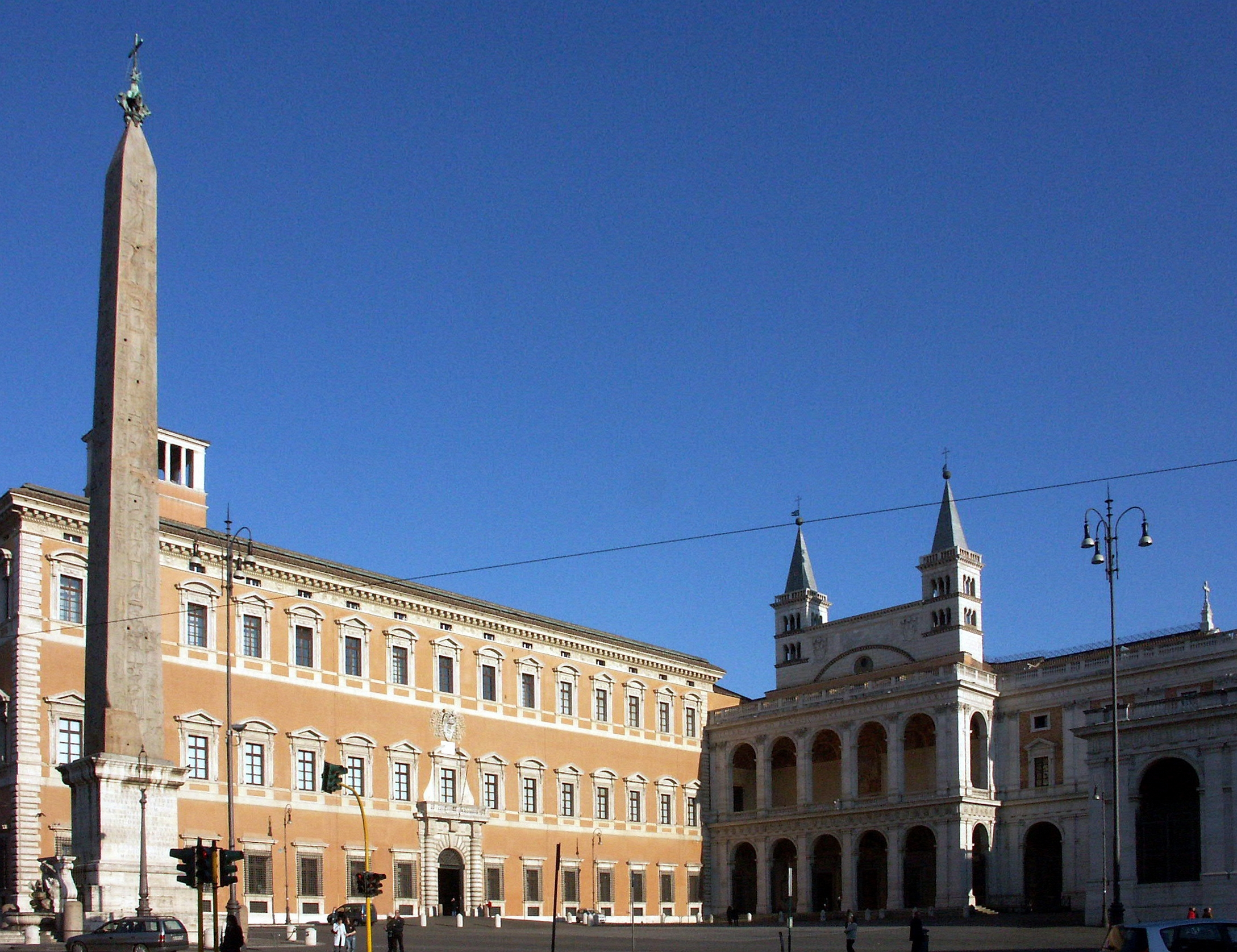
Basilica and Palace - side view, with the Lateran Obelisk

Lateran and Laterano are names for an area of Rome, and the shared names of several buildings in Rome. The properties were once owned by the Lateranus family of the Roman Empire. The Laterani lost their properties to Emperor Constantine who allegedly gave them to the Bishop of Rome though this traditional report has been most likely based on the document Donation of Constantine which has been proven to be a forgery.

The most famous Lateran buildings are the Lateran Palace, once called the Palace of the Popes, and the Archbasilica of Saint John Lateran, the cathedral of Rome, which while in Rome, and not in the Vatican, are properties of the Holy See, and have extraterritorial privileges as a result of the 1929 Lateran Treaty with Italy. As the official ecclesiastical seat of the pope, Saint John Lateran contains the papal cathedra. The Lateran is Christendom's earliest basilica.

Attached to the basilica is the Lateran Baptistery, one of the oldest in Christendom. Other constituent parts of the Lateran complex are the building of the Scala Sancta with the Sancta Sanctorum and the Triclinium of Pope Leo III.

Another basilica in the neighborhood is San Clemente al Laterano.

The Pontifical Lateran University, or simply Lateranum, is one of the pontifical universities of Rome. An ecclesiastical college in the Philippines was named after the Archbasilica of Saint John Lateran, the Colegio de San Juan de Letran, founded in 1620.

== History ==
The Lateran buildings played an important role in Catholic Church history. It (specifically the Lateran Palace) being the place where the First Council of the Lateran 1123, Second Council of the Lateran 1139, Third Council of the Lateran 1179, Fourth Council of the Lateran 1213, Fifth Council of the Lateran 1512–1517 took place.

1. The First Council of the Lateran (1123) followed and confirmed the concordat of Worms.
2. The Second Council of the Lateran (1139) declared clerical marriages invalid, regulated clerical dress, and punished attacks on clerics by excommunication.
3. The Third Council of the Lateran (1179) limited papal electors to the cardinals alone, condemned simony, and forbade the promotion of anyone to the episcopate before the age of thirty.
4. The Fourth Council of the Lateran (1215) dealt with transubstantiation, papal primacy, and conduct of clergy. It said Jews and Muslims should wear a special dress to distinguish them from Christians.
5. The Fifth Council of the Lateran (1512–1517) attempted reform of the church, including to make peace with Christian lands.

It also held non-ecumenical synods which are:

1. The Lateran Council of 649, organized by Maximus the Confessor, and called by Pope Theodore I to condemn the heresy of Monothelitism in the Church of the West.
2. The Lateran Council (769), called by Pope Stephen III to approve icon veneration in the East and thus condemn the heresy of Iconoclasm, deposed Antipope Constantine II, and increased cardinals rights in the Western Church.
3. The Lateran Council (964), was called to depose Pope Benedict V.

The Lateran is also where the Lateran Treaty was signed in 1929 establishing Vatican City as an independent state. It was signed by Benito Mussolini and Papal diplomat Pietro Gasparri.
