= Synod of Rome (963) =

Possibly uncanonical synod held in St. Peter's Basilica

The Synod of Rome (963) was a possibly uncanonical synod held in St. Peter's Basilica from 6 November until 4 December 963, under the authority of the Holy Roman Emperor, Otto I to depose Pope John XII. The events of the synod were recorded by Liutprand of Cremona.

== Background ==
John XII was one of a long line of popes elected in the period called by Church historian, Cardinal Baronius, the Saeculum obscurum ("the Dark Age") of the Papacy, when the Holy See was dominated by two courtesans of the family of the Counts of Tusculum, Theodora and Marozia. These two courtesans effectively ruled papal Rome and the Papal States and dominated papal elections ensuring that only their lovers, family and allies were elected pope.

Marozia, born Maria and also known as Mariuccia or Mariozza (c. 890 – 937), was a Roman noblewoman who was the alleged mistress of Pope Sergius III and was given the unprecedented titles senatrix ("senatoress") and patricia of Rome by Pope John X.

Edward Gibbon wrote that the "influence of two sister prostitutes, Marozia and Theodora, was founded on their wealth and beauty, their political and amorous intrigues: the most strenuous of their lovers were rewarded with the Roman tiara, and their reign may have suggested to darker ages the fable of a female pope. The bastard son, two grandsons, two great grandsons, and one great great grandson of Marozia — a rare genealogy — were seated in the Chair of St Peter." Pope John XII was her grandson. From this description, the term "pornocracy" has become associated with the effective rule in Rome of Theodora and Marozia, through their male surrogates.

Marozia was born about 890. She was the daughter of the Roman consul Theophylact, Count of Tusculum, and of Theodora, the real power in Rome, whom Liutprand of Cremona characterized as a "shameless whore... [who] exercised power on the Roman citizenry like a man."

Pope John XII, in imitation, also led a shameless and corrupt life, according to Liutprand of Cremona who records that he "turned the papal court into a brothel". According to Liutprand, Pope John XII was eventually murdered by his mistress's husband In flagrante delicto.

Pope John was repeatedly warned about his corrupt misuse of papal power and his misconduct of the Papacy by the Holy Roman Emperor, Otto I the Great, who threatened to bring his army to Rome from Frankfurt, then the imperial headquarters, and rectify the situation.

In the middle of 963, Pope John XII had been in communication with Emperor Otto regarding the emperor's concerns over John's pontificate, and the pope's meddling in the conflict between Otto and Berengar II, King of Italy. When Otto learned that John had allowed Berengar's son Adalbert into Rome, he marched on the city. After defending Rome and driving Otto back to the Tiber River, John fled the city and took refuge in Tibur. Otto then entered Rome on 2 November 963. After reminding the clergy and nobility that they were not canonically permitted to ordain, or even elect, a pope without the imperial consent, and compelling them to renew that oath, on 6 November 963 Otto convened a synod in St Peter's to deal with the irregularity of Pope John XII and his misconduct of the Papacy.

It was the special prerogative of the Roman Emperor to convoke, set the agenda of, and preside over, councils of the Church and the first eight Ecumenical Councils of the Church were so convoked and presided over by the Roman Emperor. Thus Otto's claim to call a Synod to deal with the crisis was entirely legal and canonical. The real issue, subsequently, for the theologians was not his right so to call a Synod but whether such a Synod could declare a pope self-deposed for crime alone or whether, as later Doctors of the Church have held, the self-deposition should arise from heresy. There is consensus among the Doctors that a pope may be declared self-deposed for heresy but whether he can be declared self-deposed solely for crime is an open question. The Synod of Rome of 963 declared Pope John XII self-deposed for crime.

== Acts of the Synod ==
After convening the Synod, Otto appointed John, the Bishop of Narni and John, the Cardinal-Deacon to act as the pope's accusers, while Liutprand of Cremona, the emperor's secretary, responded to the Romans on behalf of the emperor.

Firstly, Pope John XII was called forth to present himself before the council. As he was not present, Emperor Otto declared: “It appears to us just that the accusations should be set forth one by one; then what we should do can be decided on by common advice.”

At this point John of Narni declared that he had seen Pope John XII ordain a deacon in a stable, and out of the appointed times. Another cardinal-priest bore witness that he had seen him celebrate Mass without communicating. Others accused him of murder and perjury, of sacrilege, of incest with members of his own family, including his sisters. They accused him of simony, of consecrating a ten-year-old child as Bishop of Todi, of converting the Lateran Palace into a brothel, of a life mostly spent hunting, of unjustly ordering men to be mutilated, of arson and of wearing armour and training for war and battle. Finally, they declared that he drank a toast to the Devil, and while playing at dice invoked the name of Jupiter, Venus and other pagan gods.

The Synod then drafted a letter to John XII, detailing the charges against him, and asking him to come to Rome to answer the accusations. The letter promised that nothing would be done that was contrary to canon law. John responded by threatening to excommunicate anyone involved in raising a new pope while he still lived. The Synod met again on 22 November and drafted a new letter to the pope, declaring that if he did not present himself to the Synod, he himself would be excommunicated. But the bearers of this letter could not locate John XII who had gone into hiding.

According to canon law, an accused bishop must be summoned three times; the Emperor satisfied himself with two citations. Therefore, on 4 December, the Synod met for the final time. In the absence of John XII (who was apparently hunting in the Catanian hills), the emperor recited the arraignment that the pope was a criminal and a traitor. He then turned to the Synod and announced, “Now let the holy Synod pronounce what it decides upon the matter.” The Synod responded by declaring “We therefore beg your Imperial Highness to drive away from the Holy Roman Church this monster, unredeemed from his vices by any virtue, and to allow another to be put in his place, who may merit by the example of a good conversation to preside over us.” Otto then proposed Leo the Protonotary as a possible successor to John XII, and, no other candidate being put forward, the Synod voted and elected him. The Synod was then closed by the Emperor.

== Canonical status of the synod ==
The acts of the Synod were condemned at a new synod held the following year, since, after Emperor Otto had left Rome to return to Frankfurt with his army, Pope John XII, with his remaining supporters, returned to Rome, overthrew Pope Leo VIII, excommunicated all involved in the Synod, ordering many of them to be mutilated, and Pope John XII held his own synod to declare the acts of the Synod invalid. However, if the Synod of 963 is accepted as valid, John was no longer the true and valid pope, his acts and new synod were therefore themselves invalid. Shortly thereafter Pope John XII died on 14 May 964, at the age of 27, seemingly in the manner described by Liutprand of Cremona.

Some continue to argue that some of the acts of the Synod were invalid.

== Composition of the synod ==
Present along with the Holy Roman Emperor were the following prelates:

=== Italy ===
- The Deacon Rodalph, representing the Patriarch of Aquileia, the highest ecclesiastical authority in the west after the pope.
- Walpert, Archbishop of Milan
- Peter IV, Archbishop of Ravenna
- Hubertus, Bishop of Parma
- Liutprand, Bishop of Cremona
- Sico, Bishop of Ostia
- Teophylactus, Bishop of Praeneste
- Benedictus, Bishop of Silva Portus
- Giovanni, Bishop of Sabina
- Leo I, Bishop of Velletri-Segni
- The Bishop of Albano
- The bishop of Silva Candida
- The Bishop of Gabium
- The Bishop of Forum Claudii
- The Bishop of Bleda
- The Bishop of Nepi
- The Bishop of Caere
- The Bishop of Tibur
- The Bishop of Alatri
- The Bishop of Anagni
- The Bishop of Treviso
- The Bishop of Ferentino
- The Bishop of Norma
- The Bishop of Veroli
- The Bishop of Sutri
- The Bishop of Narni
- The Bishop of Gallese
- The Bishop of Falerii
- The Bishop of Orta
- The Bishop of Terracina

=== Germany and West Francia ===
- Adaldag, Archbishop of Hamburg-Bremen
- Landward, Bishop of Minden
- Otgar, Bishop of Speyer

=== Cardinal-priests ===
There were 13 cardinal priests who attended the synod, one of whom was the future Pope Benedict V. An unknown number had fled with Pope John XII. Their Titular churches were:

- Santa Balbina
- Basilica di Sant'Anastasia al Palatino
- San Lorenzo in Damaso
- San Crisogono
- Santa Susanna
- Saint Equitius
- Saint Pammachius
- Saint Calixtus
- Santa Cecilia in Trastevere
- San Lorenzo in Lucina
- San Sisto Vecchio
- Santi Quattro Coronati
- Santa Sabina

=== Other participants ===
Present were all of the officers of the papal court, as well as deacons, Regionarii, notaries and the Primicerius of the Schola cantorum. Also present were a gathering of Roman nobles, who were aligned to the imperial party. These included:

- Stephen, son of John the Superista
- Demetrius, son of Meliosus
- Crescentius of the Marble Horse
- Giovanni de Mizina
- Stephano de Imiza
- Theodorus de Rufina
- Giovanni de Primicerio
- Leo de Cazunuli
- Pietro de Cannapara
- Benedict and his son Bulgamin

The Roman plebeians were represented by the heads of the Roman militia, led by Peter Imperiola. The emperor himself was also accompanied by a number of dukes and counts of Germany and Italy.
