= Synod of Rome (964) =

The Synod of Rome (964) was a synod held in St. Peter’s Basilica from 26 to 28 February 964, for the purpose of condemning the Synod of Rome (963) and to depose Pope Leo VIII.

== Background ==
After Pope John XII had been deposed in 963 by the Holy Roman Emperor, Otto I in the Synod of Rome, Pope Leo VIII had been elected as his successor. However, once Otto had left Rome, the Roman nobility rebelled and drove out Leo who sought sanctuary with the emperor. John XII quickly returned and convened a synod for the purpose of ruling Leo’s election as uncanonical.

== Acts of the synod ==
The council met on 26 February 964, and it proceeded to hold three sessions. Present were John XII, sixteen Italian bishops (eleven of whom had been present at the synod of 963 which had deposed John), twelve cardinal-priests (most of whom had also been present, including the future Pope Benedict V), as well as a large number of the lower clergy present in Rome at the time.

John opened the first session, addressing the council in the following terms:

”You know, dearly beloved brethren, that by the power of the emperor I was expelled from my see for two months. I ask you then if, according to the canons, that can be called a synod which was held in my absence in my church on December 4 by the Emperor Otto and his archbishops and bishops?”

When the synod declared that the previous synod was not carried out in accordance with canon law, the previous synod was condemned. Next, the actions of Sico, Bishop of Ostia, in rapidly ordaining and consecrating Leo VIII, were condemned, and he was asked to present himself at the third session for judgement. John then passed a sentence on Leo:

”By the authority of God Almighty, of the Princes of the Apostles, Peter and Paul, of the ecumenical councils and by the judgment of the Holy Spirit pronounced by us, may Leo, one of the employees of our curia, a neophyte, and a man who has broken his troth to us, be deprived of all clerical honours; and if, hereafter, he should again attempt to sit on the apostolic throne, or perform any sacerdotal function, let him be anathematised along with his aiders and abettors, and, except in danger of death, not receive the sacred body of Our Lord Jesus Christ.”

Then those who had been ordained by Leo were introduced before the synod, and were made to sign a paper that their ordinations were invalid. They were then reduced back to the rank they had held prior to Leo’s ordination.

In the second session, the two men who helped at the consecration of Leo, Benedictus, the Bishop of Silva Portus and the Bishop of Albano, both acknowledged their guilt in the uncanonical election of Leo. Then in the final session, as Bishop Sico had not presented himself, he was degraded from the rank of bishop. Finally, in a matter not related to the elevation of Leo, the synod also ruled that laypeople were forbidden to take a place on the sanctuary during the celebration of the Mass.

After the synod, John XII ordered the mutilation of John, the Cardinal-Deacon, who had been one of his chief accusers at the synod which had condemned him, ordering him to lose his nose, tongue and two of his fingers. John also ordered that the Protoscriniar Azzo have his hand amputated, and for Otgar, Bishop of Speyer, to be scourged.

== Aftermath ==
On 14 May 964, John XII died, and the Roman nobles elected Pope Benedict V in his place. The emperor Otto besieged Rome and on 23 June 964, he entered the city, accompanied by Leo VIII who convened a council at the Lateran Palace.
