= Pope Benedict V =

Head of the Catholic Church in 964

- Bishop of Rome
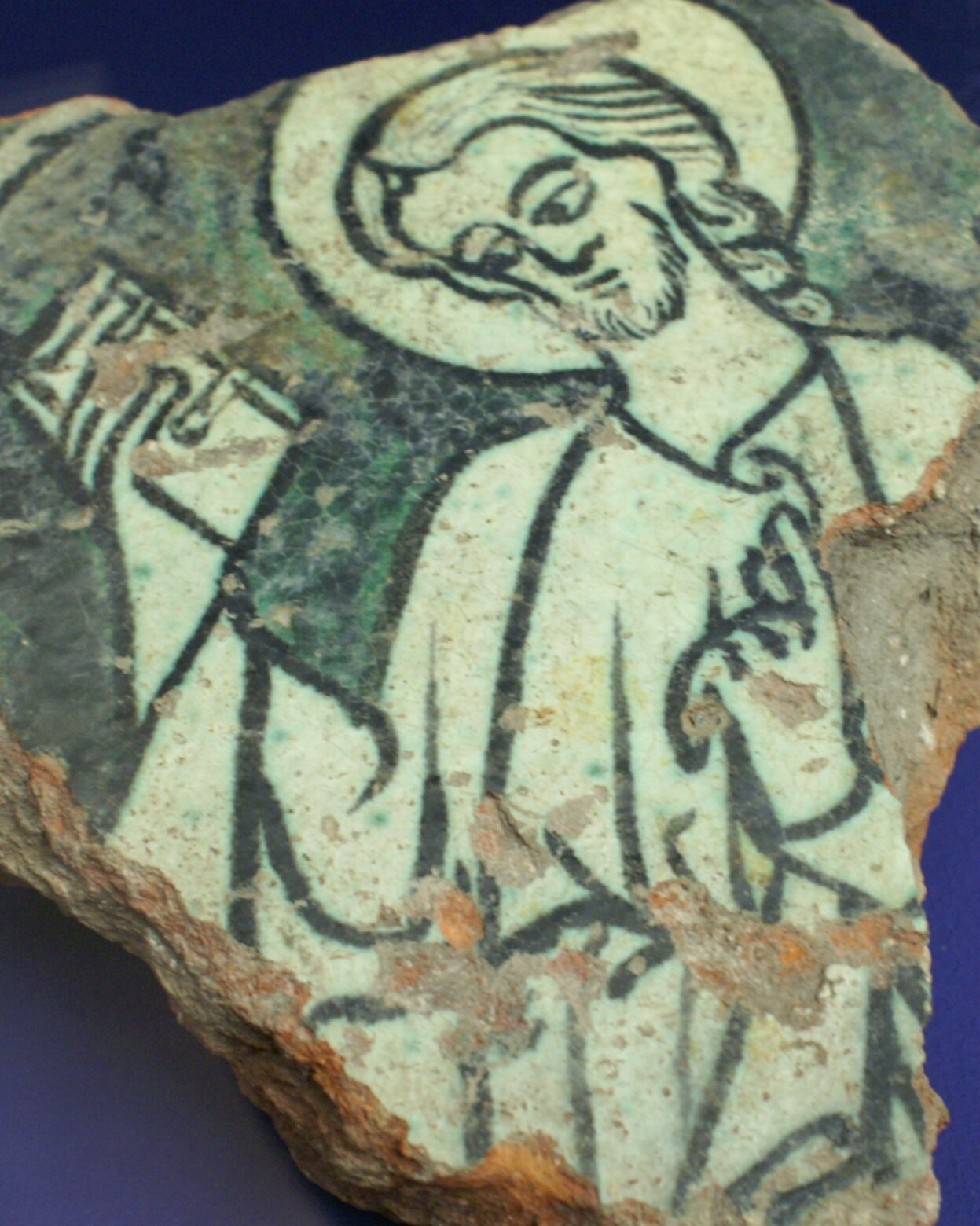
- Miniature of Benedict V in a fragment from his grave monument
- Church: Catholic Church
- Papacy began: 22 May 964
- Papacy ended: 23 June 964
- Predecessor: John XII
- Successor: Leo VIII

Orders
- Created cardinal: February 964 by Pope John XII

Personal details
- Born: Rome, Papal States
- Died: 4 July 965 Hamburg, Holy Roman Empire

Pope Benedict V (Latin: Benedictus V; died 4 July 965) was the pope and ruler of the Papal States from 22 May to 23 June 964, in opposition to Leo VIII. He was overthrown by Emperor Otto I. His brief pontificate occurred at the end of a period known as the Saeculum obscurum.

== Early career ==
Benedict was the son of a Roman called John, and was born and raised in Rome around the vicinity of the Theatre of Marcellus. As cardinal-deacon, Benedict was renowned for his learning, for which his contemporaries gave him the additional name of Grammaticus. He was also a notarius and took part in the deposition of Pope John XII by the Holy Roman emperor, Otto I, and the subsequent election of Otto's candidate, Pope Leo VIII.

== Election ==
The Roman people, unhappy with the election of Leo VIII as pope, recalled John XII. John convened a synod which condemned Leo, in which Benedict took part. However, with John's death, the Roman people again rejected Leo, who fled from Rome and joined Otto at Rieti in central Italy. After a violent struggle between rival factions, the Romans elected Benedict instead, who was acclaimed by the city militia. Prior to his coronation as pope, envoys were sent to Otto, informing them of their decision. The emperor rejected their decision out of hand and warned them not to proceed. Returning to Rome, they decided to ignore Otto; Benedict was consecrated bishop and crowned pope on 22 May 964. The Romans swore an oath to Benedict that they would not abandon him and would protect him against Otto.

Otto however, upon hearing the news, resolved to restore his candidate as pope. He marched and proceeded to besiege Rome, blockading it so that no one was able to leave the city. The result was famine, as the land around the city was ravaged, and a single modius of bran cost thirty denarii. Although Benedict tried to bolster morale by encouraging the defenders from the walls of the city, as well as threatening to excommunicate the emperor and his army, the Romans soon decided to capitulate. Opening the gates to Otto, they handed Benedict over to him on 23 June 964.

== Overthrow ==
Together with his clerical and lay supporters, and clad in his pontifical robes, Benedict was brought before a synod which Leo had convened. Benedict was asked by the archdeacon how he dared to assume the chair of Saint Peter while Leo was still alive. He was also accused of having broken his oath to the emperor, where he promised never to elect a pope without the emperor's consent. Benedict responded: “If I have sinned, have mercy on me.” Having received a promise from the emperor that his life would be spared if he submitted, Benedict threw himself at Leo's feet and acknowledged his guilt.

The synod revoked his episcopal consecration, his pallium was torn from him, and his pastoral staff was broken over him by Leo. However, through the intercession of Otto, he was allowed to retain the rank of deacon. Otto left Rome sometime after 29 June 964, taking Benedict with him. After some delay, he was taken to Germany in early 965. The ex-Pope was moved to Hamburg and placed under the care of Adaldag, Archbishop of Hamburg-Bremen. His period of exile was brief; Adam of Bremen noted:

”The archbishop [Adaldag] kept him with great honour till his death; for he is said to have been both holy and learned and worthy of the Apostolic See. . . . And so living a holy life with us, and teaching others how to live well, he at length died a happy death just when the Romans had come to ask the emperor that he might be restored.”

Although he was treated well by Archbishop Adaldag, many others considered him an antipope, and attempted to keep him ostracised. Archbishop Libentius I (the successor of Adaldag) commented:

”When the Lord Pope Benedict was an exile in these parts, I sought him out; and though every effort was made to prevent my going to him, I would never allow myself to be influenced against the Pope. But, as long as he lived, I closely adhered to him.”

== Death and burial ==
Benedict died on 4 July 965 and was buried in the cathedral in Hamburg. Then sometime before the year 988, his remains were transferred to Rome, but where they were interred is unknown. A legend has it that Benedict prophesied his relocation to Rome, and the devastation of Hamburg by King Mstivoj of the Obodrites in 983:

"Here must my frail body return to dust. After my death all this country will be devastated by the sword of the heathen and be abandoned to wild beasts. Nor will the land experience solid peace till my translation. But when I am taken home, I trust that, by the intercession of the apostle, the pagan ravages will cease."

== See also ==
- List of shortest-reigning popes

== Notes ==
Catholic Church titles
Preceded by Leo VIII	Pope; 964	Succeeded by John XIII
