= University of Arkansas Schola Cantorum =

University choir

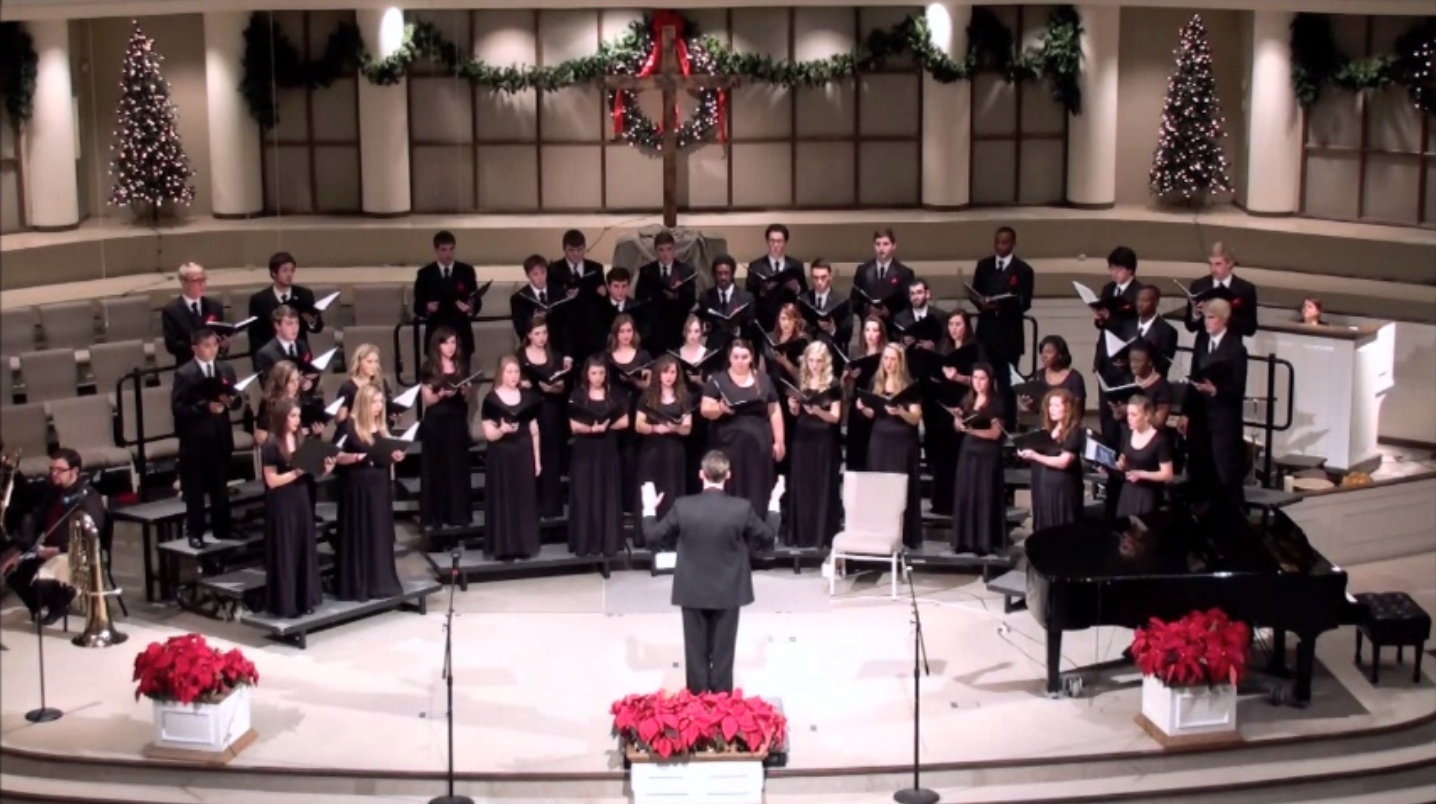
Schola Cantorum singing at the 2012 Winterfest concert in Fayetteville, AR

The University of Arkansas Schola Cantorum is a choir ensemble at the University of Arkansas. Founded in 1957, Schola Cantorum has performed both domestically and internationally.

Currently, Schola Cantorum is under the direction of Dr. Stephen Caldwell. The 2019-2020 ensemble consisted of 49 undergraduate and graduate students from various disciplines at the University of Arkansas, selected by audition. Schola Cantorum performs a variety of musical styles, from German Baroque cantatas to opera choruses and modern a cappella works. The choir also frequently collaborates with other university ensembles, including the University Symphony Orchestra, Wind Ensemble, and Wind Symphony. Schola Cantorum regularly appears at both the Faulkner Performing Arts Center and Walton Arts Center in Fayetteville, AR, and often tours throughout the state and abroad.

== History ==
=== World premiers ===
1982 – Isabella Leonarda's Messa Prima

2011 – Augusta Read Thomas' Floating Temples

=== Conductors ===
2012 – present – Dr. Stephen Caldwell
