= Pope Leo VIII =

Head of the Catholic Church from 964 to 965

- Bishop of Rome
- Church: Catholic Church
- Papacy began: 6 December 963 (as antipope); 23 June 964 (as pope)
- Papacy ended: 26 February 964 (as antipope); 1 March 965 (as pope)
- Predecessor: Benedict V
- Successor: John XIII

Personal details
- Born: Leo c. 915 Rome, Papal States
- Died: 1 March 965 (aged c. 50) Rome, Papal States
- Parents: John

Pope Leo VIII (c. 915 – 1 March 965) was a Roman prelate who claimed the Holy See from 963 until 964 in opposition to John XII and Benedict V and again from 23 June 964 to his death. Today, he is considered by the Catholic Church to have been an antipope during the first period and the legitimate pope during the second. An appointee of Holy Roman Emperor Otto I, Leo VIII's pontificate occurred after the period known as the saeculum obscurum.

== Early life ==
Born in Rome in the region around the Clivus Argentarius, Leo came from an illustrious noble family. He was the son of John, who held the office of protonotary. Although a layperson, he was the protoscriniarius (or superintendent of the Roman public schools for scribes) in the papal court during the pontificate of John XII. In 963, he was included in a party that John sent to the newly crowned Holy Roman emperor, Otto I, who was besieging the deposed King Berengar II of Italy at the castle of St. Leo in Umbria. His instructions were to reassure the emperor that the pope was determined to correct the abuses of the papal court, as well as protest Otto's actions in demanding that cities in the Papal States take an oath of fidelity to the emperor instead of the pope.

== Struggle for papacy ==
By the time Otto entered Rome to depose Pope John XII, Leo had been appointed protonotary to the Apostolic See. A synod convened by the emperor uncanonically deposed John XII (who had fled to Tibur). It proceeded to elect Leo VIII, who was the emperor's nominee, as pope on 4 December 963. Since Leo was still a layman, he was ordained as ostiarius, lector, acolyte, subdeacon, deacon and priest in the space of a day by Sico, the cardinal-bishop of Ostia, who then proceeded to consecrate him as bishop on 6 December 963. The deposed John, however, still had a large body of sympathisers within Rome; he offered large bribes to the Roman nobility if they would rise up and overthrow Otto and kill Leo, and so, in early January 964, the Roman people staged an uprising that was quickly put down by Otto's troops. Leo, hoping to reach out to the Roman nobility, persuaded Otto to release the hostages he had taken from the leading Roman families in exchange for their continued good behaviour. However, once Otto left Rome around 12 January 964, the Romans again rebelled, and caused Leo to flee Rome and take refuge with Otto sometime in February 964.

John XII returned, and in February convened a synod which in turn deposed Leo on 26 February 964, with John excommunicating Leo in the process. Leo remained with Otto, and, with the death of John XII in May 964, the Romans elected Benedict V. Otto proceeded to besiege Rome, taking Leo with him, and when the Romans eventually surrendered to Otto, Leo was reinstalled in the Lateran Palace as Pope.

The former pope was brought before Leo with Benedict's clerical and lay supporters and clad in his pontifical robes. Benedict was asked how he dared to assume the chair of Saint Peter while Leo was still alive. Benedict responded, "If I have sinned, have mercy on me." Having received a promise from the emperor that his life would be spared if he submitted, Benedict threw himself at Leo's feet and acknowledged his guilt. Brought before a synod convened by Leo, Benedict's episcopal ordination was revoked, his pallium was torn from him, and his pastoral staff was broken over him by Leo. However, through the intercession of Otto, Benedict was allowed to retain the rank of deacon. Then, after having the Roman nobility swear an oath over the Tomb of Saint Peter to obey and be faithful to Leo, Otto departed Rome in late June 964.

== Pontificate ==
Having been crowned by Otto, the remainder of Leo's pontificate was reasonably trouble-free. He issued numerous bulls, many of which detailed granting privileges to Otto and his successors. Some of the bulls were alleged to grant the Holy Roman emperors the right to choose their successors in the Kingdom of Italy and the right to nominate the pope, and all popes, archbishops, and bishops were to receive investiture from the emperor. In addition, Leo is also claimed to have relinquished to Otto all the territory of the Papal States that had been granted to the Apostolic See by Pepin the Short and Charlemagne. Although Leo certainly granted various concessions to his imperial patron, it is now believed that the "investiture" bulls associated with Leo were, if not completely fabricated during the Investiture Controversy, at the very least so tampered with that it is now largely impossible to reconstruct them in their original form.

Leo VIII died on 1 March 965 and was succeeded by John XIII. The Liber Pontificalis described him as venerable, energetic, and honourable. He had some streets dedicated to him in and around the Clivus Argentarius, including the descensus Leonis Prothi.

== Historiography ==
Although Leo was considered an antipope for many years, his current status is still confusing. The Annuario Pontificio makes the following point about the pontificate of Leo VIII:

At this point, as again in the mid-eleventh century, we come across elections in which problems of harmonizing historical criteria and those of theology and canon law make it impossible to decide clearly which side possessed the legitimacy whose factual existence guarantees the unbroken lawful succession of the Successors of Saint Peter. The uncertainty that in some cases results has made it advisable to abandon the assignation of successive numbers in the list of the Popes.

Due to Leo's uncanonical original election, it is now accepted that, at least until the deposition of Benedict V, he was almost certainly an antipope. The deposition of John XII was almost certainly invalid, as John did not acquiesce, so the election of Benedict V almost certainly was canonical. However, if Benedict did consent to his deposition as Liutprand of Cremona (who chronicled the events of this period) wrote, and if, as seems certain, no further protest was made against Leo's position, it has been the consensus of historians that he may be regarded as a true pope from July 964 to his death in 965. The fact that no one else attempted to claim the papacy during this time and that the next pope to assume the name Leo was consecrated Leo IX also seems to indicate that he is a true pope.

== Notes ==
Catholic Church titles
Preceded by John XII	Pope; 964–965	Succeeded by Benedict V
