= Schola Cantorum of Rome =

Medieval papal choir

The Schola Cantorum was the trained papal choir during the Middle Ages, specializing in the performance of plainchant for the purpose of rendering the music in church. In the fourth century, Pope Sylvester I was said to have inaugurated the first Schola Cantorum, but it was Pope Gregory I who established the school on a firm basis and endowed it. The choir ranged anywhere from twenty to thirty boys or men. Only the most skilled in singing were selected to participate in the Schola Cantorum.

== Early Christian Church ==
Peace between the Church and the Roman Empire greatly affected the liturgical life and musical practice of Christians. In the fourth century AD, Constantine became the first Roman emperor to convert to Christianity. This conversion led to the proclamation of the Edict of Milan, which decreed religious tolerance throughout the empire. With more and more converts, it was clear that services could no longer be conducted in the informal manner of the early days. This freedom in religion allowed the church to build for large basilicas which made it possible for public worship and for Christians to finally assume a new dignity. Music, in particular had its own place in these newly constructed basilicas. As the early church of Jerusalem spread westward to Western Europe, it brought along musical elements from diverse areas. It was during this time that the Schola Cantorum made its first appearance at the service of liturgical celebration.

== Schools of singers ==
The Lombards, Franks, and Goths dominated the face of Western Europe in the seventh and early eighth centuries. The idea of unity and centralization was simply unknown during this time so local churches were relatively independent. Each region of the West probably received the Eastern heritage of musical elements in a slightly different form. This caused each region to produce several distinct liturgies and bodies of liturgical music of its own. Although each region shared the same language of Latin, they had different texts and music. We know for certain that there existed Beneventan chant, Roman Chant, Ambrosian chant, Hispanic chant, and several types of Gallican chant. Each of these political divisions developed their own repertory of melodies for singing sacred texts.

== Papal choir ==
The first Schola Cantorum of Rome was said to be founded by Pope Sylvester in the year of 314. Music evolved from a simple unison chant to a highly developed polyphonic choral style. Singing was usually performed by the clergy, however in 367, the Council of Laodicea banned congregational singing and placed the musical service in the hands of the trained choir. With trained singers for the musical part of the liturgy, the clergy could focus their attention to what was most important, and that was their office.

Pope Sylvester’s Schola Cantorum of Rome was instituted for the study of chants, not for the vocal technique. Chanting in unity was an obvious and a must, but it did not take long for Sylvester to realize that they needed to impart some sort of style onto it. In this, the subject of uniformity was taken up and this inevitably led to the management of breath, which led to the discovery of the fundamental elements of vocal technique. The school of Sylvester demanded that chants were to be sung in a perfectly smooth, flowing kind of melody. Instructors often pushed their pupils to their limits, as they recognized that pure legato was essential in perfecting the chant.

The employment of professional singers in the church played a prominent role in the development of the simple plain chant. The singers had mastered a style united with a technical finish of elegance and began to flourish their singing with ornamentation which had existed during classical times. These chants were not easy, nor sung in a dull and monotonous manner. The singers filled them with great richness and variety. This employment of trained singers acted as a precursor to the institution which was later reorganized by Pope Gregory I. The purpose of the schola was to teach both singing techniques and the plainsong repertory learned by the oral tradition. However, it was Pope Gregory I who standardized the liturgical repertory on a firm basis. This Roman school lasted a period of nine years which furnished the choir at most of the papal functions and was facilitated by the cantor.

== Schola Cantorum ==
When Pope Gregory I was elected pope of the Roman Catholic Church in 590, he founded the Schola Cantorum. This was the school of singers which established the authoritative delivery of the musical liturgy for all of Europe. Of the schools that were directed by the church, pupils with the best voices were chosen for training in the Schola Cantorum. The most talented pupil was called paraphonist and was responsible for singing the solos of the “alleluia”. The studies of the Schola Cantorum lasted a total of nine years. It was a long period because the school made it mandatory for pupils to memorize the chants. During service, only the director or the paraphonists was permitted to have a book.

The ensemble consisted of anywhere between twenty and thirty boys or men. Women were not allowed to be a part of the Schola Cantorum. This group of boys and men had to have their head shaved and wore chasubles. The choir, clergy, and congregation, sang the ensembles of the service, leaving the most important parts of the service for the trained vocalists. The chant maintained its dominance in ecclesiastic music up until the rise of polyphony in the eleventh century. The idea of two or more simultaneous lines of independent melody accompanied by high and low pitched voices seemed more suitable for ecclesiastic music in the eleventh century. The polyphonic composition was constantly developing up until the seventeenth century when opera began to dominate the musical world of the church.

== Influence ==
From Rome, the institution spread to other parts of the Church. When the pope visited France with his court, the Frankish King Pepin the Short could not help but admire the customs of Roman liturgy. Pepin realized that these customs could help to ensure religious unity throughout his territories and thus strengthen their political unity. The King therefore adopted the Roman liturgy and mixed it with the Gallican chant repertory. The overall structure of the Roman chant was accepted by the Gallican musicians, but they covered it with a completely different style of ornamentation. The fusion of Roman and Gallican chant evolved into what we now know as Gregorian chant.

Charlemagne, the son of Pepin, was also impressed by the superiority of the Roman chanters. He begged Pope Adrian I to assign him two cantors of the Gregorian school. Peter and Romanus were sent out to Francia in 789. Unfortunately, Romanus fell sick and remained behind, but Peter was able to make it to Metz and established a school of Gregorian chant. Nonetheless, the Schola Cantorum played a significant role in the transmission of Roman chant to the Carolingian court of Charlemagne. Several schools were also established in England shortly after the fusion of Roman and Gallican chant.

Between the years 876 and 1073, the prior of the Schola is recorded to have performed a curious dance with clearly pagan origins known as Cornomania, on the Saturday following Easter, on the Lateran Square in Rome. He would wear a wreath with horns on his head, swing a rattle with bells, scatter laurel leaves, and cry out in an unknown language, "Iaritan, iaritan, iariariasti; raphayn, iercoin, iariariasti".

Several institutions today have modeled themselves after the medieval Schola, including Schola Cantorum Basiliensis of Basel and the Schola Cantorum de Paris. They aim to interpret classical, old popular, sacred, and of course Gregorian music with absolute purity of style and tone.

== See also ==
- Schola Cantorum (disambiguation)
