= Liutprand of Cremona =

Italian historian, diplomat, and bishop of Cremona (920–972)

Most Reverend Liutprand of Cremona
- Bishop of Cremona
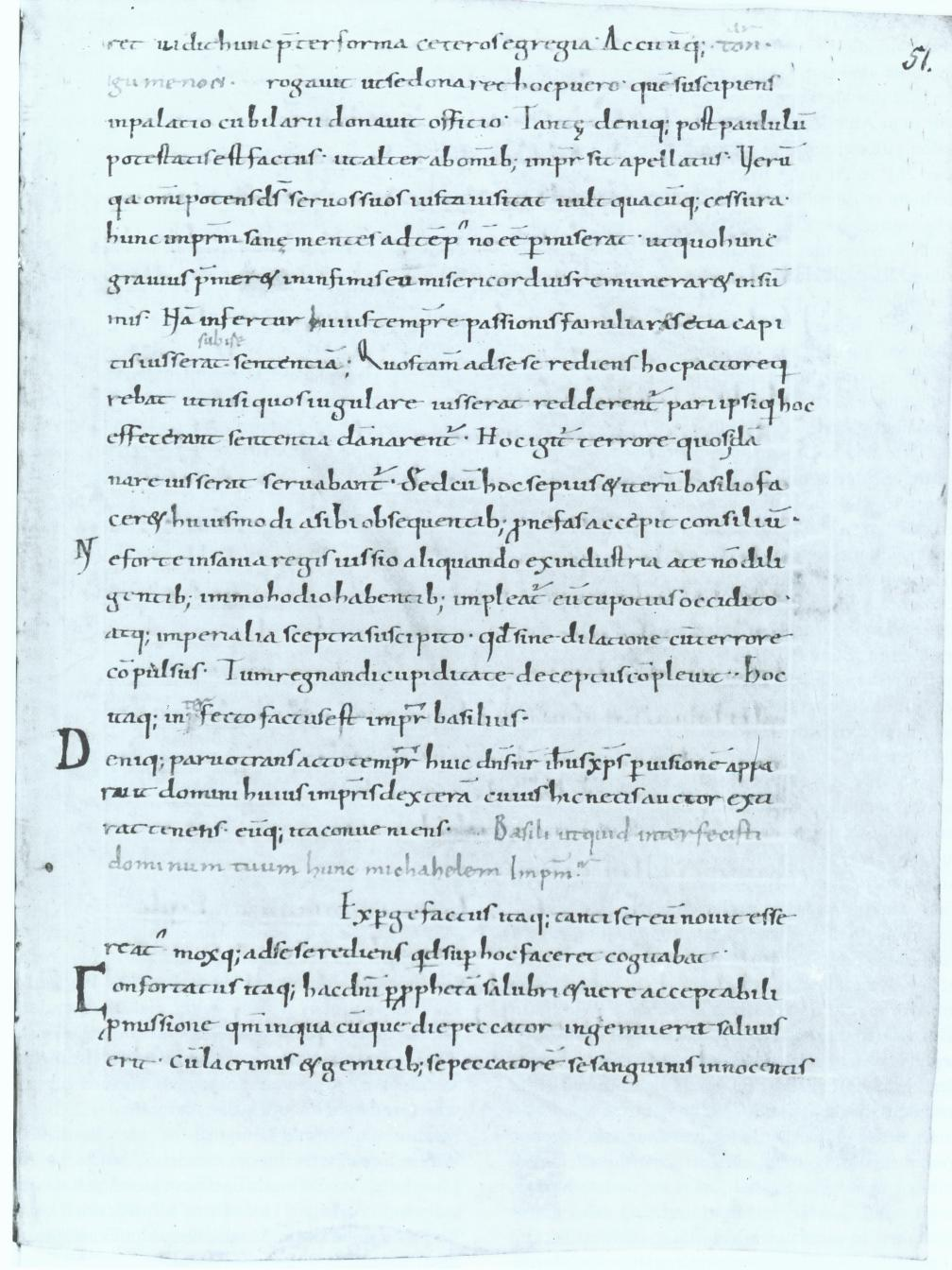
- Liudprand of Cremona, Antapodosis (detail from III, c. 32-34) Northern Italy, second half of the 10th century. Munich, Bavarian State Library, Clm 6388, fol. 51r
- Church: Catholic Church
- Diocese: Diocese of Cremona

Personal details
- Born: 920 Pavia, Kingdom of Italy
- Died: 972 (aged 51–52) Cremona, Kingdom of Italy

Liutprand, also Liudprand, Liuprand, Lioutio, Liucius, Liuzo, and Lioutsios (c. 920 – 972), was an historian, diplomat, and the bishop of Cremona born in northern Italy, whose works are an important source for the politics of the 10th-century Byzantine court.

== Early life and career ==
Liutprand was born into a prominent family from Pavia, of Lombard origins, around 920. In 931 he entered service as page to Hugh of Arles, who kept court at Pavia as King of Italy and who married the notorious and powerful Marozia of Rome. Liutprand was educated at the court and became a Deacon at the Cathedral of Pavia. After Hugh died in 947, leaving his son and co-ruler Lothair II on the throne as King of Italy, Liutprand became confidential secretary and eventually chancellor to the de facto ruler of Italy, Berengar II, marchese d'Ivrea, who would ascend to the throne following Lothair II's death.

== Mission to Constantinople ==
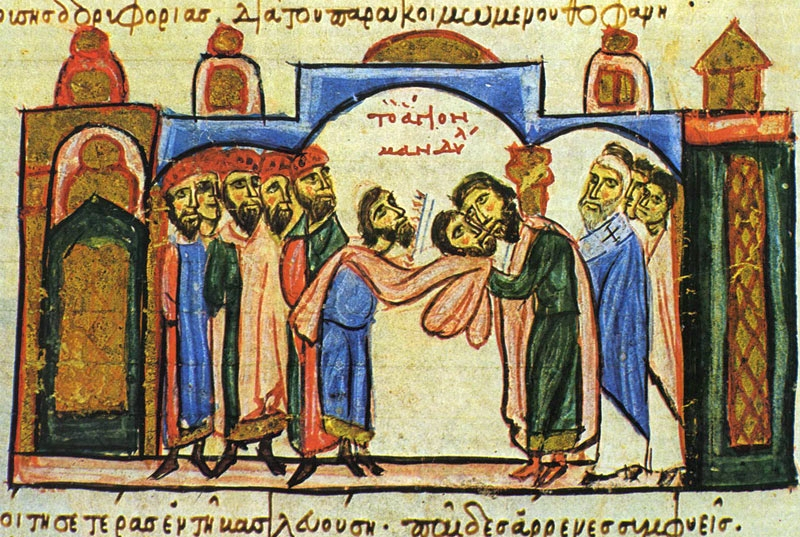
Surrender of the Mandylion to the Byzantines

In 949, Berengar II sent him on a goodwill mission as an apprentice diplomat to the Byzantine court of Constantine VII Porphyrogenitus, with whom he became friendly. Liutprand went partly to learn Greek and may have provided material for chapter 26 of Constantine VII's De Administrando Imperio. Liutprand knew a surprising amount of Greek and he was among the first Westerners to use Greek minuscule. Both Liutprand's father and his stepfather had been sent as ambassadors to Constantinople (927 and 942). (Knowledge of Prince Igor's 941 attack on Constantinople was told by his stepfather as Liutprand was not in the city at the time). Liutprand included in his later Antapodosis (950s) a glowing account of the hospitality he enjoyed there, including being carried into the audience hall on the shoulders of eunuchs, and Constantine's delight in receiving a gift of an additional four de luxe eunuchs from Liutprand. Liutprand uses the word "carzimasium" for the eunuchs he brought, suggesting that all of their external genitalia had been removed.

== Bishop of Cremona ==
On his return, however, he fell out with Berengar, for which Liutprand avenged himself in his Antapodosis ("retribution"), and attached himself to Berengar's rival, the future emperor Otto I, who had invaded Italy and been crowned King of the Lombards in 951. Otto I returned to Italy to depose Berengar in 961, and Liutprand was invested as Bishop of Cremona the following year. In Otto's court, he met Recemund, a Córdoban ambassador, who convinced him to write a history of his days (the later Antapodosis, which was dedicated to Recemund). Liutprand was often entrusted with important diplomacy, and, in 963, he was sent to Pope John XII at the beginning of the quarrel between the Pope and Otto I over papal allegiance to Berengar's son, Adelbert. Liutprand attended the Synod of Rome (963) that deposed John XII in 963, and wrote the only connected narrative of the events.

== Second mission to Constantinople ==
He was frequently employed in missions to the Pope, and in 968 he was sent again to Constantinople, this time to the court of Nicephorus Phocas, to demand for the younger Otto (afterwards Otto II) the hand of Anna Porphyrogenita, daughter of the former emperor Romanus II. The possible marriage was part of a wider negotiation between Otto and Nicephorus, the Eastern Emperor, who still claimed Benevento and Capua, which were actually in Lombard hands and whose forces had come to strife with Otto in Bari recently. His reception at Constantinople was humiliating and ultimately futile after the subject of Otto's claim to the title Emperor caused friction, triggered by a letter from Pope John XIII which offensively addressed Nicephorus as "the emperor of the Greeks".

Liutprand's account of this embassy in the Relatio de Legatione Constantinopolitana is perhaps the most graphic and lively piece of writing which has come down to us from the 10th century. The detailed description of Constantinople and the Byzantine court is a document of rare value, though highly coloured by his hostility towards the Byzantine Empire. The Catholic Encyclopedia asserted "Liutprand's writings are a very important historical source for the tenth century; he is ever a strong partisan and is frequently unfair towards his adversaries."

Liutprand's candid account makes clear that often he was not as diplomatic as he might have been and Constanze Schummer has questioned how good a diplomat he really was in Constantinople, despite successes in the West. On his second mission to Constantinople, for instance, after his purchases of purple textiles are confiscated, he tells the imperial party that at home whores and conjurers wear purple. Schummer and others have speculated that Otto I did not actually see the Relatio or receive an accurate account of Liutprand's performance at Constantinople.

Whether he returned in 971 with the embassy to fetch Theophanu, the eventually negotiated bride, or not is uncertain, but he may well have. Liutprand probably died before 20 July 972, certainly before 5 March 973. His successor as bishop of Cremona was installed in 973.

== Works ==
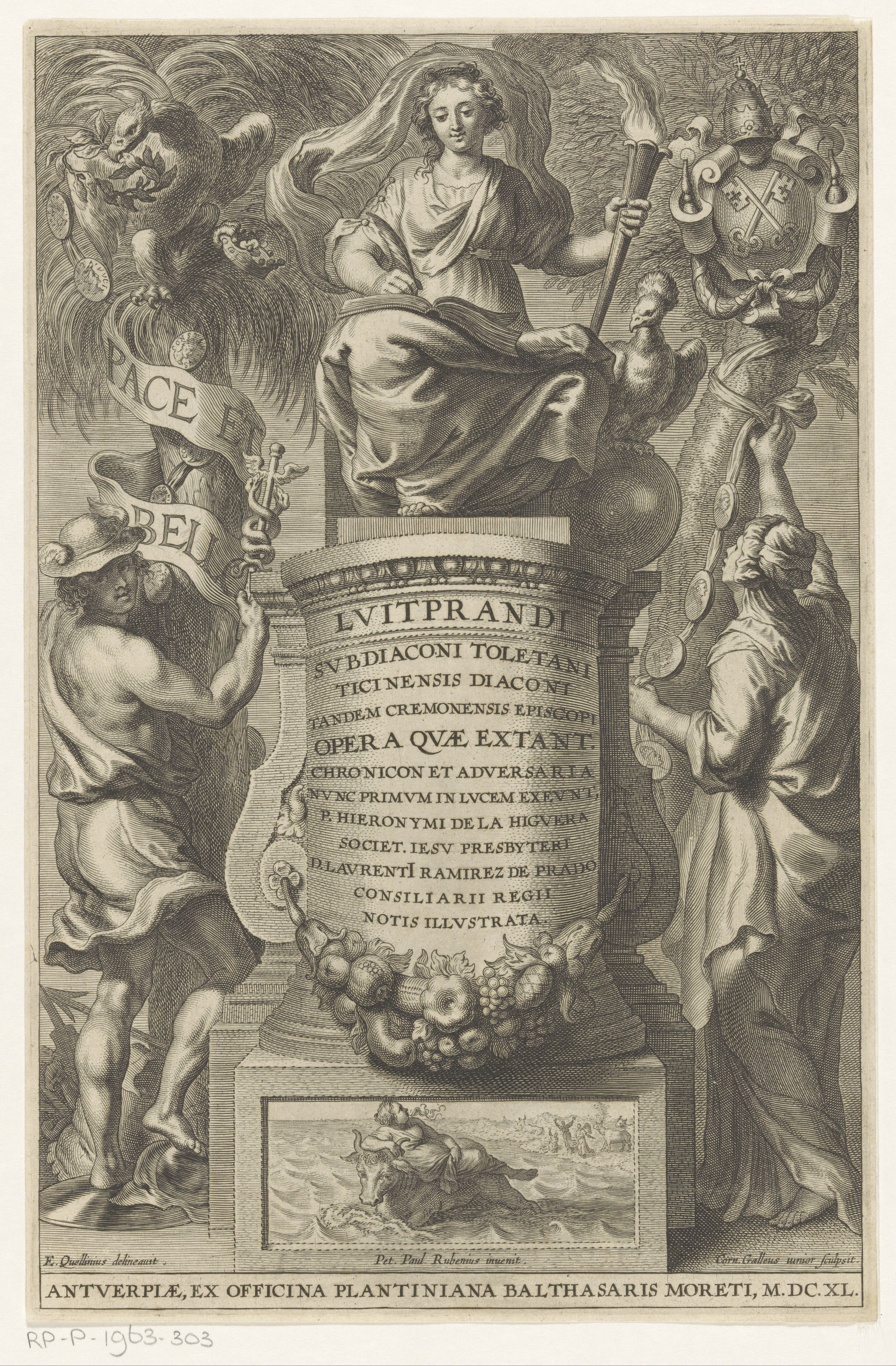
Liutprand of Cremona. Opera. Antwerp: Balthasar I Moretus, 1640.

- Antapodosis, seu rerum per Europam gestarum, Libri VI, a historical narrative, relating to events, largely in Italy, from 887 to 949. Compiled, according to Encyclopædia Britannica, "with the object of avenging himself upon Berengar and Willa his queen"
- Historia Ottonis, a praise of his patron Otto, covering only the years from 960 to 964, written as a partisan of the Emperor
- Relatio de legatione Constantinopolitana ad Nicephorum Phocam covering the years 968 and 969
- The standard critical edition of all of Liudprand's works is Chiesa, Paolo (1998). Liudprandi Cremonensis, Antapodosis, Homelia Paschalis, Historia Ottonis, Relatio de Legatio Constantinopolitana. Turnhout: Brepols. ISBN 978-2-503-04561-0.

== Works in English translation ==
- The Works of Liudprand of Cremona. Translated by F. A. Wright. London and New York: George Routledge and Sons. 1930.
- J. J. Norwich, ed. (1993). Liutprand of Cremona, The Embassy to Constantinople and Other Writings. London: Dent (reprint, with new introduction, of the 1930 Wright translation).
- B. Scott, ed. and trans., Liudprand of Cremona, Relatio de Legatione Constantinopolitana. Bristol Classical Press, 1993.
- Squatriti, Paolo, ed. (2007). The Complete Works of Liudprand of Cremona. Washington: The Catholic University of America Press.

== Bibliography ==
- McCormick, M. (1991). "Liutprand of Cremona". The Oxford Dictionary of Byzantium. Oxford: Oxford University Press.
