= Pope John XII =

Head of the Catholic Church from 955 to 964

- Bishop of Rome
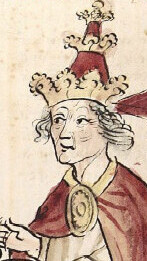
- Miniature of John XII from the Codex Palatinus Germanicus, (c. 1450, Heidelberg University Library)
- Church: Catholic Church
- Papacy began: 16 December 955
- Papacy ended: 14 May 964
- Predecessor: Agapetus II
- Successor: Benedict V

Orders
- Created cardinal: by Agapetus II

Personal details
- Born: Octavian of Tusculum (Italian: Ottaviano di Toscolo) c. 930/937 Rome, Papal States
- Died: 14 May 964 (aged c. 27–34) Rome, Papal States
- Parents: Alberic II of Spoleto; Alda of Vienne (?)

Pope John XII (Latin: Ioannes XII; c. 930/937 – 14 May 964), born Octavian, was the bishop of Rome and ruler of the Papal States from 16 December 955 to his death in 964. He was related to the counts of Tusculum, a powerful Roman family which had dominated papal politics for over half a century. He became pope somewhere between the ages of 17 and 25. If he was 17 then he may have been the youngest pope in history; if not, that title may belong to Benedict IX, who was between the ages of 11 and 20 when elected.

In 960, he clashed with the Lombards to the south. Unable to control Rome easily, he sought help from King Otto I of Germany and crowned him emperor. John XII's pontificate became infamous for the alleged depravity and worldliness with which he conducted his office. He soon fell out with Otto who, in 963, convened a synod in Rome which purported to depose John XII for his crimes and elect Leo VIII as his successor. John XII died several months after the synod declared him to be deposed.

He is almost universally regarded as one of the worst popes in history.

== Family and election ==
=== Family ===
Octavianus was the son of Alberic II of Spoleto, patrician and self-styled prince of Rome. His mother is believed to have been Alda of Vienne, Alberic's stepsister and the daughter of King Hugh of Italy. However, there is some doubt about this. Benedict of Soracte recorded that Octavianus was the son of a concubine (Genuit (Alberic) ex his principem ex concubinam filium, imposuit eis nomen Octabianus), but his Latin is unclear. If he was the son of Alda, he would have been 18 when he became pope, but if the son of a concubine he could have been up to 7 years older. He was born in the region of the Via Lata, the aristocratic quarter that was situated between the Quirinal Hill and the Campus Martius. His given name, evoking Augustus, was a clear indicator of how the family saw themselves and his destiny.

==== Family tree ====
Theophylact I, Count of Tusculum	Theodora
Hugh of Italy	Marozia
Alda of Vienne	Alberic II of Spoleto; 905–954	Pope John XI r. 931–935	David or Deodatus
Pope John XII r. 955–964	Gregory I, Count of Tusculum	Pope Benedict VII r. 974–983
Pope Benedict VIII r. 1012–1024	Alberic III, Count of Tusculum	Pope John XIX r. 1024–1032
Peter, Duke of the Romans	Pope Benedict IX r. 1032–1044, 1045, 1047–1048

=== Election ===
Sometime before his death in 954, Alberic administered an oath to the Roman nobles in St. Peter's providing that the next vacancy for the papal chair would be filled by his son Octavian, who by this stage had entered the Church. With his father's death, and without any opposition, he succeeded his father as prince of the Romans, somewhere between the ages of 17 and 24.

With the death of Pope Agapetus II in November 955, Octavian, who was the cardinal deacon of Santa Maria in Domnica, was elected his successor on 16 December 955. His adoption of the apostolic name of John XII was the third example of a pontiff taking a regnal name upon elevation to the papal chair, the first being John II (533–535) and the second John III (561–574). In relation to secular issues, the new pope issued his directives under the name of Octavian, while in all matters relating to the Church, he issued papal bulls and other ecclesiastical materials under his pontifical name of John.

== Papal reign ==
In around 960, John personally led an attack against the Lombard duchies of Beneventum and Capua, presumably to reclaim parts of the Papal States which had been lost to them. Confronted by the sight of John marching at the head of an army of men from Tusculum and Spoleto, the dukes of Beneventum and Capua appealed for help from Gisulf I of Salerno, who came to their aid. John retreated north and entered into negotiations with Gisulf at Terracina. A treaty was secured between the two parties, and the price for Gisulf's non-interference was John agreeing that the papacy would no longer claim Salerno as a Papal patrimony.

John soon found that he was unable to control the powerful Roman nobility as his father had so effortlessly done. At around the same time, King Berengar II of Italy began to attack the territory of the pope. In order to protect himself against political intrigues in Rome and the power of Berengar II, John sent papal legates in 960 to King Otto I of Germany, who had previously been granted the rank of patrician, asking for his aid. Agreeing to John's invitation, Otto entered Italy in 961. Berengar quickly retreated to his strongholds, and Otto proceeded to enter Rome on 31 January 962. There he met with John and proceeded to swear under oath that he would do everything to defend the pope:

To thee, the Lord Pope John, I, King Otto, promise and swear, by the Father, Son, and Holy Ghost, by the wood of the life-giving cross, and by these relics of the saints, that, if by the will of God I come to Rome, I will exalt to the best of my ability the Holy Roman Church and you its ruler; and never with my will or at my instigation shall you lose life or limb or the honour which you possess. And without your consent never, within the city of Rome, will I hold a placitum (plea) or make any regulation which affects you or the Romans. Whatever territory of St. Peter comes within my grasp, I will give up to you. And to whomsoever I shall entrust the kingdom of Italy, I will make him swear to help you as far as he can to defend the lands of St. Peter.

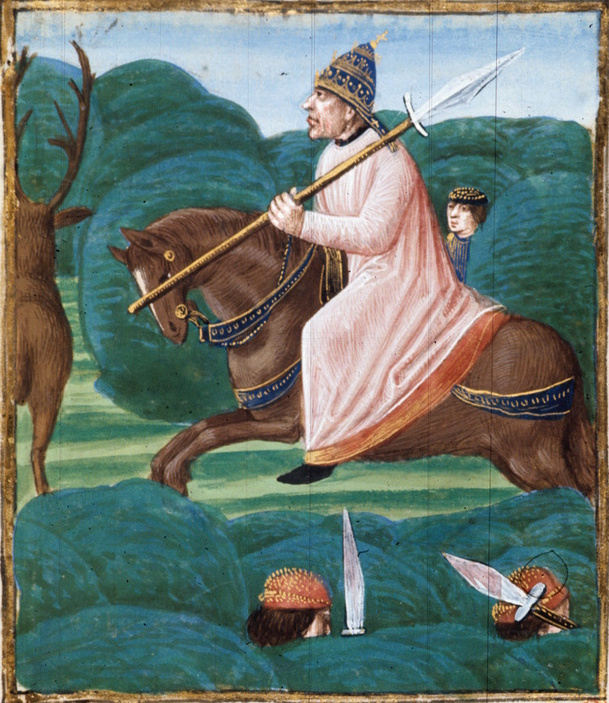
Miniature depicting John XII hunting, c. 1480

John then proceeded to crown Otto as emperor, the first in the west since the death of Berengar I of Italy almost 40 years before. The pope and the Roman nobility swore an oath over the buried remains of Saint Peter to be faithful to Otto, and not to provide aid to Berengar II or his son Adalbert. Eleven days later, the pope and emperor ratified the Diploma Ottonianum, under which the emperor became the guarantor of the independence of the Papal States, which ran from Naples and Capua in the south to La Spezia and Venice in the north. This was the first effective guarantee of such protection since the collapse of the Carolingian Empire nearly 100 years before. He also confirmed the freedom of papal elections, but retained the imperial right to agree to the election before the papal consecration, whilst at the same time retaining the clauses of the Constitutio Romana which restricted temporal papal power.

=== Church affairs ===
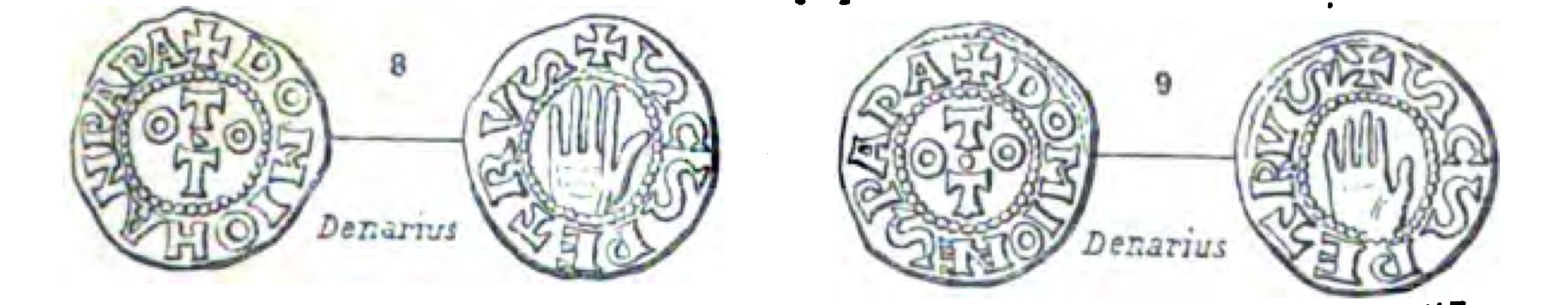
Coins of John XII

Although Pope John XII was condemned for his worldly ways, he still managed to devote some time towards church affairs. In early 956, he wrote to William of Mainz, the papal legate in Germany, urging him to continue in his work there, especially against those who would "devastate the churches of God". He asked William to inform him of the goings on both in West Francia and Germany. John also wrote to Henry, the new archbishop of Trier, granting him the pallium and encouraging him to lead a good life. In 958, he granted privileges to Subiaco Abbey, on condition that:

every day by priests and monks should be recited, for the good of our soul and the souls of our successors, a hundred Kyrie-eleisons and a hundred Christe-eleisons, and that thrice each week the priests should offer the Holy Mass to Almighty God for the absolution of our soul and those of our successors.

In 960 John confirmed the appointment of Saint Dunstan as archbishop of Canterbury, who traveled to Rome to receive the pallium directly from John XII's hands.

On 12 February 962, John convened a synod in Rome at the behest of Emperor Otto. In it, John agreed to establish the Archbishopric of Magdeburg and the Bishopric of Merseburg, bestowed the pallium on the archbishop of Salzburg and archbishop of Trier, and confirmed the appointment of Rather as bishop of Verona. It also passed a resolution excommunicating Bishop Hugh of Vermandois, who had attempted to reclaim his former position as archbishop of Reims. This excommunication was reconfirmed by John at another synod held at Pavia later that same year.

According to Horace Kinder Mann, "ecclesiastical affairs did not seem to have had much attraction for John XII".

=== Conflict with Otto and death ===
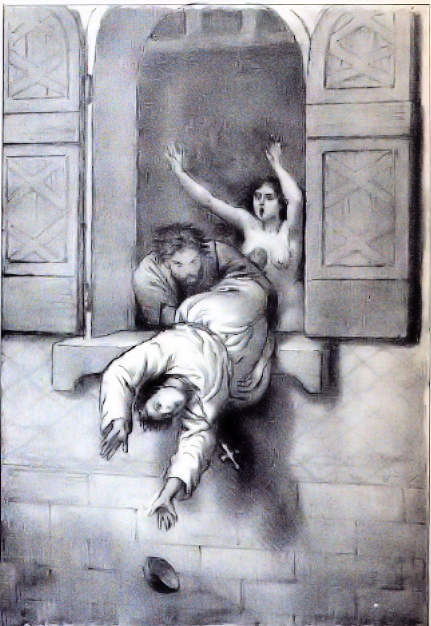
The death of Pope John XII: According to legend, an outraged nobleman defenestrated John after he bedded the man's wife.

Otto left Rome on 14 February 962 to bring Berengar II to heel. Before leaving he suggested that John, "who passed his whole life in vanity and adultery", give up his worldly and sensual lifestyle. John ignored this advice and watched with increasing anxiety as Otto quickly drove Berengar out of the Papal States. Growing ever more fearful of the emperor's power, he sent envoys to the Magyars and the Byzantine Empire to form a league against Otto. He also entered into negotiations with Berengar's son Adalbert.

John's ambassadors were captured by Otto I, who sent a deputation to Rome to discover what was happening behind his back. John in the meantime sent his own envoys to Otto, including the future Pope Leo VIII, who tried to reassure the emperor that John was seeking to reform the papal court. However, in 963, Otto next learned that Adalbert had been allowed to enter Rome for discussions with John. With Berengar effectively defeated and imprisoned, Otto returned to Rome, besieging it in the summer of 963. He found a city divided; supporters of the emperor who had reported Adalbert's arrival in Rome had dug themselves in at Joannispolis, a fortified section of Rome centred on the Basilica of Saint Paul Outside the Walls. John and his supporters meanwhile retained the old Leonine City. At first John prepared to defend the city; appearing in armour, he managed to drive Otto's forces across the Tiber River. However, he quickly decided that he could not continue to defend the city, and so taking the papal treasury with him, he and Adalbert fled to Tibur.

Otto I subsequently summoned a council which demanded that John present himself and defend himself against a number of charges. John responded by threatening to excommunicate anyone who attempted to depose him. Undeterred, the emperor and the council deposed John XII, who by this time had gone hunting in the mountains of Campania, and elected Pope Leo VIII in his stead.

An attempt at a revolt in support of John was mounted by the inhabitants of Rome even before Otto I left the city, but was put down with a large loss of life. However, upon the emperor's departure, John XII returned at the head of a large company of friends and retainers, causing Leo VIII to flee to the emperor for safety. Entering Rome in February 964, John proceeded to summon a synod which pronounced his deposition as uncanonical. After mutilating some of his enemies, he again was the effective ruler of Rome. Sending Otgar, Bishop of Speyer to the emperor, he attempted to come to some accommodation with Otto, but before anything could come of it, John XII died on 14 May 964. According to Liudprand of Cremona, John died whilst enjoying an adulterous sexual encounter outside Rome, either as the result of apoplexy, or at the hands of an outraged husband. In another version he would have a male lover, who murdered him out of jealousy.

John was buried in the Lateran. Pope Benedict V soon succeeded him, but he was successfully deposed by Leo VIII.

== Legacy ==
=== Character and reputation ===
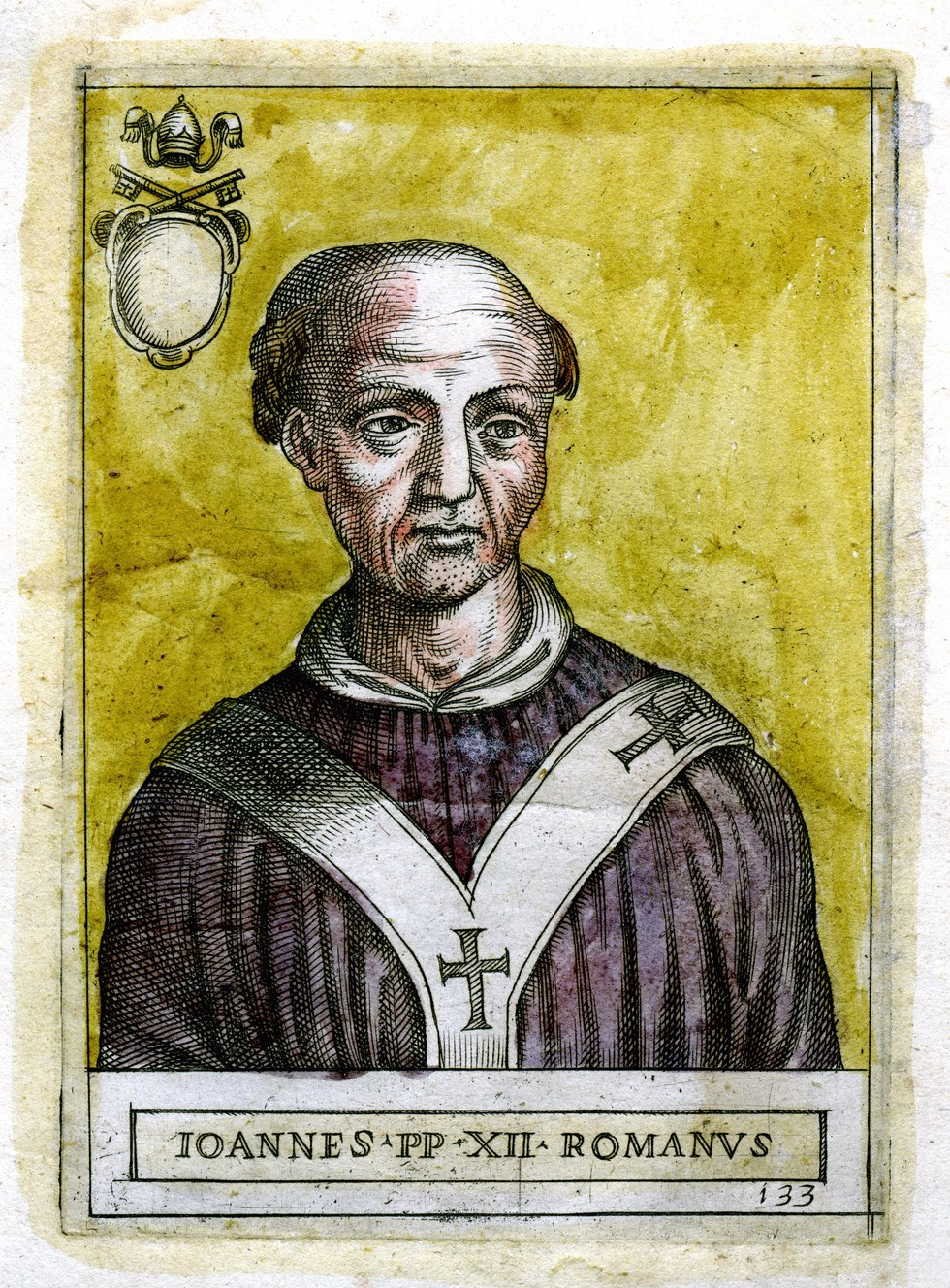
Pope John XII depicted in a 16th-century engraving contained in the Pontificum Romanorum effigies by Giovanni Battista de'Cavalieri

John's dual role as the secular prince of Rome and the spiritual head of the church saw his behaviour lean towards the former rather than the latter. He was depicted as a coarse, immoral man in the writings which remain about his papacy, whose life was such that the Lateran Palace was spoken of as a brothel, and the moral corruption in Rome became the subject of general disgrace. His lifestyle suited the secular prince he was, and his political enemies would use these accusations to blacken his reputation not only to justify, but to obscure the political dimensions of his deposition.

It is for this purpose that Liudprand of Cremona, a partisan of the Holy Roman Emperor Otto I, gives an account of the charges levelled against him at the Synod of Rome in 963:

Then, rising up, the cardinal priest Peter testified that he himself had seen John XII celebrate Mass without taking communion. John, bishop of Narni, and John, a cardinal deacon, professed that they themselves saw that a deacon had been ordained in a horse stable, but were unsure of the time. Benedict, cardinal deacon, with other co-deacons and priests, said they knew that he had been paid for ordaining bishops, specifically that he had ordained a ten-year-old bishop in the city of Todi ... They testified about his adultery, which they did not see with their own eyes, but nonetheless knew with certainty: he had fornicated with the widow of Rainier, with Stephana his father's concubine, with the widow Anna, and with his own niece, and he made the sacred palace into a whorehouse. They said that he had gone hunting publicly; that he had blinded his confessor Benedict, and thereafter Benedict had died; that he had killed John, cardinal subdeacon, after castrating him; and that he had set fires, girded on a sword, and put on a helmet and cuirass. All, clerics as well as laymen, declared that he had toasted to the devil with wine. They said when playing at dice, he invoked Jupiter, Venus and other demons. They even said he did not celebrate Matins at the canonical hours nor did he make the sign of the cross.

However, other contemporaries also accused John of immoral behaviour. For example, Ratherius of Verona wrote:

What improvement could be looked for if one who was leading an immoral life, who was bellicose and perjured, and who was devoted to hunting, hawking, gaming, and wine, were to be elected to the Apostolic See?

In the end, though, much of the subsequent extreme condemnation of John XII is derived from the accusations recorded by Liudprand of Cremona. So according to fiercely anti-Catholic Louis Marie DeCormenin:

John XII was worthy of being the rival of Elagabalus ... a robber, a murderer, and incestuous person, unworthy to represent Christ upon the pontifical throne ... This abominable priest soiled the chair of St. Peter for nine entire years and deserved to be called the most wicked of popes.

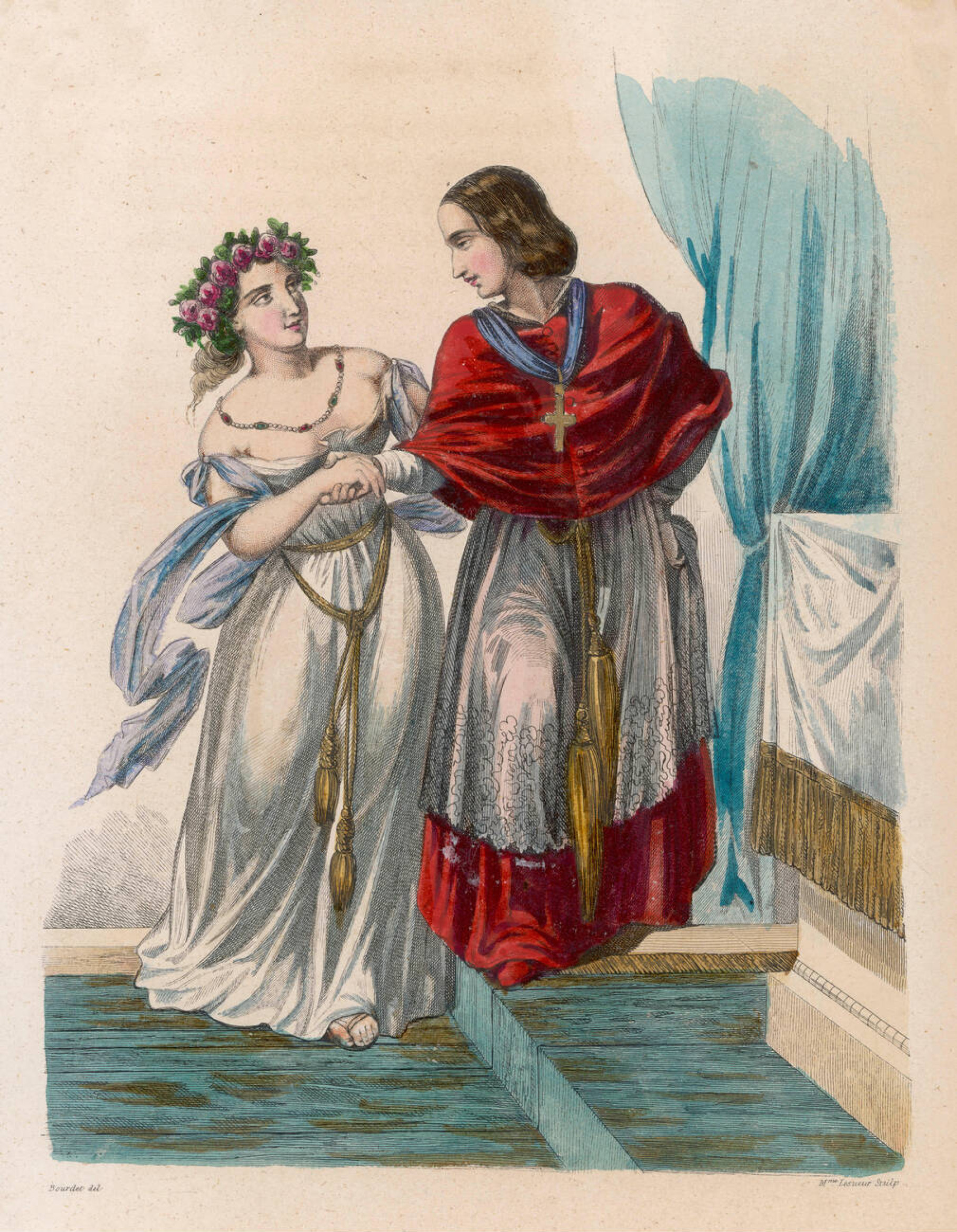
Satirical print by Maurice Lachâtre portraying Pope John XII with a mistress, referencing medieval accusations about his conduct.

The historian Ferdinand Gregorovius was somewhat more sympathetic:

John's princely instincts were stronger than his taste for spiritual duties, and the two natures—that of Octavian and that of John the Twelfth—stood in unequal conflict. Called as he was in the immaturity of youth to a position which gave him claims on the reverence of the world, his judgment deserted him, and he plunged into the most unbridled sensuality. The Lateran palace was turned into an abode of riot and debauchery. The gilded youths of the city were his daily companions ... The son of the glorious Alberic thus fell a sacrifice to his own unbridled passion, and to the anomalous position which he held as Prince and Pope at the same time. His youth, the greatness of his father, the tragic discords of his position, claim for him a lenient judgment.

Even Horace Mann, a papal defender, was forced to acknowledge:

There cannot be a doubt that John XII was anything but what a Pope, the chief pastor of Christendom, should have been.

=== Link to Pope Joan legend ===
Onofrio Panvinio, in the revised edition of Bartolomeo Platina's book about the popes, added an elaborate note indicating that the legend of Pope Joan may be based on a mistress of John XII: "Panvinius, in a note to Platina's account of pope Joan, suggests that the licentiousness of John XII, who, among his numerous mistresses, had one called Joan, who exercised the chief influence at Rome during his pontificate, may have given rise to the story of 'pope Joan'."

== See also ==
- List of sexually active popes
- The Bad Popes

== Bibliography ==
- Chamberlin, Russell (2003). The Bad Popes. Sutton Publishing. pp. 955–963.
- DeCormenin, Louis Marie; Gihon, James L (1857). A Complete History of the Popes of Rome, from Saint Peter, the First Bishop to Pius the Ninth.
- Gregorovius, Ferdinand (1895). The History of Rome in the Middle Ages, Vol. III. G. Bell & sons.
- Luttwak, Edward (2009). The Grand Strategy of the Byzantine Empire. Harvard University Press.
- Mann, Horace K. (1910). The Lives of the Popes in the Early Middle Ages, Vol. IV: The Popes in the Days of Feudal Anarchy, 891-999.
- Norwich, John Julius (2011). The Popes: A History.

Catholic Church titles
Preceded by Agapetus II	Pope; 955–964	Succeeded by Leo VIII
