= Solly Madonna =

1500s painting by Raphael

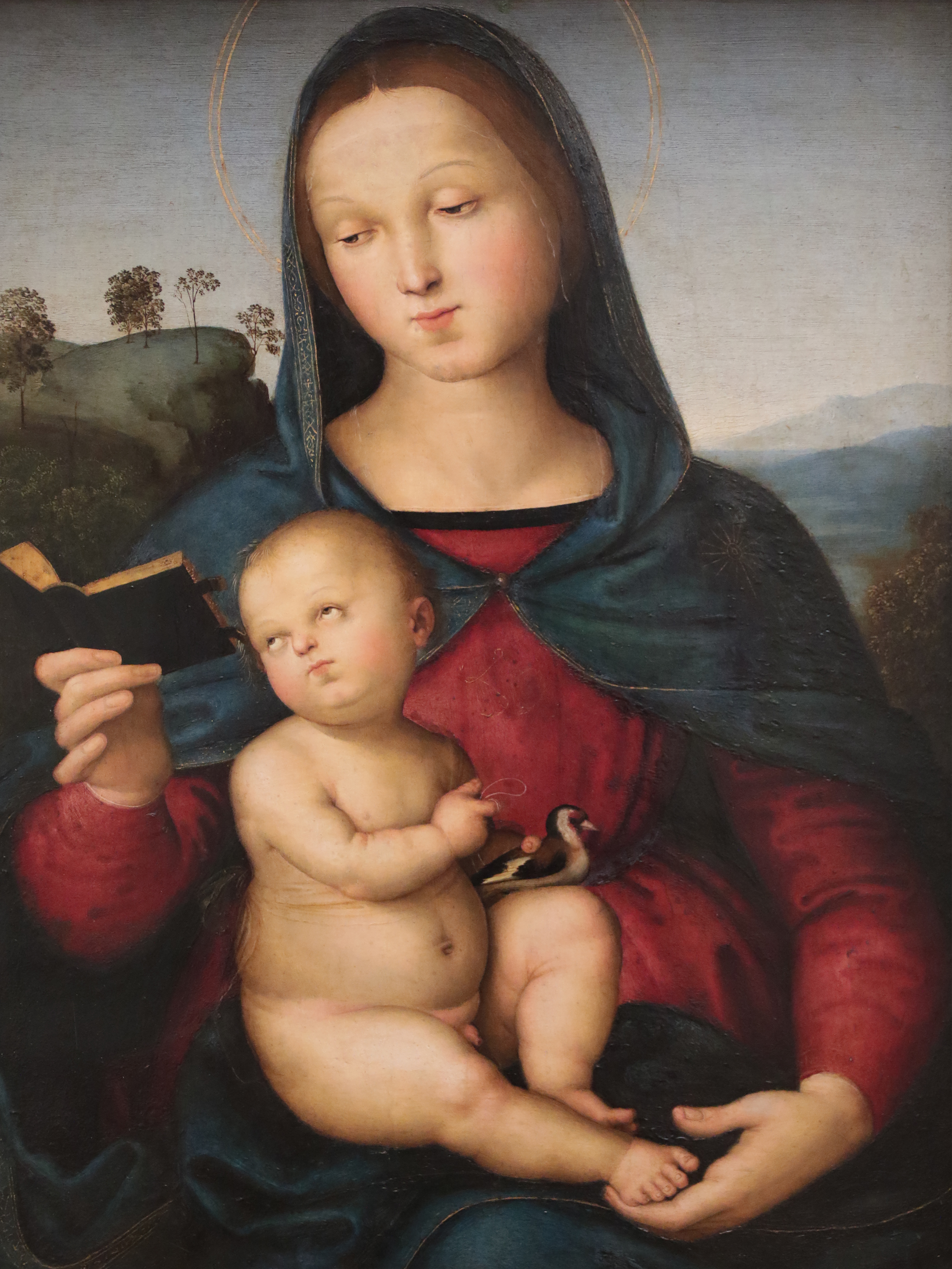
- Artist: Raphael
- Year: c. 1500–1504
- Medium: Oil on wood
- Dimensions: 52 cm × 38 cm (20 in × 15 in)
- Location: Gemäldegalerie, Berlin

The Solly Madonna by the Italian Renaissance artist Raphael was painted sometime between 1500 and 1504.

An early work, it clearly shows the influence of Raphael's teacher Perugino. Two motifs in this work would recur in later Madonnas by Raphael. The virgin Mary is reading a book, as in the Madonna and Child in the Norton Simon Museum, the Conestabile Madonna, the Madonna Colonna and the Madonna del Cardellino. As in that last painting a small bird, a European goldfinch, is part of the scene.

The painting is located in the Gemäldegalerie, Berlin. It is called the Solly Madonna because it was owned by the British banker and art collector Edward Solly (1776–1848).

== See also ==
- List of paintings by Raphael
