= Portrait of Cardinal Alessandro Farnese =

Portrait of Cardinal Alessandro Farnese may refer to:

- Portrait of Cardinal Alessandro Farnese (Raphael)
- Portrait of Cardinal Alessandro Farnese (Titian)
