= List of paintings by Raphael =

The following is a list of paintings by the Italian Renaissance painter Raphael. Together with Michelangelo and Leonardo da Vinci he forms the traditional trinity of great masters of that period. He was enormously prolific. Despite his early death at 37, a large body of work remains, especially in the Vatican, where Raphael and a large team of assistants, executing his drawings under Raphael's direction, frescoed the Raphael Rooms known as the Stanze. He was extremely influential in his lifetime, but after his death the influence of his rival Michelangelo was more widespread until the 18th and 19th centuries, when his more tranquil qualities were again widely taken as models.

== List of paintings ==
Image	Year, Title	Gallery, Location	Technique, Dimensions (cm)
	1499–1502: Resurrection of Christ	São Paulo Museum of Art, Brazil	Oil on panel 57 x 47
	c. 1499: Banner of the Holy Trinity	Pinacoteca Comunale, Città di Castello	Oil on canvas 166 x 94
	c. 1499: The Creation of Eve from Adam's Rib	Pinacoteca Comunale, Città di Castello	Oil on canvas 166 x 94
	1500-1501: Baronci Altarpiece	Pinacoteca Comunale, Città di Castello	Oil on panel
	1500–1501: Angel	Pinacoteca Civica Tosio Martinengo, Brescia, Italy	Oil on canvas transferred from panel 31 x 26
	1500–1501: Angel Holding a Scroll	Louvre, Paris, France	Oil on panel 58 x 36
	1500–1501: God the Father and the Virgin Mary	Museo di Capodimonte, Naples, Italy	Tempera on panel 110 x 73
	1501–1502: Saint Sebastian	Accademia Carrara di Belle Arti di Bergamo, Italy	Oil on panel 45,1 x 36,5
	c. 1502: Portrait of a Man	Galleria Borghese, Rome, Italy	Oil on panel 45 x 31
	c. 1502: Madonna and Child between Saints Jerome and Francis	Gemäldegalerie, Berlin, Germany	Oil on panel 34 x 29
	c. 1502: Solly Madonna	Gemäldegalerie, Berlin, Germany	Oil on panel 52 x 38
	1502–1503: Madonna and Child with the Book	Norton Simon Museum, Pasadena, United States	Oil on panel 55,2 x 40
	1502–1503: Mond Crucifixion	National Gallery, London, United Kingdom	Oil on panel 283,3 x 167,3
	1502–1503: Saint Eusebius Resurrecting Three People	National Museum of Ancient Art, Lisbon, Portugal	Oil on panel 25,6 x 43,9
	1503: Saint Jerome Punishing the Heretic Sabinian	North Carolina Museum of Art, Raleigh, United States	Oil on panel 25,7 x 41,9
	1502–1504: Coronation of the Virgin	Vatican Museums, Vatican City	Tempera on panel transferred to canvas 272 x 165
	1502–1504: The Annunciation	Vatican Museums, Vatican City	Tempera on panel 27 x 50
	1502–1504: The Adoration of the Magi	Vatican Museums, Vatican City	Tempera on panel 27 x 50
	1502–1504: The Presentation in the Temple	Vatican Museums, Vatican City	Tempera on panel 27 x 50
	c. 1503: Diotallevi Madonna	Gemäldegalerie, Berlin, Germany	Oil on panel 69 x 50
	c. 1503: Self-Portrait	Alte Pinakothek, Munich, Germany	(Note: Identified by Carlo Volpe in 1956. Cleanings of the portrait have removed the modeling, giving the portrait an overly youthful appearance.)
	1503–1504: Young Man with an Apple	Uffizi, Florence, Italy	Tempera on panel 48 x 35,5
	1503–1505: Saint George	Louvre, Paris, France	Oil on panel 29 x 25
	1503–1505: Saint Michael	Louvre, Paris, France	Oil on panel 30 x 26
	1503–1505: Portrait of Pietro Bembo	Museum of Fine Arts (Budapest), Hungary	Oil on panel 54 x 39
	1504 Portrait of Perugino	Uffizi, Florence	Tempera on wood 57 × 42
	1504: The Marriage of the Virgin	Pinacoteca di Brera, Milan, Italy	Oil on panel 170 x 117
	1504: Conestabile Madonna	Hermitage Museum, Saint Petersburg, Russia	Tempera on canvas transferred from panel 17,5 x 18
	c. 1504; Madonna and Child Enthroned with Saints	Metropolitan Museum of Art, New York, United States	Oil and gold on panel 169,5 x 168,9
	c. 1504; The Agony in the Garden	Metropolitan Museum of Art, New York, United States	Oil on panel 24,1 x 28,9
	1504–1505; The Procession to Calvary	National Gallery, London, United Kingdom	Oil on panel 24,4 x 85,5
	Lamentation over the Dead Christ	Isabella Stewart Gardner Museum, Boston, United States	Oil on panel 23,5 x 28,8
	c. 1504: Saint Francis of Assisi	Dulwich Picture Gallery, London, United Kingdom	Oil on panel 25 x 16
	c. 1504: Saint Anthony of Padua	Dulwich Picture Gallery, United Kingdom	Oil on panel 25 x 16
	c. 1504; An Allegory ('Vision of a Knight')	National Gallery, London, United Kingdom	Oil on panel 17,1 x 17,3
	c. 1504; Three Graces	Musée Condé, Chantilly, France	Oil on panel 17 x 17
	1504–1505 Portrait of Elisabetta Gonzaga	Uffizi, Florence	Oil on wood 52.9 × 37.4
	1504–1505 Portrait of Emilia Pia da Montefeltro	Baltimore Museum of Art, Baltimore	Oil on wood 58 × 36
	1504–1505; Madonna del Granduca	Palazzo Pitti, Florence, Italy	Oil on panel 84,4 x 55,9
	1505: Ansidei Madonna	National Gallery, London, United Kingdom	Oil on panel 216,8 x 147,6
	1505: Saint John the Baptist Preaching	National Gallery, London, United Kingdom	Oil on panel 26,2 x 52
	c. 1505; Small Cowper Madonna	National Gallery of Art, Washington, United States	Oil on panel 59,5 x 44
	c. 1505: Terranuova Madonna	Gemäldegalerie, Berlin, Germany	Oil on panel Diameter 88,5
	1505–1506: Christ Blessing	Pinacoteca Civica Tosio Martinengo, Brescia, Italy	Oil on panel 32 x 25
	1505–1506: Madonna of the Goldfinch	Uffizi, Florence, Italy	Tempera on panel 107 x 77
	1505–1506: Madonna of the Meadow	Kunsthistorisches Museum, Vienna, Austria	Oil on panel 113 x 88,5
	1505–1506: La Donna Gravida	Palazzo Pitti, Florence, Italy	Oil on panel 68,8 x 52,6
	1505–1507: Madonna with Beardless Saint Joseph	Hermitage Museum, Saint Petersburg, Russia	Tempera on canvas, transferred from panel 72,5 x 56,5
	1506 Portrait of Guidobaldo da Montefeltro	Uffizi, Florence	Oil on wood 69 × 52
	1506: Portrait of Agnolo Doni	Uffizi, Florence, Italy	Oil on panel 63 x 45
	1506: Portrait of Maddalena Doni	Uffizi, Florence, Italy	Oil on panel 63 x 45
	1506: Lady with a Unicorn	Galleria Borghese, Rome, Italy	Oil on panel 65 x 51
	1506: The Holy Family With a Palm Tree	Scottish National Gallery, Edinburgh, United Kingdom	Oil and gold on canvas transferred from panel diameter 101,5
	c. 1506: Self-portrait	Palazzo Pitti, Florence, Italy	Tempera on panel 47,5 x 33
	c. 1506: Saint George and the Dragon	National Gallery of Art, Washington, United States	Oil on panel 28,5 x 21,5
	1506–1507: The Madonna of the Pinks ('La Madonna dei Garofani')	National Gallery, London, United Kingdom	Oil on panel 27,9 x 22,4
	1507: Canigiani Holy Family	Alte Pinakothek, Munich, Germany	Oil on panel 131 x 107
	1507: The Holy Family with a Lamb	Museo del Prado, Madrid, Spain	Oil on panel 28 x 21,5
	1507: La Madonna de Bogota (Madonna with the Child)	NY Bank Vault, New York, United States	?
	1507: The Deposition	Galleria Borghese, Rome, Italy	Oil on panel 184 x 176
	1507: Faith, Hope and Charity	Vatican Museums, Vatican City	Tempera on panel 18 x 44 each
	c. 1507: Orléans Madonna	Musée Condé, Chantilly, France	Oil on panel 29 x 21
	c. 1507: Saint Catherine of Alexandria	National Gallery, London, United Kingdom	Oil on panel 72,2 x 55,7
	c. 1507: Bridgewater Madonna	Scottish National Gallery, Edinburgh, United Kingdom	Oil and gold on canvas, transferred from panel 81 x 55
	c. 1507: Portrait of a Young Woman (La Muta)	Galleria Nazionale delle Marche, Urbino, Italy	Oil on panel 64 x 48
	1507–1508: The Virgin and Child with the Infant Saint John the Baptist (La belle jardinière)	Louvre, Paris, France	Oil on panel 122 x 80
	1507–1508: Madonna of the Baldacchino	Palazzo Pitti, Florence, Italy	Oil on canvas 279 x 217
	1507–1508: Colonna Madonna	Gemäldegalerie, Berlin, Germany	Oil on panel 52 x 38
	1508: Tempi Madonna	Alte Pinakothek, Munich, Germany	Oil on panel 75 x 51
	1508: Niccolini-Cowper Madonna	National Gallery of Art, Washington, United States	Oil on panel 80,7 x 57,5
	1508: Esterhazy Madonna	Museum of Fine Arts, Budapest, Hungary	Tempera and oil on panel 28,5 × 21,5
	c. 1509: Portrait of Tommaso Inghirami	Palazzo Pitti, Florence, Italy	Oil on panel 89,5 x 62,8
	c. 1509: Portrait of Tommaso Inghirami	Isabella Stewart Gardner Museum, Boston, United States	Oil on panel 89,7 x 62,2
	1509–1510: Garvagh Madonna	National Gallery, London, United Kingdom	Oil on panel 38,9 x 32,9
	1509–1510: La Disputa	Vatican Museums, Vatican City	Fresco; 500 x 770
	1509–1510: The School of Athens	Vatican Museums, Vatican City	Fresco; 500 x 770
	1509–1510: Madonna of Loreto	Musée Condé, Chantilly, France	Oil on panel 120 x 90
	1509–1511: Mackintosh Madonna	National Gallery, London, United Kingdom	Oil (almost entirely repainted) on canvas, transferred from panel 78,8 x 64,2
	1509–1511: Portrait of Cardinal Alessandro Farnese	Museo di Capodimonte, Naples, Italy	Oil on panel 139 x 91
	c. 1510: Alba Madonna	National Gallery of Art, Washington, United States	Oil on panel transferred to canvas diameter 94,5
	1510–1511: The Cardinal	Museo del Prado, Madrid, Spain	Oil on panel 79 x 61
	1511: The Parnassus	Vatican Museums, Vatican City	Fresco ? x 670
	1511: The Cardinal Virtues	Vatican Museums, Vatican City	Fresco ? x 660
	1511: Portrait of Pope Julius II	National Gallery, London, United Kingdom	Oil on panel 108,7 x 81
	1511–1512: The Prophet Isaiah	Basilica of Sant'Agostino, Rome, Italy	Fresco; 250 x 155
	1511–1512: The Expulsion of Heliodorus from the Temple	Vatican Museums, Vatican City	Fresco ? x 750
	1511–1512: Madonna of Foligno	Vatican Museums, Vatican City	Tempera on panel transferred onto canvas 308 x 198
	1511–1513: The Triumph of Galatea	Villa Farnesina, Rome, Italy	Fresco; 750 x 570
	c.1512 Cupid and Psyche (The Council of the Gods)	Villa Farnesina, Rome, Italy	Fresco
	c. 1512: Portrait of Pope Julius II	Uffizi, Florence, Italy	Oil on panel 108,5 x 80
	1512–1513: Sistine Madonna	Gemäldegalerie Alte Meister, Dresden, Germany	Oil on canvas 265 х 196
	1513: Madonna of Leo X	Private collection, Zurich, Switzerland	Oil on canvas 119 x 82,5
	c. 1513: Madonna of the Candelabra	Walters Art Museum, Baltimore, United States	Oil on panel 65,7 х 64
	1513–1514: Madonna with the Fish	Museo del Prado, Madrid, Spain	Oil on panel 215 x 158
	1513–1514: Madonna della seggiola (Madonna and Child with the Infant Saint John the Baptist)	Palazzo Pitti, Florence, Italy	Oil on panel diameter 71
	1513–1514: Madonna dell'Impannata	Palazzo Pitti, Florence, Italy	Oil on panel 160 x 127
	1513–1514 Portrait of a Young Man	Czartoryski Museum, Kraków, Poland	oil on panel 72 × 56
	1514: Madonna della tenda	Alte Pinakothek, Munich, Germany	Oil on panel 65,8 x 51,2
	1514: The Sibyls	Santa Maria della Pace, Rome, Italy	Fresco x 615
	1514–1515: Portrait of Baldassare Castiglione	Louvre, Paris, France	Oil on canvas 82 x 67
	1514–1515: Ecstasy of Saint Cecilia Between Saints Paul, John Evangelist, Augustine and Mary Magdalene	Pinacoteca Nazionale di Bologna, Italy	Oil on panel transferred to canvas 236 x 139
	c. 1515: Portrait of Bindo Altoviti	National Gallery of Art, Washington, United States	Oil on panel 59,7 x 43,8
	1515–1516: Christ Falls on the Way to Calvary	Museo del Prado, Madrid, Spain	Oil on panel 318 x 229
	1515–1516: Woman with a Veil (La donna velata)	Palazzo Pitti, Florence, Italy	Oil on canvas 82 x 60,5
	c. 1516: Portrait of Cardinal Bibbiena	Palazzo Pitti, Florence, Italy	Oil on canvas 85 x 66,3
	c. 1516: Portrait of Andrea Navagero and Agostino Beazzano	Doria Pamphilj Gallery, Rome, Italy	Oil on canvas 77 x 111
	c. 1516: Madonna del Passeggio	Scottish National Gallery, Edinburgh, United Kingdom	Oil and gold on panel 90 x 63,3
	1516 Creation of the World	Chigi Chapel, Rome	
	1516-1517 Saint John the Baptist in the Desert	Louvre, Paris	Oil on canvas transferred from panel 135 × 142
	c. 1517: Visitation	Museo del Prado, Madrid, Spain	Oil on panel 200 x 145
	1510-1518 Madonna with the Blue Diadem	Louvre, Paris	Oil on wood 68 × 48
	1518-1520: Madonna of the Rose	Museo del Prado, Madrid, Spain	Oil on canvas 103 x 84
	1518: Holy Family of Francis I	Louvre, Paris, France	Oil on canvas transferred from panel 207 x 140
	1518: The Vision of Ezekiel	Palazzo Pitti, Florence, Italy	Oil on panel 40,7 x 29,5
	1518: Saint Michael Vanquishing Satan	Louvre, Paris, France	Oil on canvas transferred from panel 268 x 160
	c. 1518: Saint Margaret and the Dragon	Kunsthistorisches Museum, Vienna, Austria'	Oil on panel 192 x 122
	1518 Saint Margaret and the Dragon	Louvre, Paris	Oil on panel 178 x 122
	c. 1518: Portrait of a Young Woman	Musée des Beaux-Arts de Strasbourg, France	Oil on panel 60 x 40
	c. 1518: Portrait of Lorenzo de' Medici, Duke of Urbino	Private collection	Oil on canvas 97.2 × 79.4
	c. 1518: Pope Leo X with Cardinals Giulio de' Medici and Luigi de' Rossi	Uffizi, Florence, Italy	Tempera on panel 155,5 x 119,5
	c. 1518: The Pearl	Museo del Prado, Madrid, Spain	Oil on panel 147,4 x 116
	1518 Portrait of Doña Isabel de Requesens y Enríquez de Cardona-Anglesola	Louvre, Lens	Oil on panel 120 × 95
	1518–1519: Self-portrait with a Friend	Louvre, Paris, France	Oil on canvas 99 x 83
	1518–1519 Small Holy Family	Louvre, Paris	Oil on panel 38 × 32
	1518–1520: Holy Family Under an Oak Tree	Museo del Prado, Madrid, Spain	Oil on panel 144 x 110
	1520: La fornarina	Palazzo Barberini, Rome, Italy	Oil on panel 87 x 63
	1516–1520: The Transfiguration	Vatican Museums, Vatican City	Tempera on panel 410 x 279

== See also ==
- Portrait of a Young Man (Raphael)
- Saint John the Baptist in the Desert (Raphael)
