= Saint John the Baptist in the Wilderness =

Saint John the Baptist in the Wilderness may refer to:

- St. John the Baptist in the Wilderness, a painting by Hieronymus Bosch
- Any of several paintings by Caravaggio, for which see John the Baptist (Caravaggio)
- John the Baptist in the Wilderness, a painting by Geertgen tot Sint Jans
- Saint John the Baptist in the Desert (Raphael), a painting attributed to the workshop of Raphael

== See also ==
- Saint John the Baptist (disambiguation)
