= Conestabile Madonna =

Painting by Raphael

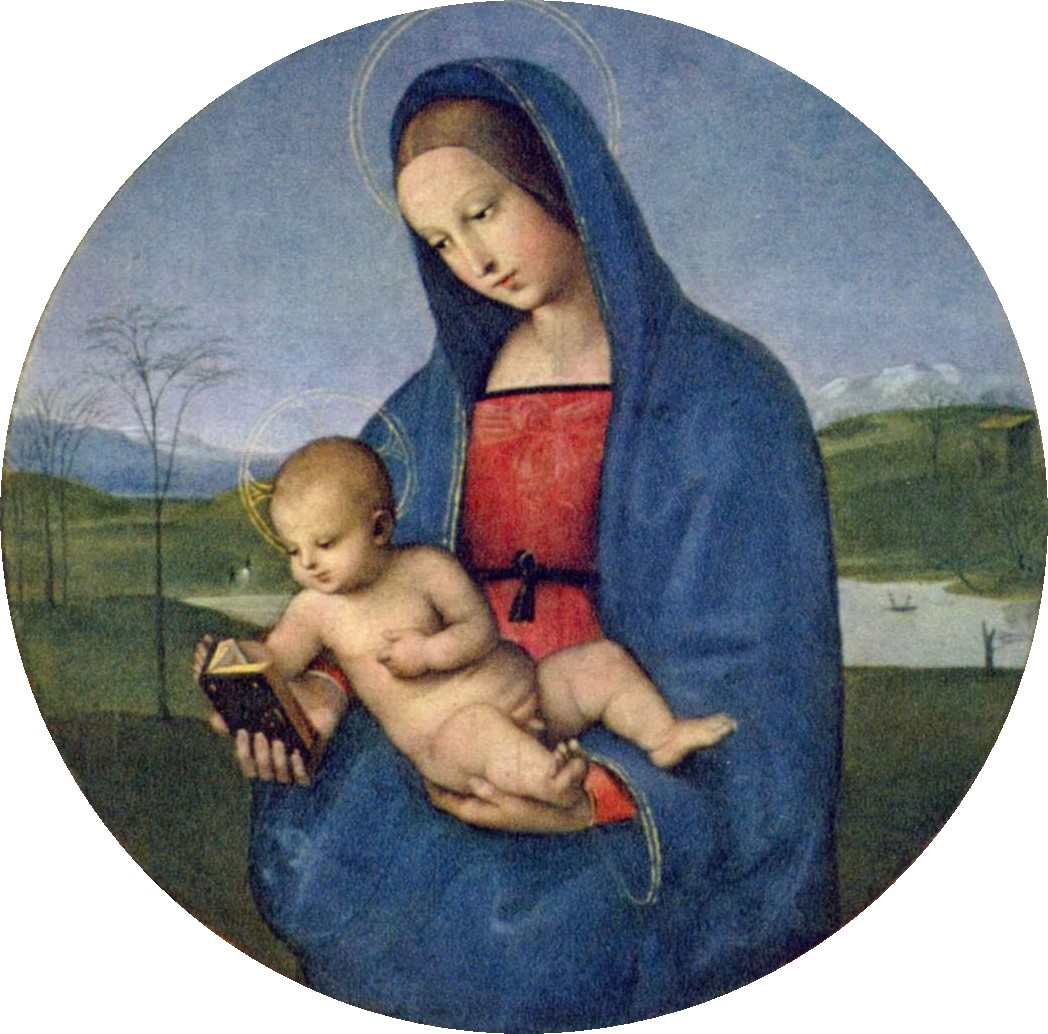
- Artist: Raphael
- Year: c. 1502–1504
- Type: Tempera on canvas transferred from wood
- Dimensions: 17.5 cm × 18 cm (6.9 in × 7.1 in)
- Location: Hermitage Museum, Saint Petersburg

The Conestabile Madonna is a small painting by the Italian Renaissance artist Raphael, executed c. 1504.

The Conestabile Madonna is a tondo painting in a decorative and intricate square frame. It depicts Mary and Christ reading a book in front of an outdoor landscape. The painting has changed over time as Raphael originally painted it on wood, but it was later moved to canvas in 1871, and Raphael had originally sketched Mary holding an apple instead of a book.

The Conestabile Madonna has connections to other paintings, including Raphael’s later painting, the Bridgewater Madonna, and its design inspired Berto di Giovanni’s painting, The Virgin and Child with a Pomegranate. The painting has traveled since its creation between different owners, and now resides in the Hermitage Museum in Saint Petersburg.

== Context ==
There are conflicting reports on the patron for the Conestabile Madonna. Some scholars believe that Alfano Di Diamante could have commissioned the painting. Other sources cite no record of a patron for the piece. The exact date of the painting is unknown and was initially thought to be from sometime between 1500 and 1502. However, recent estimates suggest that Raphael painted the Conestabile Madonna in 1504.

== Physical description ==
The Conestabile Madonna depicts two figures, Mary and Christ. Mary is holding Christ and a book, and both Mary and Christ are reading the book in her hand, with the Christ gazing at the book intently. Hugo Chapman suggests that this book is the Bible or a breviary. The background landscape is gentle and serene. It features rolling hills and snowy mountains, which create a heightened sense of depth. At mid-level, there is a body of water, either a river or lake. A few bare trees and four small figures are also in the background. The muted and natural tones contrast the blue and red in the Madonna’s clothing. This landscape reflects the influence of Perugia, seen in many of Raphael’s paintings.

The Conestabile Madonna is a tondo painting. However, Raphael had initially constructed the painting as a square. While painting, he changed the painting to a circular format by painting spandrels. A unique element of the tondo painting is that Raphael does not show the entire length of Mary’s robes or the extent of the landscape behind Mary and Christ. Additionally, the painting is also unusually small in size, measuring 17.5 cm x 18 cm.

=== Frame ===
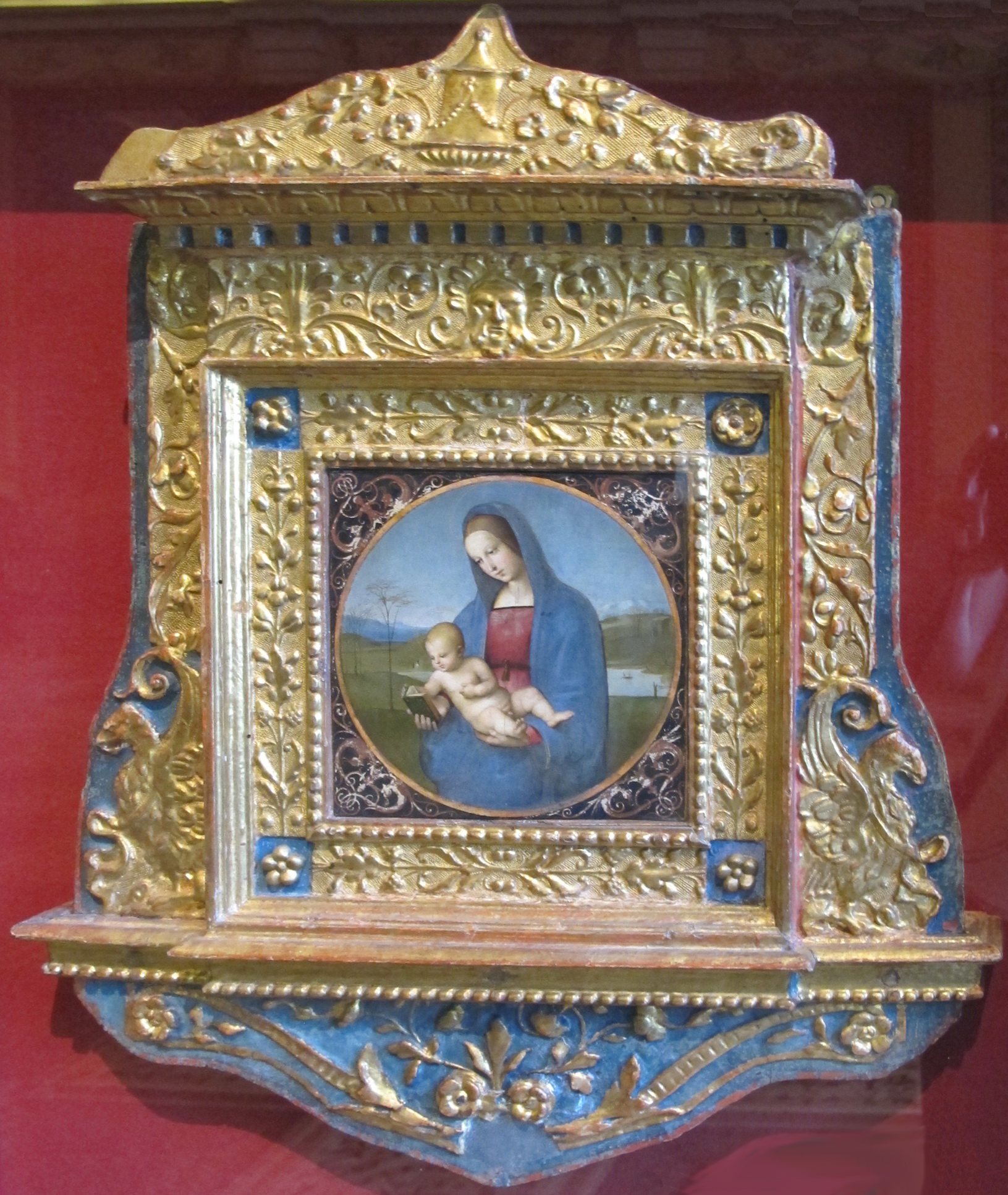
View of the painting within its frame.

The Conestabile Madonna tondo is in a square decorative area. The spandrels, the decorated frame, and the painting combine to form a larger ensemble. The art historian Jürg Meyer zur Capellen believes the frame is potentially custom-made and has been restored multiple times. The frame constitutes several pieces, and the lower frieze of the painting has a putty-filled hole. Meyer zur Capellen believes the hole was potentially the location of a candle holder.

The frame was traditionally regarded as an original part of Raphael's design. However, the design of the frame suggests that the frame was composed independently of the painting. The frame comprises many seemingly unrelated decorative pieces and follows no noticeable artistic scheme. The pieces' proportions do not fit, and the frame's maker did not design the pastiglia for their specific positions on the frame. Raphael's early sketches demonstrate a sense of architectural relationship, suggesting his involvement in the frame is unlikely.

== Alterations ==
The Conestabile Madonna was originally executed on wood but was moved to canvas. Raphael also appears to have altered the composition. An underdrawing discovered when the work was transferred to canvas revealed that the Virgin Mary was originally holding an apple or pomegranate instead of a book.

== Related works ==
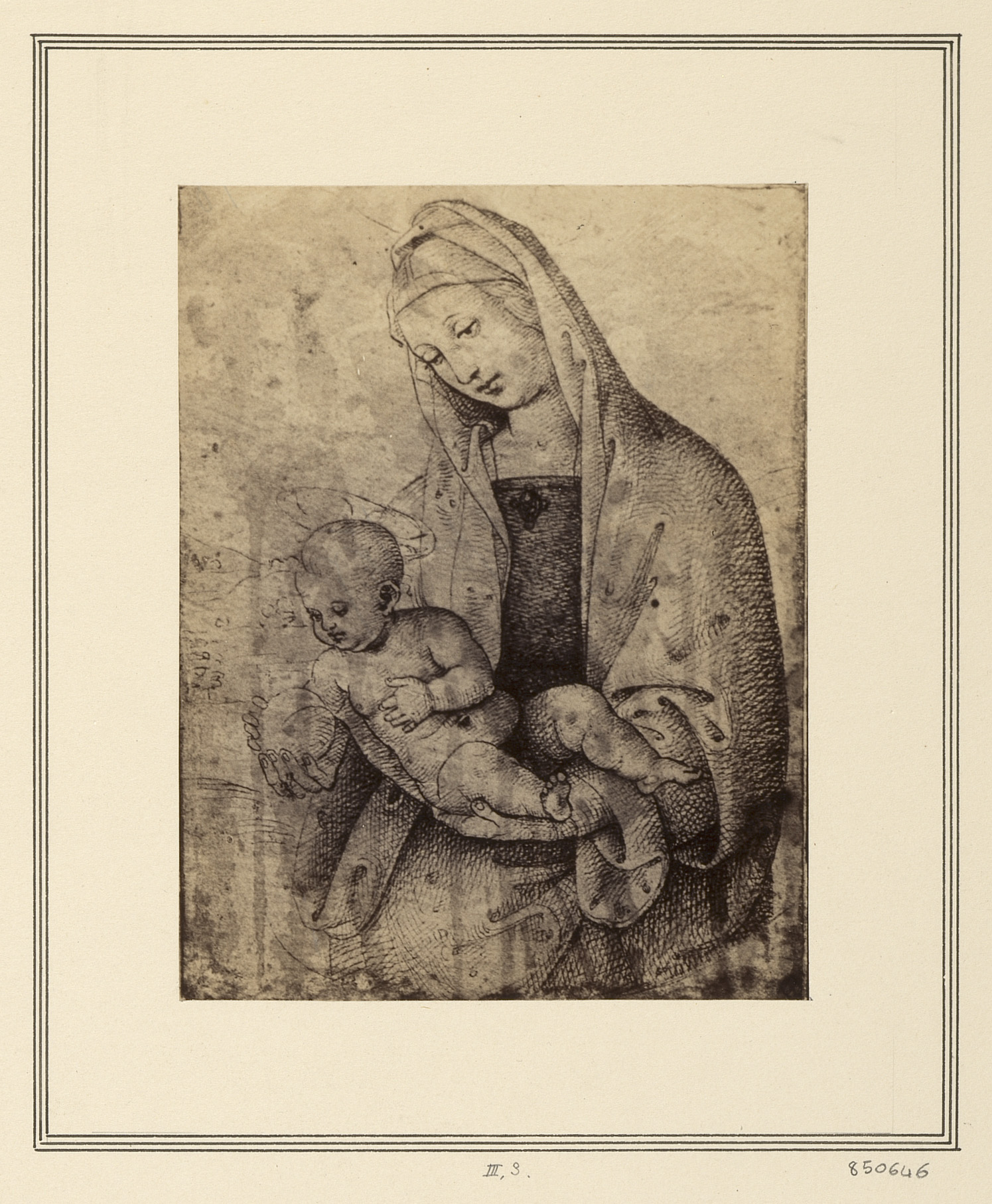
Title: The Virgin and the Child with a Pomegranate

The underdrawing closely resembles Berto di Giovanni's drawing The Virgin and Child with a Pomegranate (now in Berlin). The underdrawing of the Conestabile Madonna appears more hesitant in execution, suggesting preceded Berto di Giovanni's drawing.

The Conestabile Madonna shares stylistic and compositional similarities with Raphael’s later works. Raphael revisited his original arrangement of the work in a Vienna drawing, incorporating both a pomegranate and a book to expand upon the painting’s symbolic elements.

== Provenance ==
The Alfani family owned the artwork around 1600 in Perugia. It likely came to the family through Domenico Alfani (c. 1480-1533), who collaborated with Raphael in Perugia. Hugo Chapman thought the piece to have been acquired by Alfano di Diamante (c. 1465-1550), a prominent merchant banker and head of the Alfani family. Alfano became acquainted with Raphael and later witnessed in 1516 a contract in which Raphael agreed to paint an altarpiece for him. Later, the Conestabile della Staffa acquired the painting in Perugia. Around 1868, the National Gallery showed significant interest in the painting. Instead, Tsar Alexander II purchased it in 1871. Afterward, it passed to the Hermitage Museum in Saint Petersburg in 1880, where it resides today.

== See also ==
- List of paintings by Raphael
