= Self-portrait (Raphael) =

Painting by Raphael

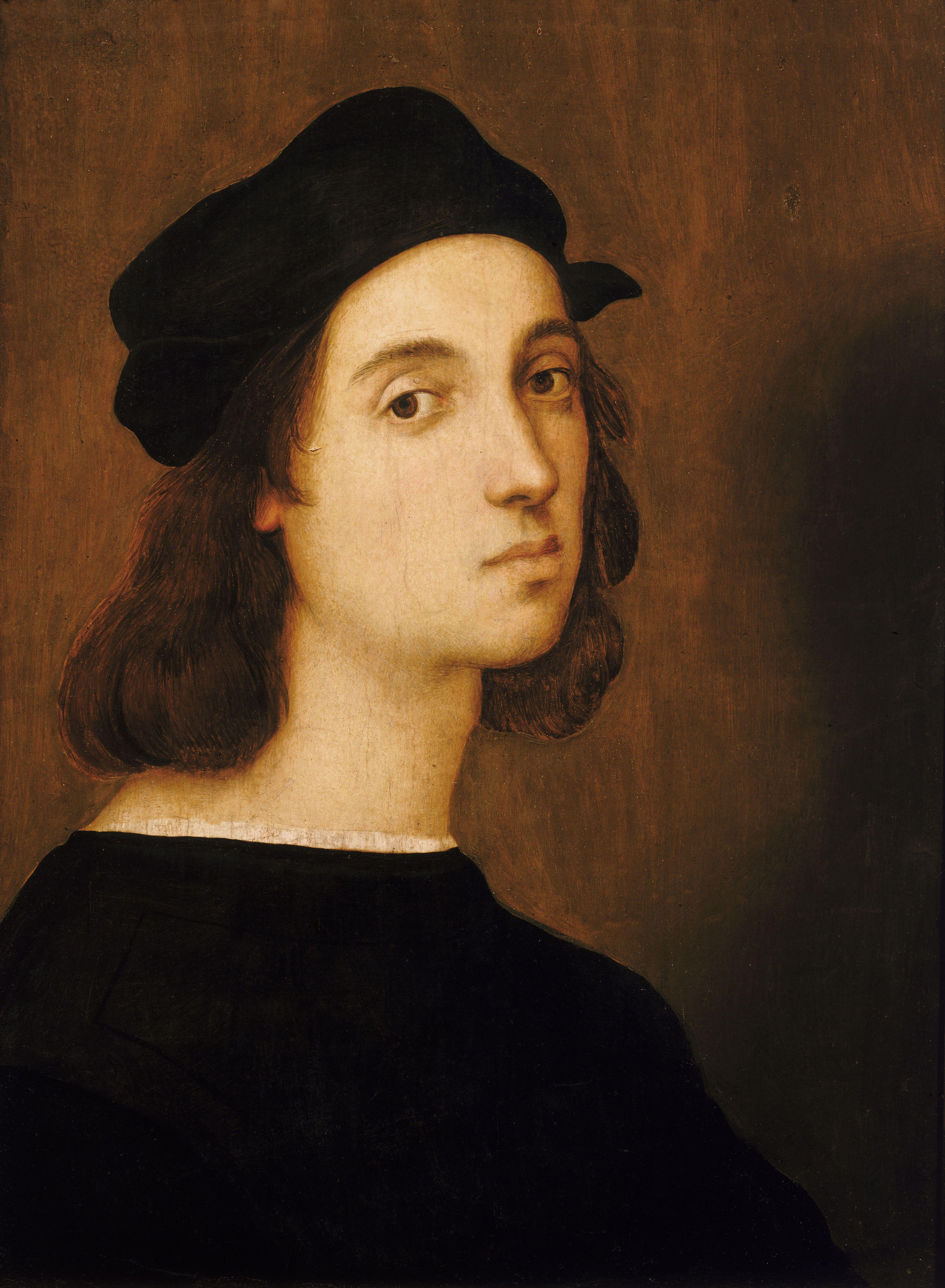
- Artist: Raphael
- Year: 1504–1506
- Type: Portrait
- Medium: Oil paint on poplar wood
- Movement: High Renaissance
- Dimensions: 47.3 cm × 34.8 cm (18.6 in × 13.7 in)
- Location: Uffizi; Florence

Self-Portrait is a small oil painting on poplar wood by the Italian Renaissance artist Raphael. It is believed to have been painted between 1504 and 1506 during his formative years in Florence. The work portrays the artist in a simple black robe and bonnet, set against a plain brown background with his shadow cast to the right. The self-portrait reflects the influence of both Leonardo da Vinci⁣⁣ and Northern European painting traditions. The work may be unfinished. Technical analysis, such as infrared reflectography, has confirmed its authorship.

Originally housed in the Palazzo Ducale in Urbino, the painting was transferred to Florence in 1631 and then became part of Leopoldo de' Medici's collection, which is now held in the Uffizi. It is considered one of the few surviving examples of Raphael’s portraiture from before 1508.

== Description ==
The painting depicts Raphael's head and shoulders on a plain brown background, with his shadow projected to the right. The collar of the sitter’s shirt remains bare and unpainted, revealing exposed gesso and some underdrawing. The hair also looks unfinished, as it does not overlap the brown background. His hairstyle, attire, and bonnet are similar to those of a Renaissance court page. He wears a dark cap, later known as a "raffaella," that was the kind worn by painters, as well as a dark robe, with just a small visible part of a white undershirt. He is dressed in his work clothes, a possible nod to his profession. He has a symmetrical and well-proportioned face that shows a calm and simple expression.

The Self-Portrait was sent to Florence in 1631, where it was described as "un ritratto di Raffaello di sua mano" ("a portrait of Raphael by his own hand"). Raphael's expressions and appearance resemble his self-portrait in the school of Athens, suggesting that the portrait shows the artist in his early twenties.

The work is oil on poplar and is 47.3 cm (18.6 in) high and 34.8 cm (13.7 in) wide.

== Historical context ==
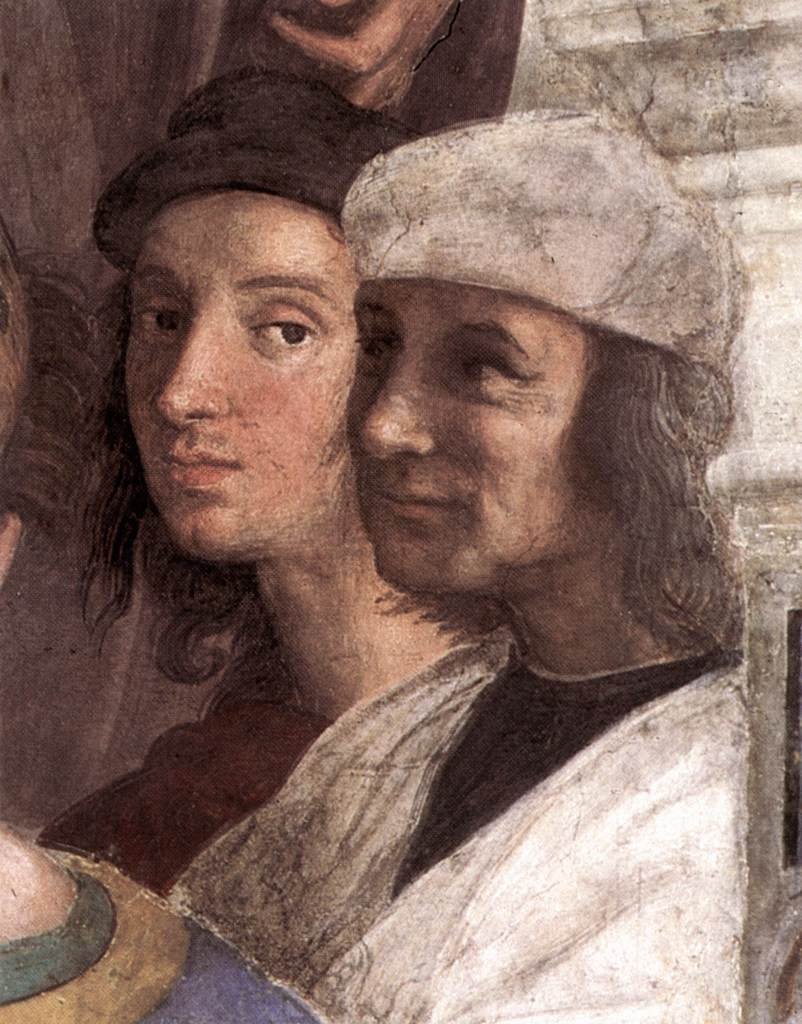
Self-portrait of Raphael, detail from The School of Athens

Raphael's self-portraits were a significant part of his repertoire and played an essential role in shaping his public image, contributing to his awarded reputation. He inserted his own portraits into his paintings of other themes, such as the School of Athens.

Raphael's work was heavily influenced by Leonardo, particularly in his use of chiaroscuro and sfumato. However, Raphael's approach was unique due to his use of soft contours and calm facial expressions when depicting human subjects.

This is one of the few portraits by Raphael that remain from before 1508. This particular piece is well known due to the number of drawn, painted, and engraved copies that came after it. Its notoriety owes more to its subject than to its qualities as a painting.

== Provenance and exhibition history ==
The Self-Portrait is believed to have been painted between 1504 and 1506, during the early years of Raphael’s career when he was working in Florence. Raphael was a key figure of the High Renaissance in Italy, a time when self-portraits remained relatively uncommon. The painting originally came from the Palazzo Ducale in Urbino and was moved to Florence in 1631. It has been restored multiple times and is now regarded as having a worn or abraded surface.

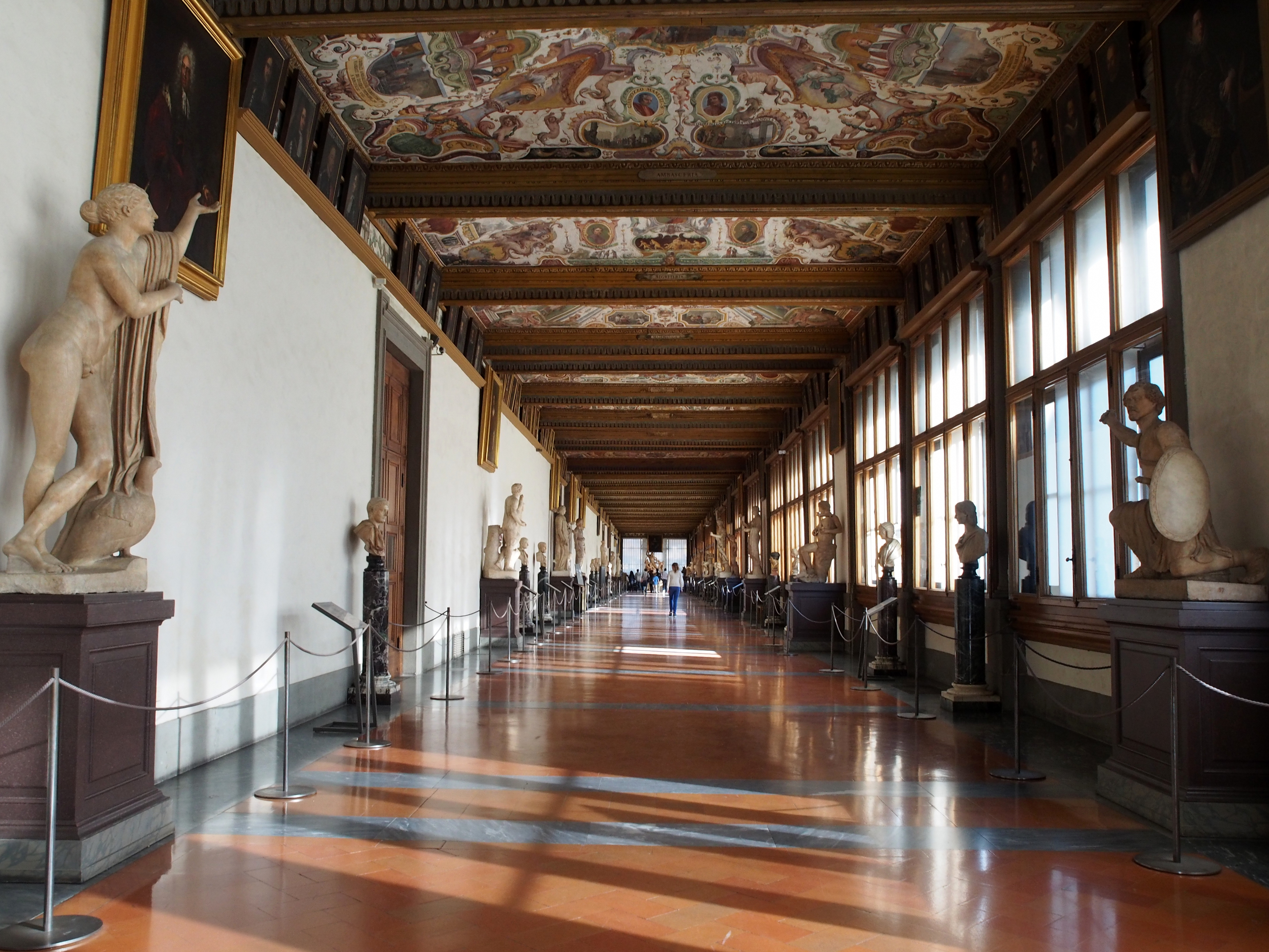
Uffizi Gallery Hallway

The work may have entered the Medici collection through Vittoria della Rovere. Upon her engagement to Ferdinando, as part of her dowry, she brought several prized artworks from her family’s collection to Florence. Between 1663 and 1667, a self-portrait was recorded in Cardinal Leopoldo de' Medici's collection titled "Portraits of painters painted by their own hand." This group of works would eventually become the foundation of the Uffizi Gallery’s renowned self-portrait collection and is world-renowned as the largest and most valuable of its kind.

While remains unclear exactly how Cardinal Leopoldo de’ Medici acquired the painting, it is likely that it was a gift from his sister-in-law, Vittoria della Rovere. Art historians now regard this explanation as more convincing than the alternative idea that he acquired it from the Accademia di San Luca in ⁣⁣Rome.

The portrait appeared in a 1675 inventory of Duke Leopoldo de' Medici's private collection and was subsequently listed in the Uffizi's 1890 inventory.

== Technical analysis and Flemish influence ==
The painting’s authorship by Raphael was confirmed through investigations conducted in 1983 for an exhibition at Palazzo Pitti commemorating the artist's birth anniversary. Using reflectography, researchers analyzed the preparatory drawing and paint application techniques, uncovering Raphael’s meticulous process. Raphael painted luminous, translucent glazes over a white-primed background.

The method of translucent glazed employed by Raphael in this piece showcase his engagement with Flemish painting, which is thought to have greatly influenced the court of Urbino. Notable Northern European artists, such as Justus van Gent and Pedro Berruguete, had worked there, introducing their artistic style elements, which Raphael integrated into his own work.

== Finish and authenticity ==
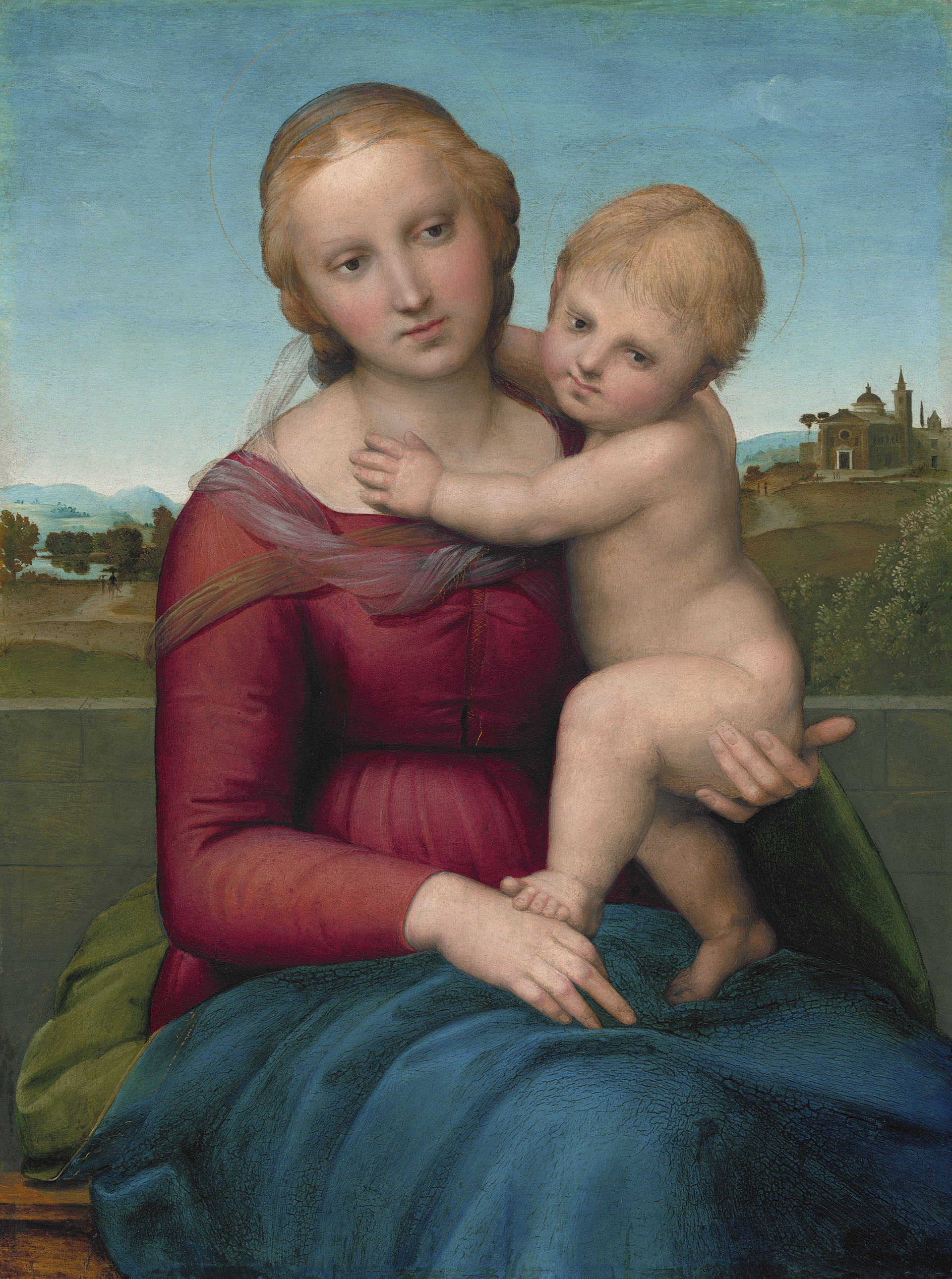
Small Cowper Madonna (1504-1505)

The Self-Portrait has undergone restoration treatments and laboratory analysis, which have informed debates about its authorship. Prior to its restoration, many scholars regarded the work as a later copy of Raphael as shown in the School of Athens fresco.

However, infrared photographs have shown that the picture has the same exploratory sketches as Raphael's independent drawings, suggesting that he produced the work himself. These underdrawings are also comparable with those found in the Small Cowper Madonna. The distinctive treatment of the lines is consistent with Raphael's style and cannot be attributed to a copyist.

Close examination of the hair and flesh tones after cleaning the painting suggests that the work was left unfinished. The reasons for the painting's incomplete state remain unclear. It is also uncertain whether the black&white-burger costume, coat, and bonnet were created by Raphael himself or added later to present a more finished appearance.

== See also ==
- List of paintings by Raphael
