= Diotallevi Madonna =

1504 painting by Raphael

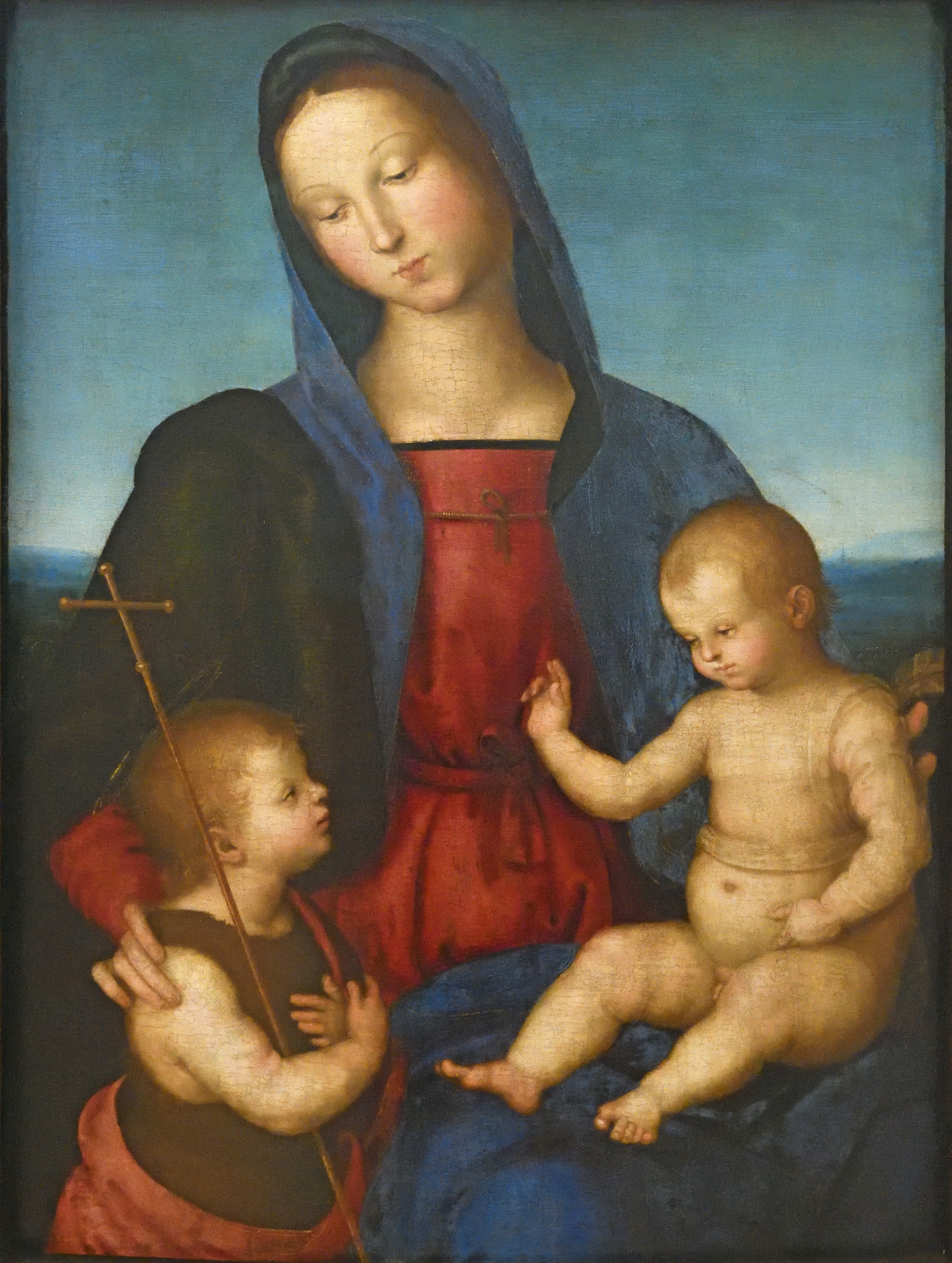
- Artist: Raphael
- Year: c. 1504
- Subject: Virgin Mary, Baby Jesus, and Infant John the Baptist
- Location: Bode Museum, Berlin

The Diotallevi Madonna is an oil on panel painting by Raphael, created c. 1504. It is held in the Bode Museum, in Berlin, where it entered in 1841-1842 from Marquess Diotallevi's collection in Rimini. Previously attributed to Raphael's teacher Perugino, almost all art historians now attribute it to Raphael, with the exception of Adolfo Venturi who attributes it and parts of Perugino's Madonna della Consolazione to an anonymous, "Master of the Diotallevi Madonna".

The physiognomy and composition still draw heavily on Perugino. Roberto Longhi noted the more archaic painting of the Madonna compared to the work on the Christ Child and John the Baptist, leading him to theorise that it had been worked on around 1500–1502, abandoned and then completed in Florence around 1504–1505.

== See also ==
- List of paintings by Raphael
