= Portrait of a Young Woman (La Muta) =

Painting by Raphael

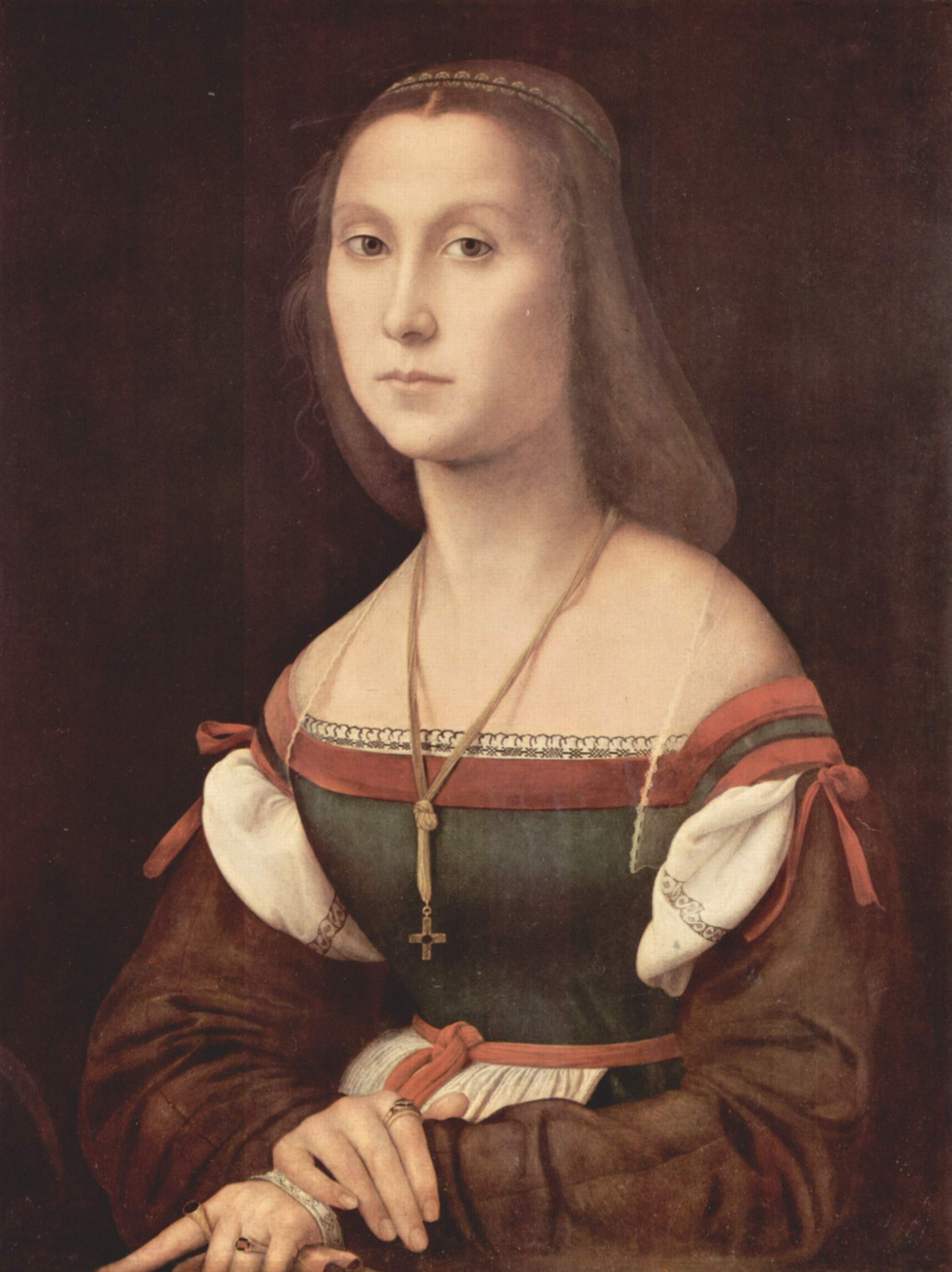
- Artist: Raphael
- Year: c. 1507–1508
- Medium: Oil on wood
- Dimensions: 64 cm × 48 cm (25 in × 19 in)
- Location: Galleria Nazionale delle Marche, Urbino

The Portrait of a Young Woman, also known as La Muta, is an oil on wood portrait by the Italian Renaissance artist Raphael, executed c. 1507–1508. It is housed in the Galleria Nazionale delle Marche, in Urbino.

The picture portrays an unknown noblewoman over a near-black background, showing some Leonardesque influences. Ingrid D. Rowland writes that "the vivid contrast between dark background and luminous skin ... would one day inspire Michelangelo Merisi da Caravaggio to change his palette — in Rome — and become the Caravaggio we know best." Although only recently attributed to Raphael, La Muta is ranked among the best portraits by his hand.

The neatness of the large areas of colour that emerge in lighter tones from the background, and the analytical treatment of the details of the woman's clothing, are characteristic of Raphael. The dispersive effect of this attention to detail is fully compensated by the tones of colour — used here in a fairly limited range — which unify the composition as a whole.

Nicoletta Baldini describes the hands in this portrait as "vibratile," distinguishing it from those painted by Michelangelo or Da Vinci. Ingrid D. Rowland writes that the "austerely attractive young noblewoman ... is poking her index finger against the edge of the picture, literally, and knowingly, pushing its envelope of illusion — hence the mischievous glint in her eye."

X-ray analysis has shown the presence of an early Raphael drawing under the painting, of a female, young face with soft features, with later modifications.

== See also ==
- List of paintings by Raphael
