= Madonna della Tenda =

Painting by Raphael

Madonna della tenda
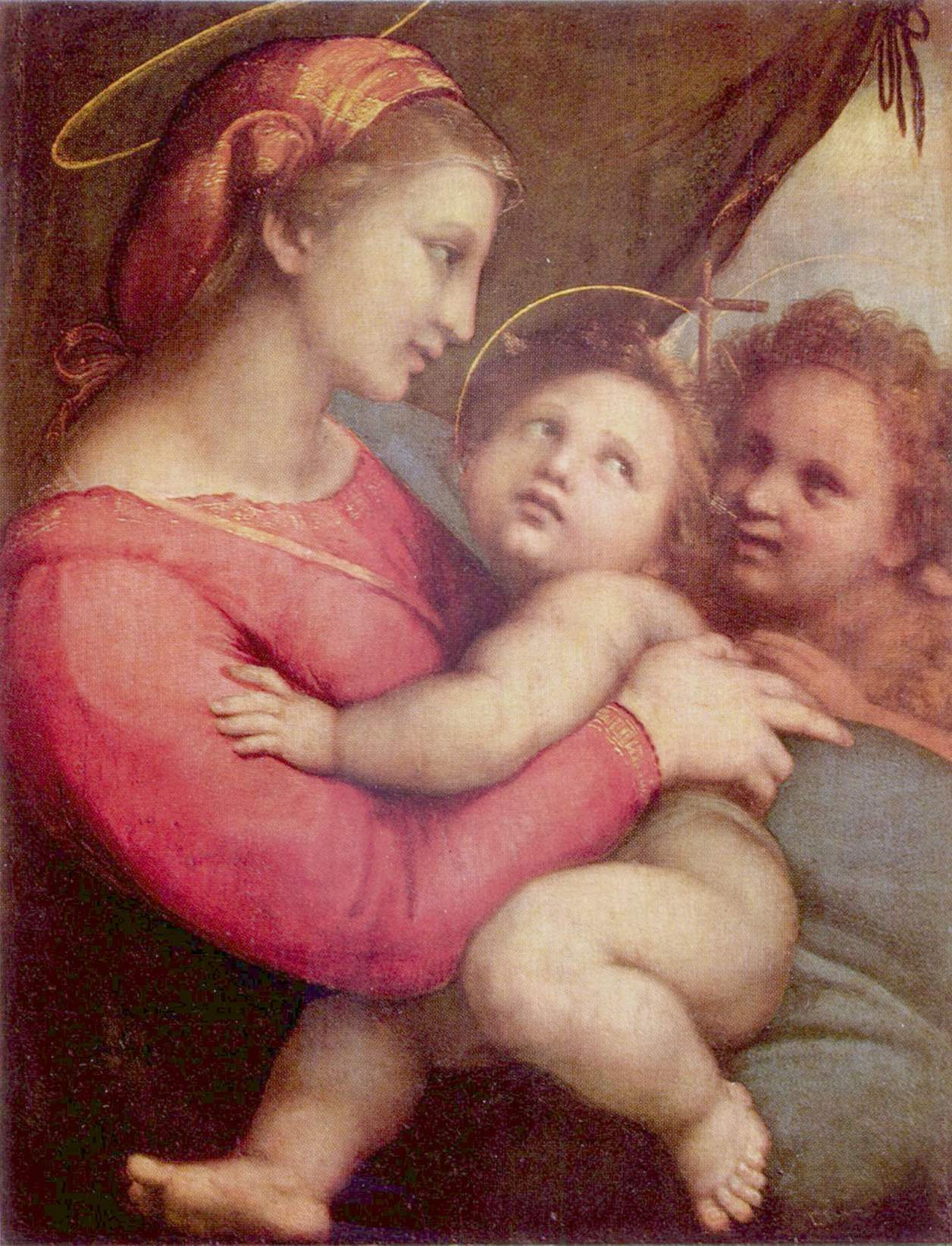
- Artist: Raphael
- Year: c. 1513-1514
- Medium: Oil on panel
- Dimensions: 65.8 cm × 51.2 cm (25.9 in × 20.2 in)
- Location: Alte Pinakothek, Munich

The Madonna della tenda is an oil on panel painting by the Italian renaissance artist Raphael, created c. 1513–1514. It shows Mary embracing the child Christ, while the young John the Baptist watches. The design of the painting resembles that of the Madonna della seggiola from the same period.

== See also ==
- List of paintings by Raphael
