= Portrait of a Cardinal (Raphael) =

Painting by Raphael

- Artist: Raphael
- Year: c. 1510–1511
- Medium: Oil on wood
- Dimensions: 79 cm × 61 cm (31 in × 24 in)
- Location: Museo del Prado, Madrid

Portrait of a Cardinal, or simply The Cardinal, is an oil on panel painting by the Italian Renaissance artist Raphael, dated to c. 1510–1511. It is held by the Prado Museum in Madrid.

Raphael had arrived in Rome in 1508, and quickly found great success during the papacy of Pope Julius II. He mastered the art of realism in his paintings: the ability to "paint people as more real than they really are", as Pietro Bembo put it.

The three-quarter length portrait depicts a young cardinal, probably in his thirties, seated, wearing a red cape and cap with white shirt, against a dark background, looking calmly towards the viewer. Pentimenti show that Raphael shortened the hair, and moved the left eye. The identify of the subject has been a matter of considerable debate, with proposed candidates in the court of Pope Julius II including Bernardo Dovizi (known as Bibbiena), Innocenzo Cybo, Scaramuccia Trivulzio, Alessandro Farnese, Ippolito d'Este, Silvio Passerini, Antonio Ciocchi, Matthäus Schiner or Luigi d'Aragona.

According to the Prado, it is perhaps most likely to be Francesco Alidosi (1455–1511), also depicted by Raphael in his 1509–1510 work the Disputation of the Holy Sacrament, or possibly Bendinello Sauli (c. 1481–1518).

The seated subject's upright body and horizontal left arm, resting on an unseen arm of a chair, create a triangular composition, after Leonardo da Vinci's Mona Lisa. The strong lighting makes striking contrasts between the red of the cardinal's hat and cape, the whiteness of his sleeve and face, and the dark background. Meticulous brushstrokes give the audience a three-dimensional character, revealing Rapahel's interest in sculpture during those years.

The painting was bought in Rome by Charles IV of Spain (1748–1819), while he was still the Prince of Asturias. Due to its technique, which was considered unusual for Raphael, the picture was attributed to Antonio Moro for some time before the attribution was reassessed. The work entered the Spanish royal collection, and was catalogued at the Royal Palace of Aranjuez in 1818; it was later transferred to the Prado.

== See also ==
- List of paintings by Raphael
