= Portrait of Pietro Bembo (Raphael) =

Painting by Raphael

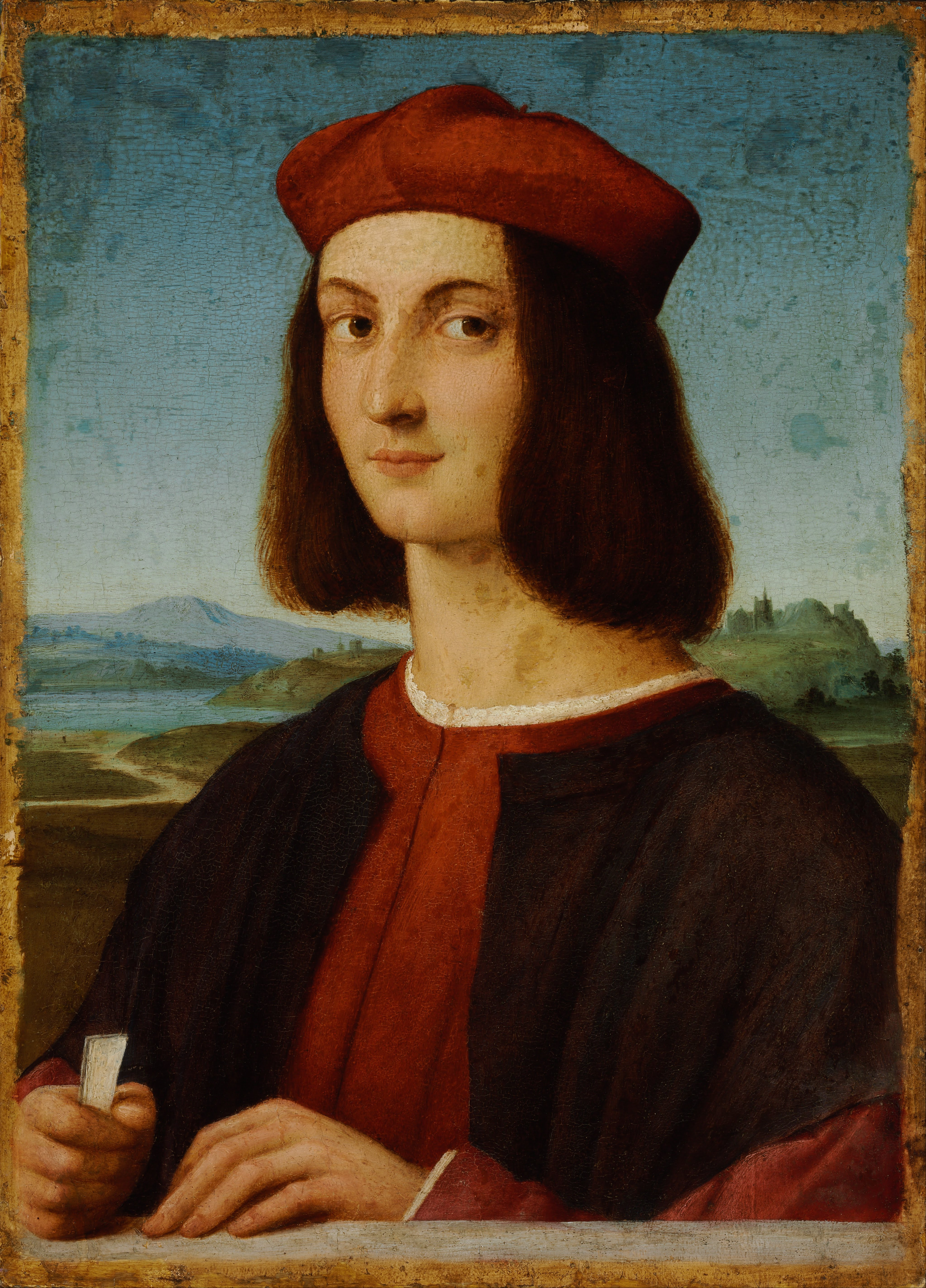
- Artist: Raphael
- Year: c. 1504
- Medium: Oil on wood
- Dimensions: 54 cm × 69 cm (21 in × 27 in)
- Location: Museum of Fine Arts, Budapest

Portrait of Pietro Bembo, also called Portrait of the Young Pietro Bembo, is an oil painting by Italian artist Raphael. Completed c. 1504, the painting hangs in the Museum of Fine Arts in Budapest.

The lack of resemblance of this picture to its namesake, particularly in the nose, has led to other subjects being proposed, including Agnolo Doni, whom Raphael painted around the same time. In a 2004 biography of Bembo, Carol Kidwell states that the subject "appears a happy courtier, not a man set on making his mark in the world, and he wears a red beret while Venetian noblemen wore black."

== History ==
The image is ostensibly a portrait of Venetian Cardinal Pietro Bembo, Raphael's long-time friend. Raphael did make a black chalk drawing of Bembo during Bembo's visit to Urbino in 1506. The picture hung in Bembo's home for years before it disappeared.

The painting became part of the Esterházy collection and came to the museum in 1820, attributed to Bernardino Luini. In 1884, Louis Viardot was the first to attribute the painting to Raphael, followed by Johann David Passavant, Giovanni Morelli (1886), and Ferenc Pulszky (1896).

Modern critics have accepted the attribution to Raphael, although with certain reservations, in particular those of Bernard Berenson, Sergio Ortolani and Francesco Brizio, with a dating close to the year 1504 or a very close period.

== See also ==
- List of paintings by Raphael
