= Ansidei Madonna =

Painting by Raphael

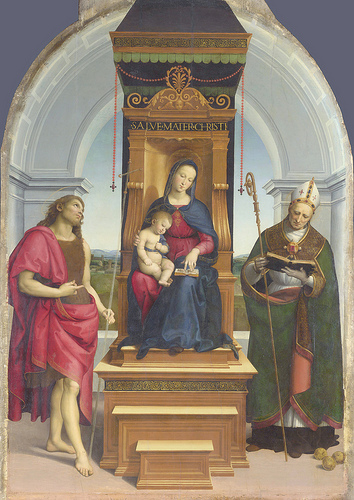
- Artist: Raphael
- Year: 1505–1507
- Type: Oil on wood (poplar)
- Dimensions: 216.8 cm × 147.6 cm (85.4 in × 58.1 in)
- Location: National Gallery, London

The Ansidei Madonna (Italian: Pala Ansidei) is a 1505–1507 painting by the Italian High Renaissance artist Raphael, painted during his Florentine period. It shows the Blessed Virgin Mary sitting on a wooden throne, with the child Christ on her lap. On her right John the Baptist stands, on her left Saint Nicholas is reading.

At the time the painting was commissioned, there were other paintings that made up the grouping for the altarpiece. Of the predellas, the only that remains is Saint John the Baptist Preaching, the others are inexplicably lost.

Both the main painting, "Ansidei Madonna", and the predella "Saint John the Baptist Preaching", are located at the National Gallery in London.

== The painting ==
The Virgin sits formally on a high throne, with an adult Saint John the Baptist on the left, and Saint Nicholas of Bari to the right. Painted for effect rather than realism, the throne has no arms and the steps are steep, but beautifully set off the arches above and the approach to the throne.

=== Excellence through serenity and divinity ===
The Ansidei Madonna was greatly influenced by the strict expression of divinity of the Umbrian School within his Florentine Period. Above the Madonna's throne is inscribed "Hail, Mother of Christ." This compares to the more natural poses and interaction found in Madonna, the Christ Child and infant John the Baptist in paintings of his Roman period.

Per Ruskin of the National Gallery, the painting is considered one of the greatest paintings in history, and as such an embodiment of the best of Christianity, for several reasons. First, the execution was near perfect and well-weathered the test of centuries of time. The gold within the painting looks real, but was totally painted by affect. Secondly, another test of a great painting, the characters look serene. Third, the painting attracts attention to the spirit or soul of a character, rather than their appearance. And, last, you see joy, contentment or beauty in the face of the subject, not negative connotations, such as pain or vileness.

Each subject and the landscape of "Ansidei Madonna" evokes serenity and divinity:

- Madonna, by her complete devotion to her child,
- Christ child through his secure faith in his mother,
- St. John through his contemplative expression of his spiritual journey,
- Bishop Nicholas of Bari through spiritual knowledge, and
- the soothing landscape and the open, infinite sky, closest to God.

The three balls at Bishop Nicholas' feet may symbolize the holy trinity, or the three bags of gold he is said to have thrown into the window of a poor man's home for his daughters' welfare.

=== Young master ===
Raphael's years in Florence exposed him to a plethora of artistic influences, first his teacher Perugino and then others, such as Donatello's sculptured marble, Masaccio's frescoes, Michelangelo's David, Leonardo da Vinci's paintings, and so much more which Raphael used to develop his fine-tuned sense of style, composition and execution as seen in the "Ansidei Madonna".

Raphael demonstrated skill in Ansidei Madonna through execution of every minute detail. At the young age of twenty-three, Raphael depicted to well-represented subjects, through careful execution. Care is represented by what one does – and what one does not do, or more clearly: "There is a saying that a true artist is known best by what he omits." Consider the landscape behind our subjects, it is restrained and not crowded with detail. color is used selectively, as seen in jeweled robe and the chaplet of red coral.

In 1508 Raphael arrived in Rome at the age of twenty-five and already a great reputation as a master of the arts, known for such works as "Madonna of the Grand Duke", "Madonna of the Goldfinch", "Ansidei Madonna" and more.

=== Isolated characters of the Umbrian school ===
The Virgin Mary, Saint John and Bishop Nicholas are isolated from one another, without interchange, a style common in the Umbrian school, and particularly Perugino.

== Commission and provenance ==
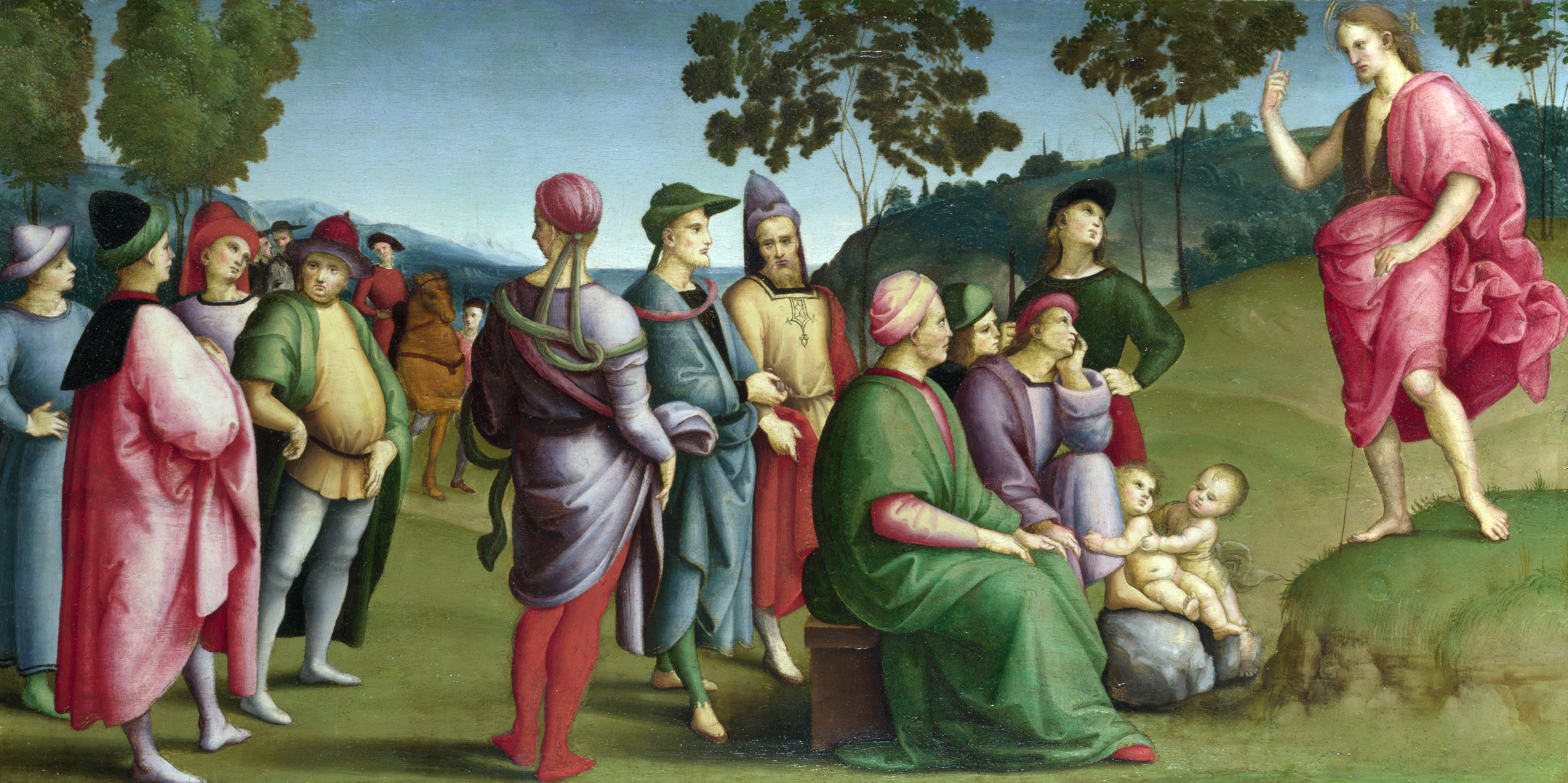
Saint John the Baptist preaching, one of the paintings on the predella for Ansidei Madonna. National Gallery, London

Niccolò Ansidei commissioned Raphael to paint an altarpiece of a group of paintings titled "The Madonna and Child with Saint John the Baptist and Saint Nicholas of Bari (The Ansidei Madonna)" for his family chapel dedicated to Saint Nicholas in the church of San Fiorenzo, Perugia.

Two paintings formed the predella for Raphael's altarpiece the "Ansidei Madonna." The first, "Saint John the Baptist Preaching", was placed beneath the image of Saint John in the main altarpiece, and is now owned by the National Gallery. The panels that depicted her betrothal, positioned below the Virgin and Child, and another below Saint Nicholas of one of his miracles have not survived.

There is some question about the date, or dates, of the painting. Original understanding was that the painting was begun in 1505, fitting with Raphael's style at that time, strongly influenced by Perugino. Careful observation revealed that the painting was dated 1507. One can fairly reasonably assume, however, based upon Raphael's style, that the work was started in 1505 and finished in 1507.

The chapel that housed the "Ansidei Madonna" was dismantled in 1763 when the church of San Fiorenzo was remodeled. The chapel was reassembled and now contains a 19th-century copy of its original altarpiece, the "Ansidei Madonna", by Raphael. The work was bought by young Lord Robert Spencer in 1764, for an undisclosed, but apparently large sum of money as a gift to his brother, the 4th Duke of Marlborough. Placed in Blenheim Palace, one of the most magnificent buildings in Europe and home of the Duke of Marlborough, the work was sometimes known as the "Blenheim Madonna."

"Ansidei Madonna", considered "one of the most perfect pictures of the world", of the Blenheim Collection was sold by George Spencer-Churchill, 8th Duke of Marlborough, under the Lord Cairn's Act for £75,000 or nearly unanimously cited at £70,000, which was about $350,000, to the London National Gallery in 1885. At the time, this was three times the highest amount paid for a painting, likely in large part because there were few Raphael paintings placed in foreign galleries at that time.

== See also ==
- List of paintings by Raphael
