= Oddi Altarpiece (Raphael) =

Painting by Raphael

The crowning of the Virgin (Oddi altar)
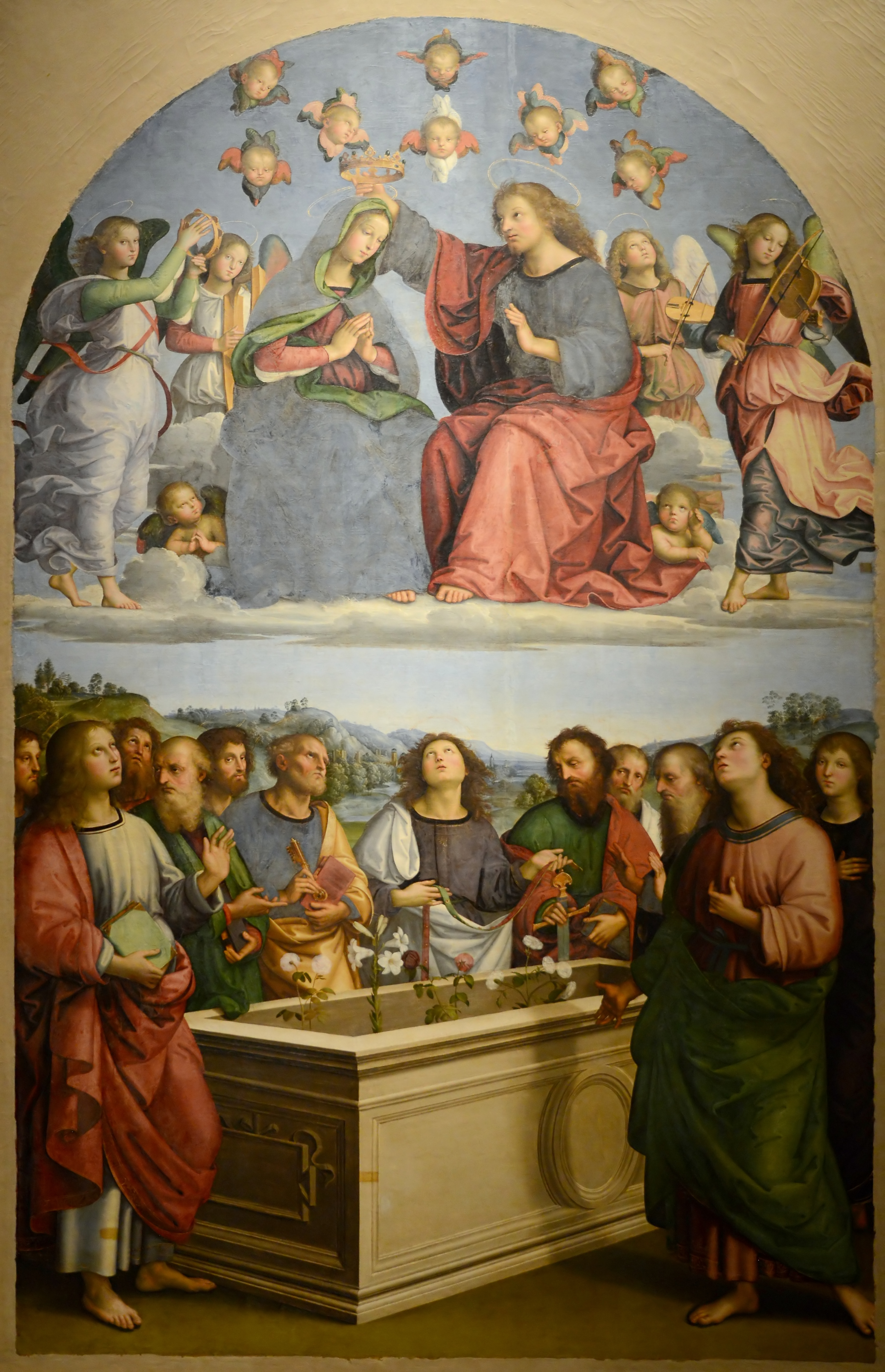
- Artist: Raphael
- Year: 1502-1504
- Type: Oil on wood, transferred to canvas when brought to Paris 1797
- Dimensions: 267 cm × 163 cm (105 in × 64 in)
- Location: Vatican Pinacoteca, Vatican City

The Oddi Altarpiece, or more correctly the degli Oddi altarpiece, is an altarpiece of the Coronation of the Virgin painted in 1502-1504 by the Italian Renaissance master Raphael for the altar of the Oddi family chapel in the church of San Francesco al Prato in Perugia, Italy, now in the Vatican Pinacoteca. The altarpiece was commissioned for the Oddi family chapel in San Francesco al Prato in Perugia, was taken to Paris in 1797 (for the Musée Napoleon) and in 1815 brought back to Italy, not to Perugia but to the Vatican Pinacoteca.

The altarpiece was commissioned by Leandra Baglioni, widow of Simone degli Oddi; in Perugia there were different Oddi and degli Oddi families, but English sources often ignore this, including the English version of the Vatican Museums website.

== The crowning of the Virgin ==
The actions of the painting occur in two related scenes, one in heaven and the other terrestrial. Above the coronation shows the Virgin being crowned by Jesus, while angels are playing music; while below the section depicts the apostles gathering around the empty tomb of Mary, whose body was raised to heaven without corruption. St Thomas holds in his hands the girdle Mary dropped down to him as a testament to her assumption. The saints raise their eyes to the heavenly spectacle.

== The predella ==
The predella (39 × 190 cm) is composed of three 27 × 50 cm paintings, showing scenes of The Life of the Virgin: The Annunciation, The Adoration of the Magi, Presentation in the Temple

Predella panels

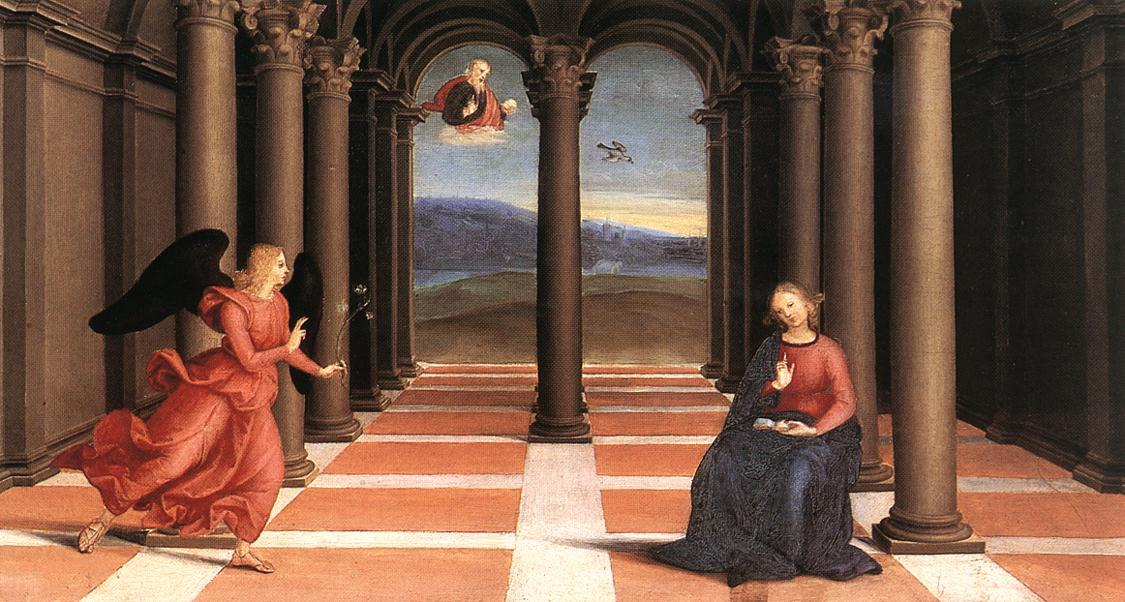
Annunciation

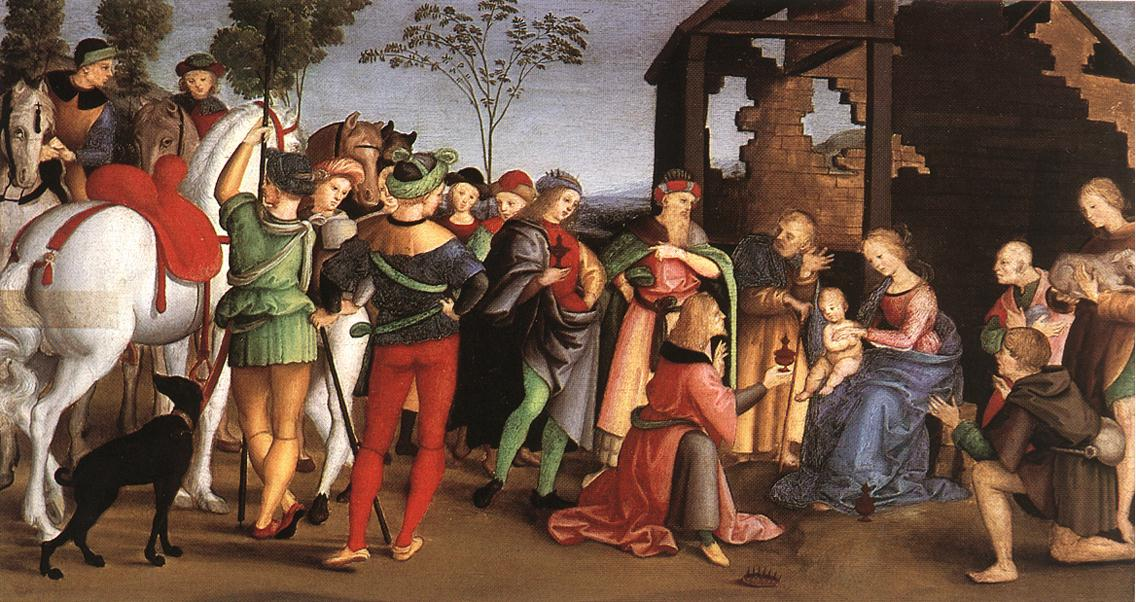
Adoration of the Magi

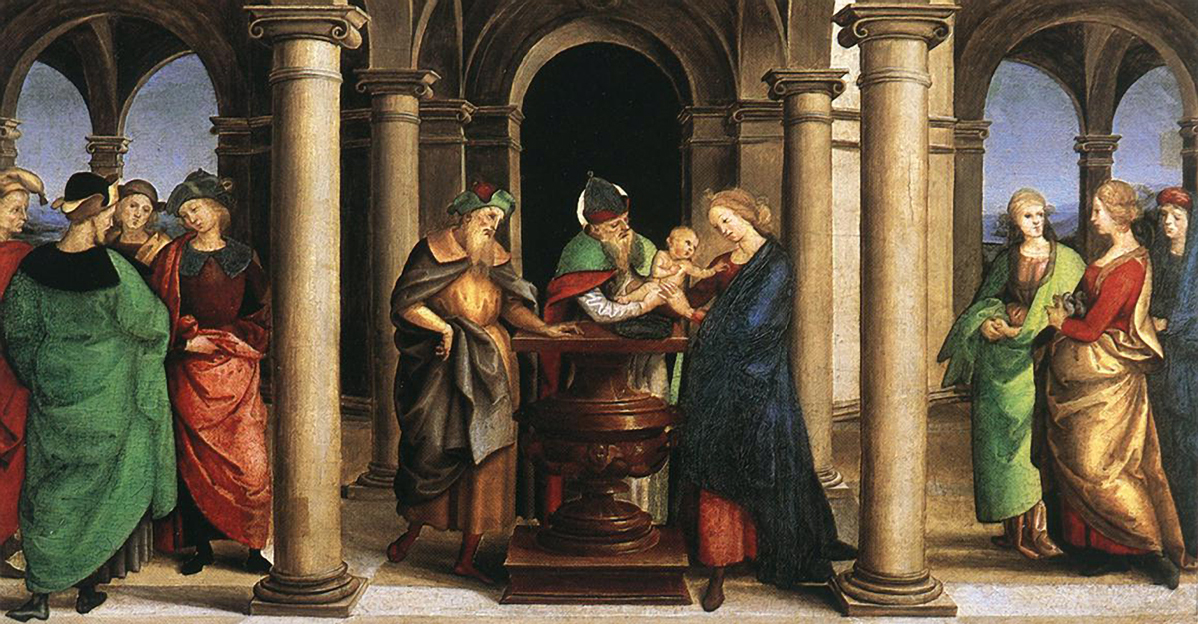
Presentation at the Temple

== See also ==
- List of paintings by Raphael
