= Saint Sebastian (Raphael) =

Painting by Raphael

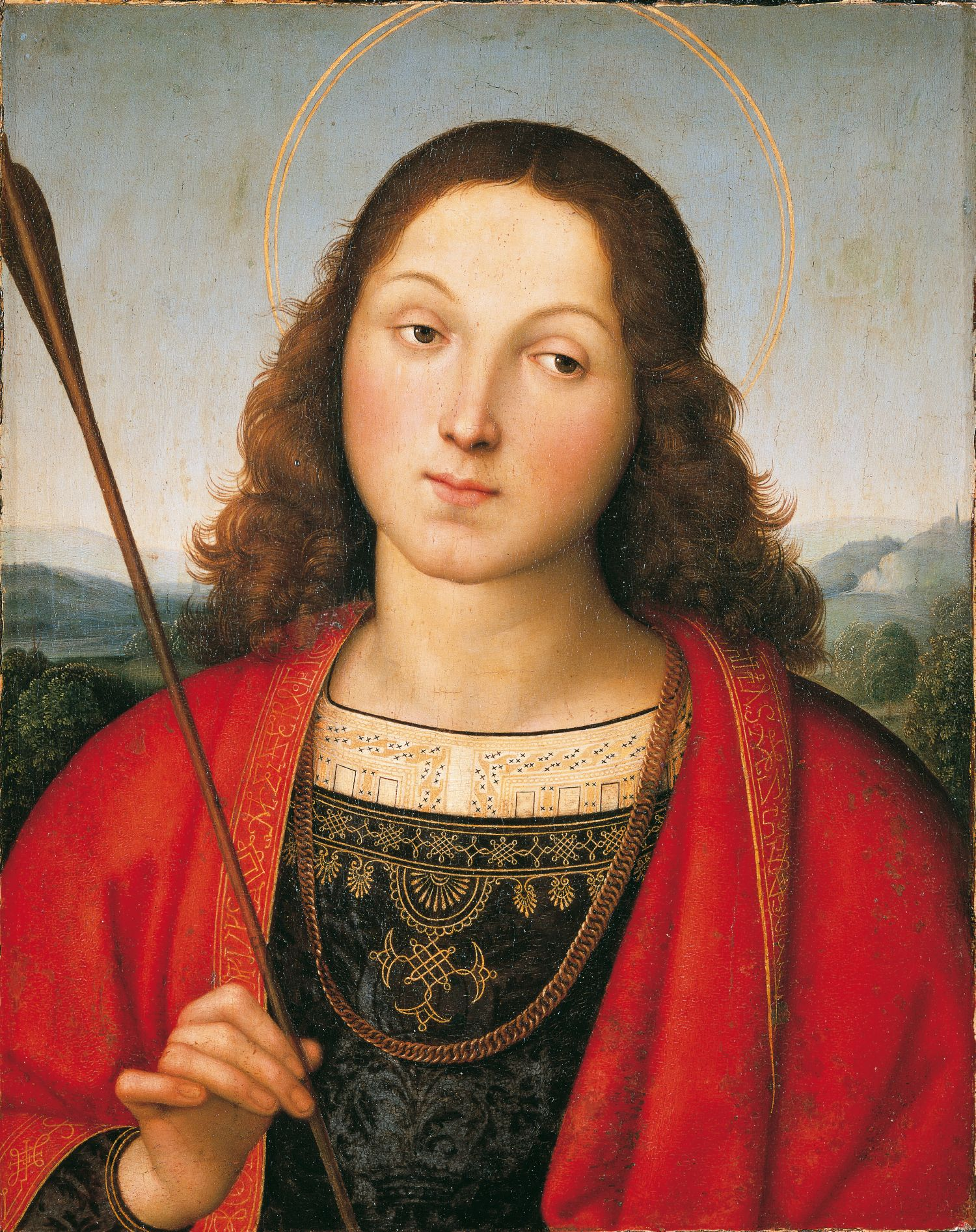
- Artist: Raphael
- Year: 1501–1502
- Medium: Oil on wood
- Dimensions: 43 cm × 34 cm (17 in × 13 in)
- Location: Accademia Carrara, Bergamo

Saint Sebastian is a painting of the early Christian saint and martyr Saint Sebastian painted c. 1501–1502 by the Italian High Renaissance artist Raphael. Part of his early works, it is housed in the Accademia Carrara of Bergamo, Italy. In 2022 the painting was included in an exhibition held at the National Gallery in London.

== See also ==
- List of paintings by Raphael
