= Ezekiel's Vision (Raphael) =

1518 painting

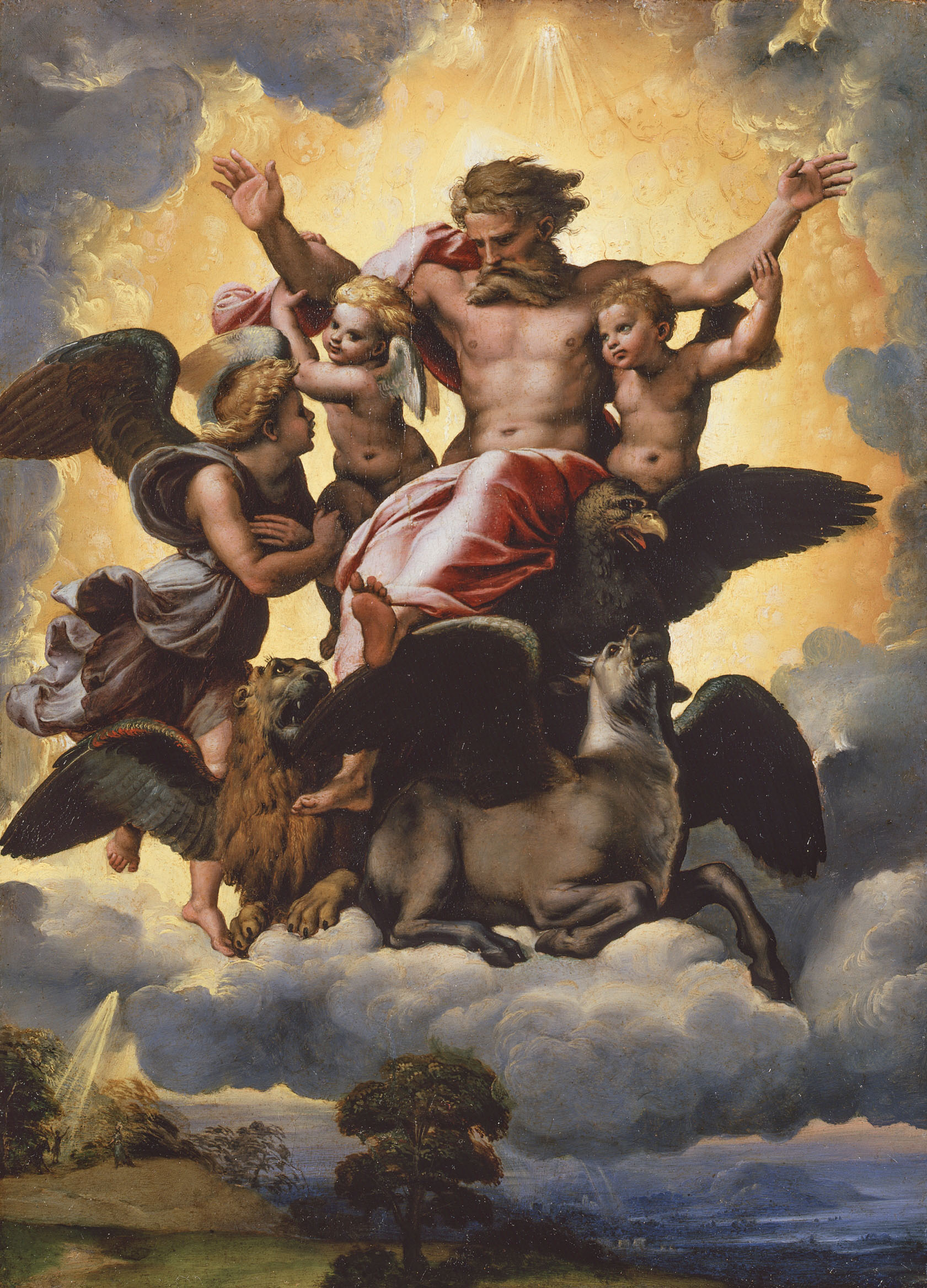
- Artist: Raphael
- Year: c. 1518
- Medium: Oil on panel
- Dimensions: 40 cm × 30 cm (16 in × 12 in)
- Location: Palazzo Pitti, Florence

Ezekiel's Vision is a c. 1518 painting by Raphael showing the prophet Ezekiel's vision of God in majesty. It is housed in the Palatine Gallery of Palazzo Pitti, Florence, central Italy.

== History ==
The work is remembered by Renaissance art biographer Giorgio Vasari as property of a Bolognese nobleman, Vincenzo Ercolani. There is trace of payment by him to Raphael for 8 ducats in 1510, but this is generally considered just a down payment, since stylistically the work (inspired, for example, by Michelangelo's Sistine Chapel ceiling) cannot be dated before 1518.

In Florence since as early as 1589, it was ceded to Francesco I de' Medici and was placed at the Uffizi. The painting is known to be at Palazzo Pitti in 1697. In 1799 it was robbed by the French, who kept it in Paris until returning it back in 1816.

The work was once considered to be by the hand of Giulio Romano, with Raphael providing only the drawing. However, it has been subsequently assigned to Raphael.

== Description ==
The painting measures 40 by 30 centimetres (16 in × 12 in).

== See also ==
- List of paintings by Raphael
