= Young Man with an Apple (Raphael) =

Painting by Raphael

Portrait of Young Man with an Apple
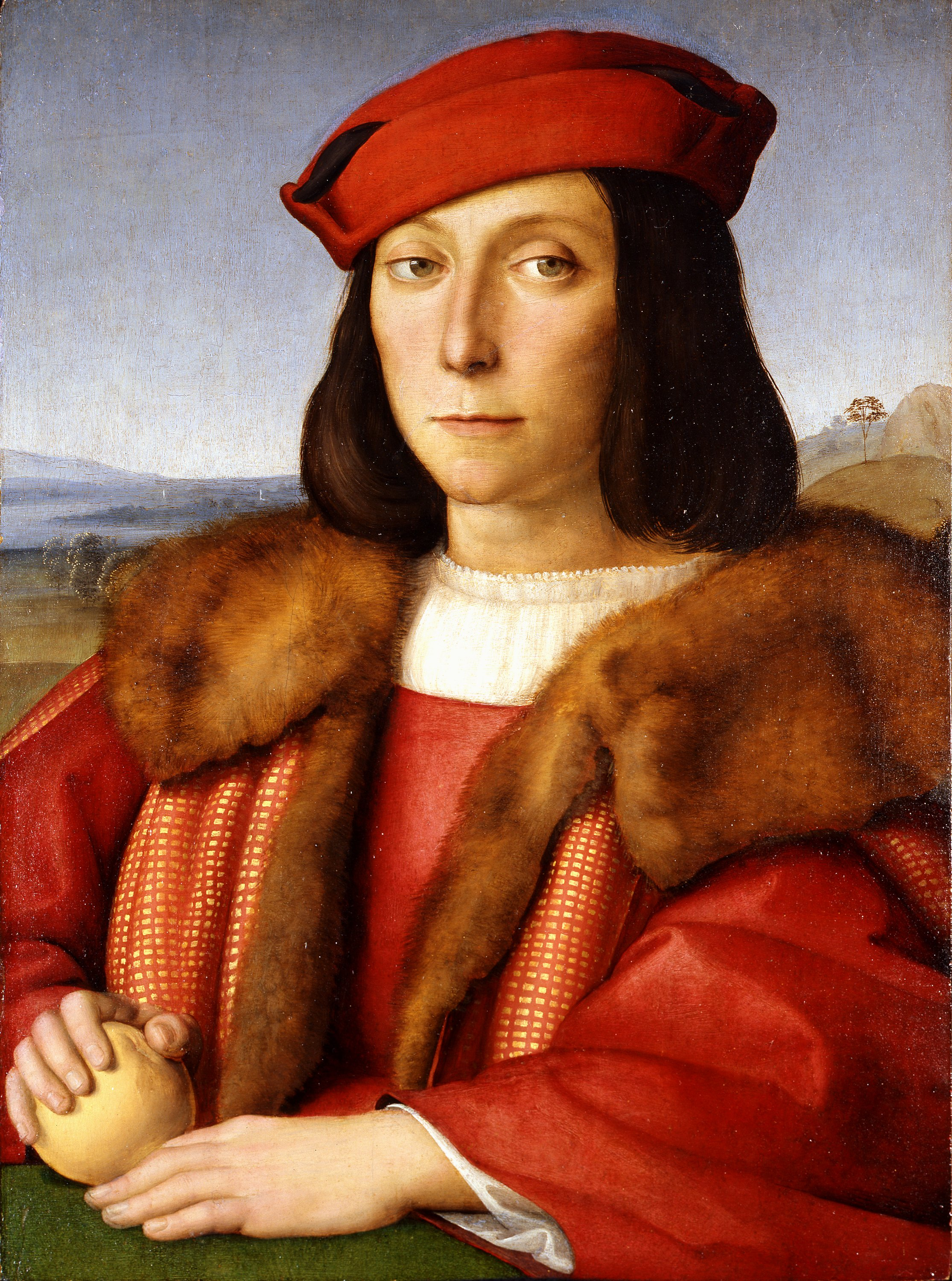
- Artist: Raphael
- Year: c. 1505
- Type: Oil on wood
- Dimensions: 47 cm × 35 cm (19 in × 14 in)
- Location: Uffizi, Florence

The Young Man with an Apple is an oil on poplar painting by the Italian High Renaissance painter Raphael, executed c. 1505. It is housed in the Uffizi Gallery in Florence. Most probably made for the della Rovere/Montefeltro family in Urbino, it is often thought to be the portrait of Francesco Maria I della Rovere, grandson of Federico da Montefeltro and future Duke of Urbino through an adoption arranged in 1504 by his uncle, pope Julius II.

== See also ==
- List of paintings by Raphael
