= Madonna of the Rose (Raphael) =

Painting by Raphael

- Madonna della rosa (Italian)
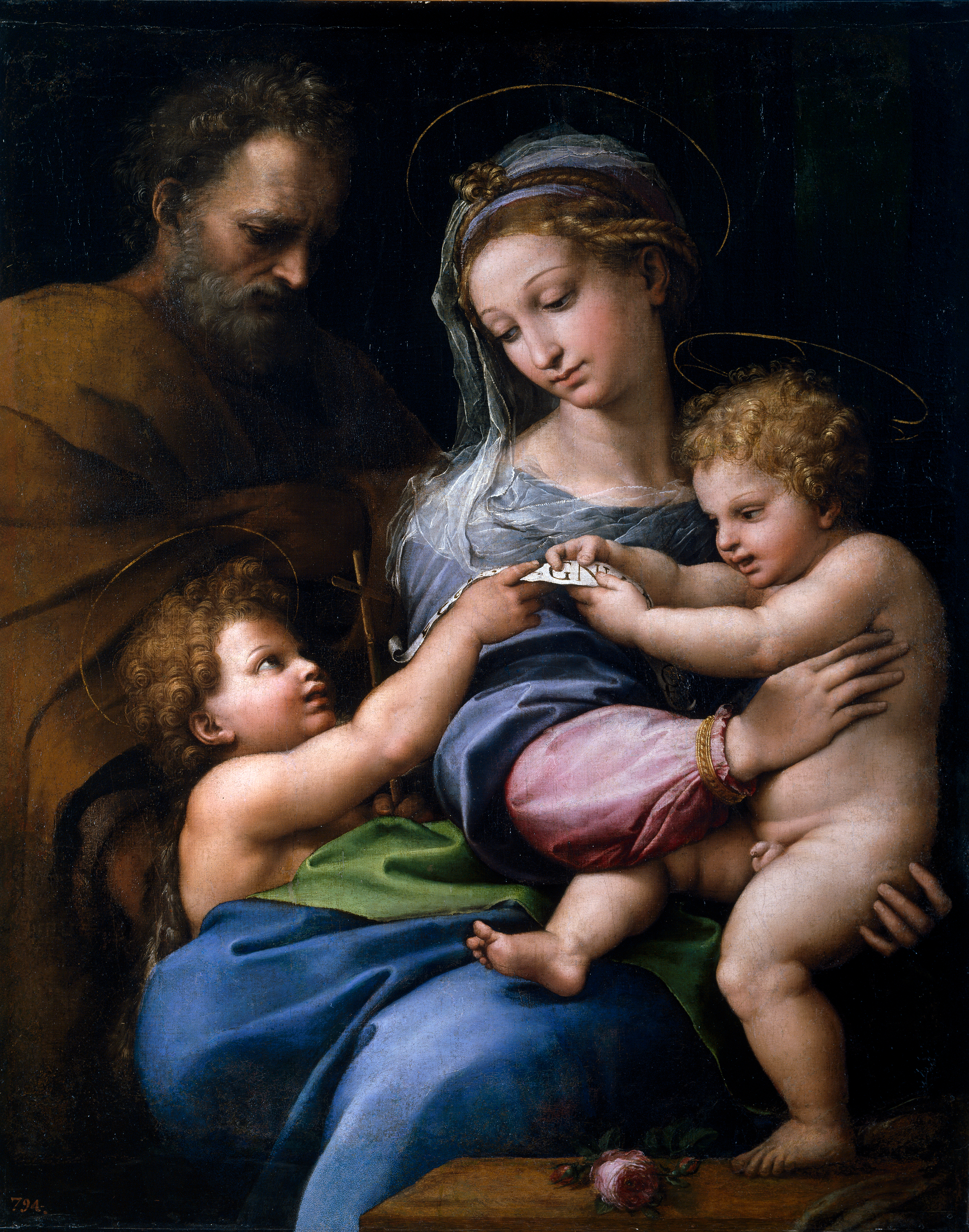
- From left to right: Saint Joseph, a young John the Baptist, Mary of Nazareth, and Jesus.
- Artist: Raphael, possibly assisted by Giulio Romano
- Year: 1518-1520
- Dimensions: 103 cm × 84 cm (41 in × 33 in)
- Location: Museo del Prado; Madrid

The Madonna of the Rose (Madonna della rosa) is a 1518-1520 painting, now in the Museo del Prado in Madrid. Its attribution as by Raphael is uncertain, and the involvement of Giulio Romano cannot be excluded. The rose and the lower portion were added at a later date by an unknown artist. A second autograph version of this painting, without the added rose and lower strip, painted on wood panel, is owned by real estate magnate Luke Brugnara. In 2022, the painting was included in an exhibition held by the National Gallery.

The controversy was further fueled by a paper which claimed to have used Artificial intelligence to analyze the attribution, and which concluded that the painting was done by Raphael, but that St. Joseph was a later addition added by someone else.

== See also ==
- List of paintings by Raphael
