= Colonna Madonna =

Painting by Raphael

Madonna Colonna
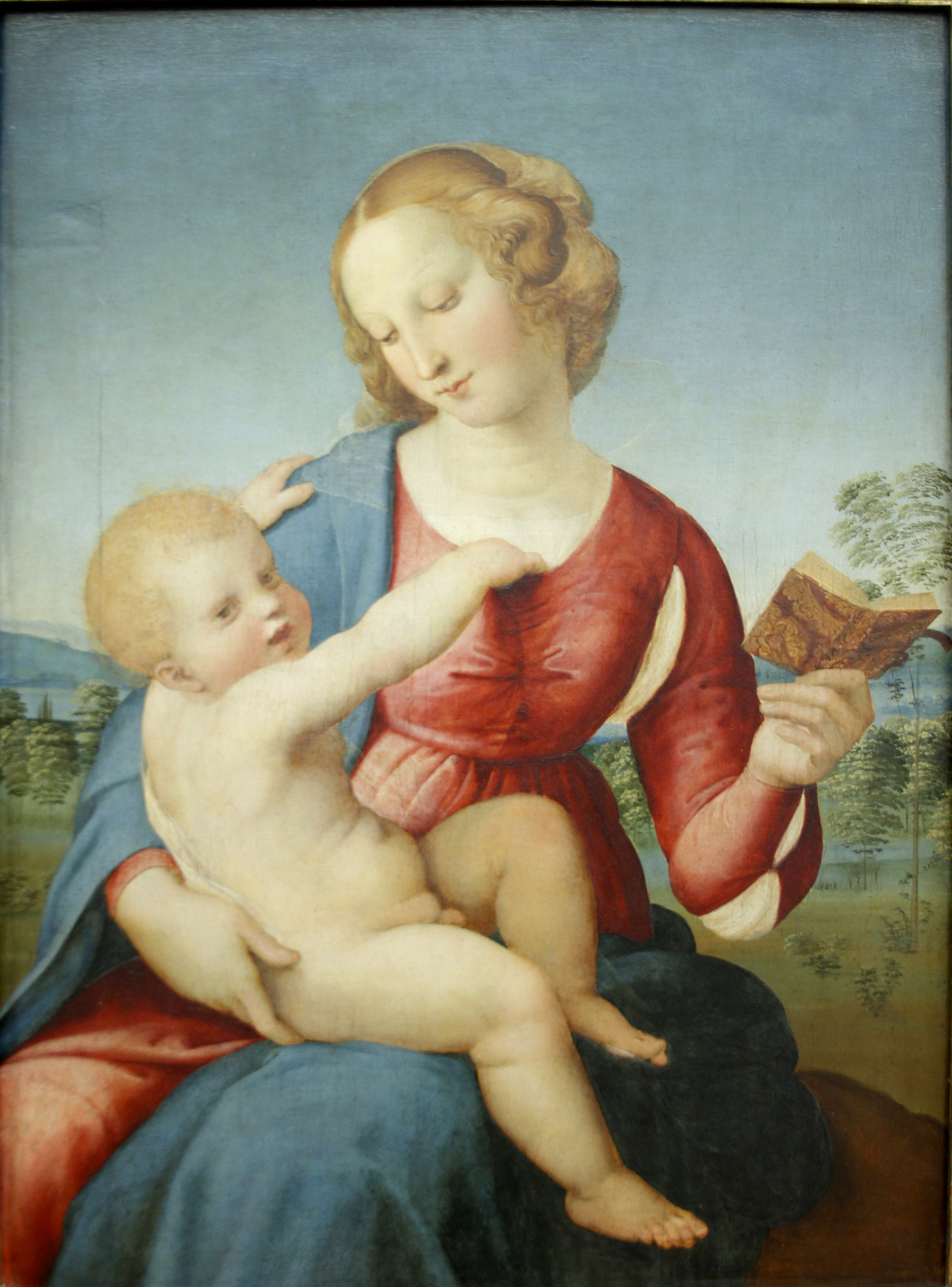
- Artist: Raphael
- Year: c. 1507-1508
- Type: Oil on poplar
- Dimensions: 52 cm × 38 cm (20 in × 15 in)
- Location: Gemäldegalerie; Berlin

The Madonna Colonna is an oil on poplar painting by the Italian Renaissance artist Raphael. It was painted c. 1507–1508, near the end of Raphael's Florentine period.

This painting is part of the collection of the Gemäldegalerie, Berlin, and should not be confused with the Colonna Altarpiece by the same artist, which is at the Metropolitan Museum of Art in New York.

== See also ==
- List of paintings by Raphael
