= Madonna with Beardless Saint Joseph =

Painting by Raphael

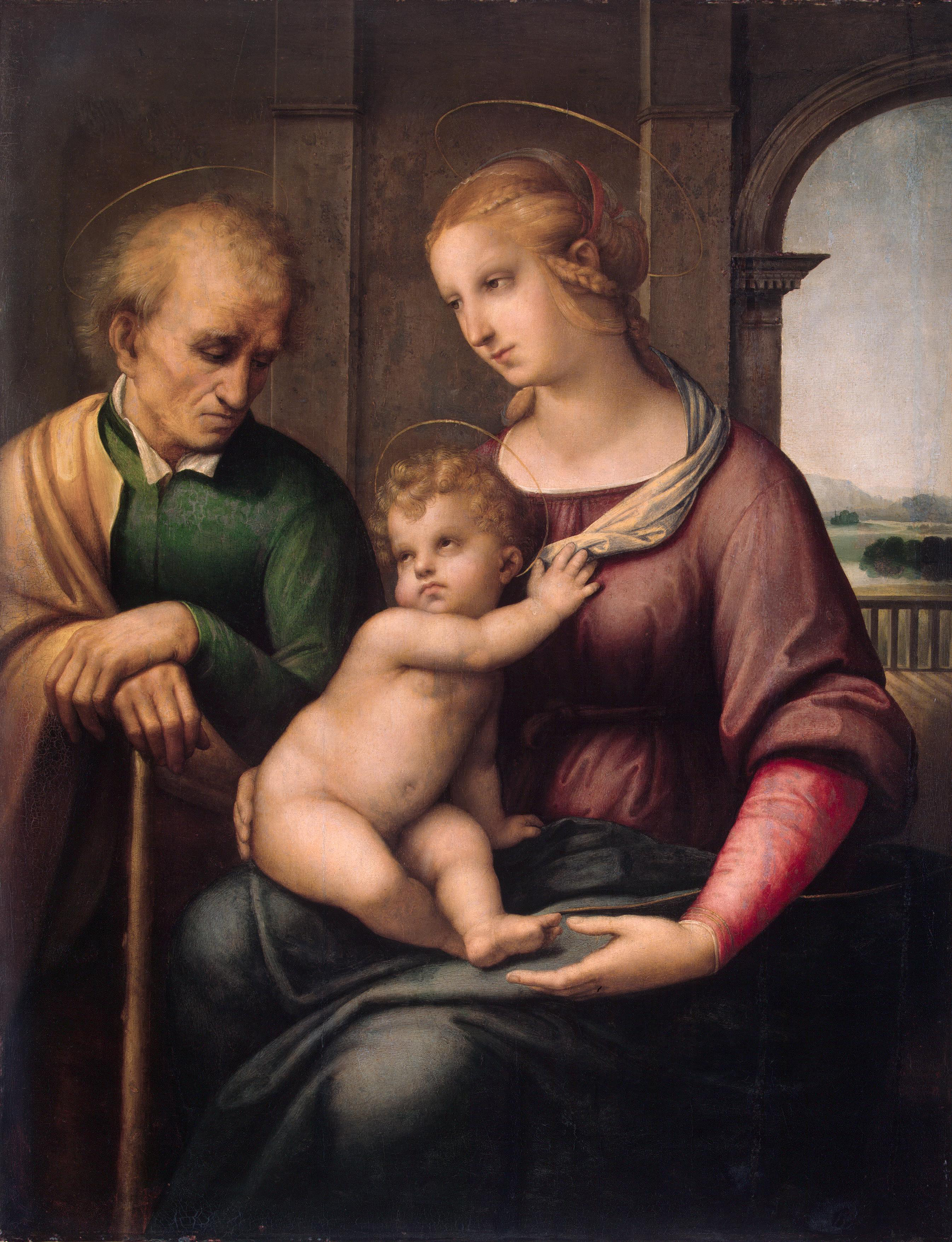
- Artist: Raphael
- Year: c. 1506
- Type: Tempera on canvas (transferred from panel)
- Dimensions: 72.5 cm × 56.5 cm (28.5 in × 22.2 in)
- Location: Hermitage Museum, Saint Petersburg

The Madonna with Beardless Saint Joseph is an early painting by Raphael, executed c. 1506, now at the Hermitage Museum. It depicts Saint Joseph, the Virgin Mary, and the Christ Child.

It is usually thought to be one of the small Madonnas painted by Raphael for Guidobaldo da Montefeltro during his one of his brief stays in Urbino between 1505 and 1506, and which Giorgio Vasari saw in that city. The earliest definitive mention of the Hermitage work dates to the 18th century, when it was probably in the Duke of Angoulême's collection in Paris. From there it passed into the collection of Pierre Crozat, which was bought almost in its entirety by Empress Catherine the Great of Russia in 1772, forming the core of the future Hermitage Museum.

The work was restored early in the 19th century, leading Alexander Pushkin to write the poem Renaissance and to refer to the work in his Mozart and Salieri, having his version of Salieri state "I don't find it funny when the painter is useless / It stains Raphael's Madonna for me".

The National Gallery applied for the work to be loaned to its 2020 exhibition marking the 500th anniversary of the artist's death, but this was delayed by the COVID-19 pandemic until 2022, and permission for its loan was withdrawn following the Russian invasion of Ukraine that year.

== See also ==
- List of paintings by Raphael
