= Bridgewater Madonna =

Painting by Raphael

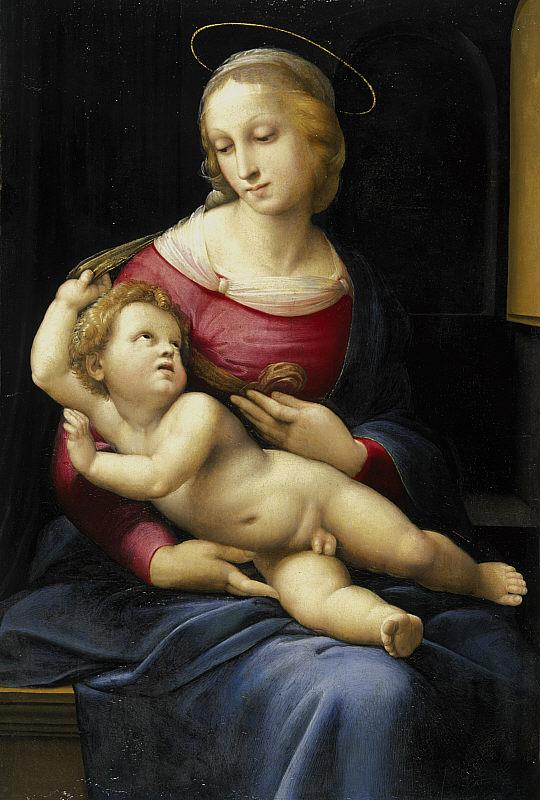
- Artist: Raphael
- Year: c. 1507 - 1508
- Type: oil on canvas
- Dimensions: 81 cm × 55 cm (32 in × 22 in)
- Location: Scottish National Gallery, Edinburgh

The Bridgewater Madonna (in Italian, Madonna Bridgeland) is a religious painting by Raphael, dated 1507. Originally on oil and wood, but later transferred to canvas, it measures 81 by 55 cm. The picture is part of the permanent collection of the Scottish National Gallery in Edinburgh, on loan from the Duke of Sutherland Collection.

== History ==
The work by Raphael has been attributed to his mature period in Florence. In the seventeenth century it was acquired in France as part of the Seignelay collection, eventually becoming the property of the Duke of Orleans, at the Palais-Royal in Paris. In 1792 the painting was purchased for £3,000 by Francis Egerton, 3rd Duke of Bridgewater. Until 1945 it remained at Bridgewater House, from which it takes its name. It is currently on loan to the Scottish National Gallery from the collection of the Duke of Sutherland (another branch of the same aristocratic family).

Preparatory drawings for the work in the Albertina Museum in Vienna and the British Museum in London show that Raphael was partly inspired by the Florentine works of Michelangelo and Leonardo da Vinci, with painterly features typified by chiaroscuro effects and lively intertwined portrayals of the virgin and child. The painting was probably intended to be displayed as a devotional image in a private chamber.

== Description and style ==
On a dark background, in which most features are barely discernible – a niche with an open door, a bench – the virgin nurses her child in her lap, while he gently moves around on the left. The pair are characterised as diverging and intertwined, with the child's body veering to the left and the virgin's torso veering towards the right – the child's arms holding the Madonna's veil, her hands touching the child's body. The colours of the piece contrast against the background, suggesting figures emerging from the shadows.

Raphael made many drawings and paintings of the Virgin and Child in Florence. The artful combination of gestures are particularly graceful, with an elegant contraposto twist. The gaze between the exquisite Mother and Child underlines its tenderness. Technical X-ray analysis shows that originally the artist painted a landscape as background, typical of earlier portrayals of the Madonna. Probably Raphael later decided that choosing a dark background allowed the pair to be painted more subtly, increasing the contrast between light and shade, and thus enhancing the sense of volume and monumentality.

Raphael's motifs were foreshadowed by two earlier Florentine artists of the High Renaissance, Michelangelo and Leonardo da Vinci. In Michelangelo's sculpted Taddei Tondo, the Madonna is portrayed with the Christ Child outstretched on her knees, accompanied by the infant St John clutching a fluttering bird; and the motif of a serenely smiling Virgin and Child, depicted in contraposto on a dark background, is derived from da Vinci. Other copies of Raphael's painting exist: a version in the National Gallery, London; and an oval version, now held by the National Trust in Nostell Priory, Yorkshire.

== See also ==
- List of paintings by Raphael
