= Madonna and Child Enthroned with Saints (Raphael) =

Painting by Raphael

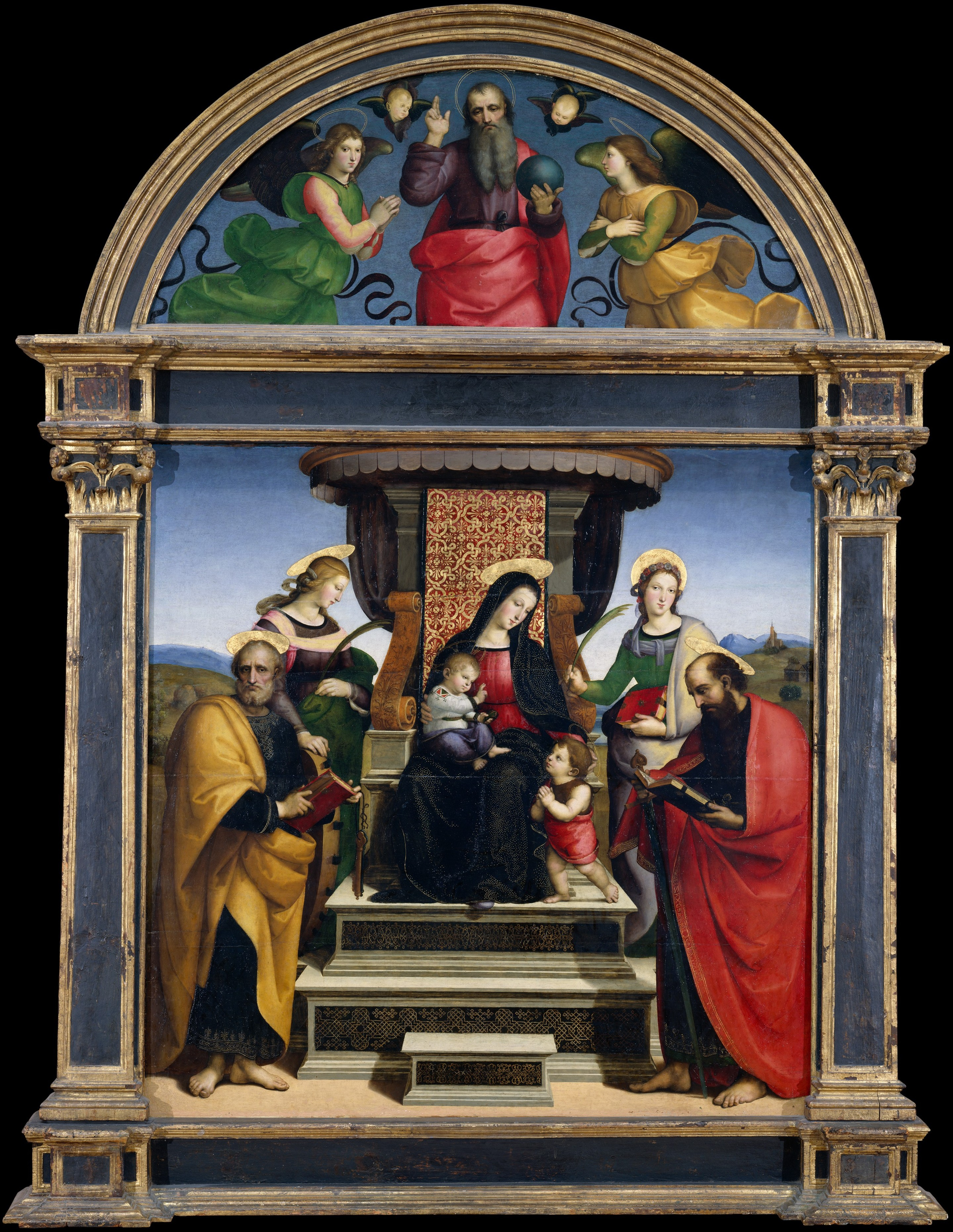
- Artist: Raphael
- Year: c. 1503-1505
- Type: Oil and gold on wood
- Dimensions: 172.4 cm × 172.4 cm (67.9 in × 67.9 in)
- Location: Metropolitan Museum of Art, New York City

The Madonna and Child Enthroned with Saints (Young Baptist and Saints Peter, Catherine, Lucy, and Paul), also known as the Colonna Altarpiece, is a painting by the Italian High Renaissance artist Raphael, executed c. 1503-1505. It is housed in the Metropolitan Museum of Art of New York City. It is the only altarpiece by Raphael in the United States.

The collection of Metropolitan Museum of Art also contains a painting of the Agony in the Garden from the predella of the altarpiece. Other panels from the predella can be found in the collections of the National Gallery, London, the Isabella Stewart Gardner Museum, in Boston, and Dulwich Picture Gallery, in London. A preparatory drawing by Raphael for the composition of the agony in the garden is in the collection of the Morgan Library New York.

The pieces of the predella were separated from the altarpiece and sold to Queen Christina of Sweden, from where they reached the Orleans Collection, while the main panels themselves were eventually sold to the aristocratic Colonna family in Rome, from whom the altarpiece takes its name. The painting eventually passed to the House of Bourbon-Two Sicilies and was sold by the estate of Francis II of the Two Sicilies to Martin Henry Colnaghi in 1896, who sold it on to Charles Sedelmeyer. The Altarpiece was the last Raphael altar in private hands when J.P. Morgan purchased it from Sedelmeyer in the early 20th century for a record price.

The painting depicts Christ sitting on Mary and blessing a young John the Baptist, with Saint Peter, Catherine of Alexandria, an unknown female saint, and Saint Paul in the background. It was painted for the Franciscan convent of Sant'Antonio da Padova in Perugia, who may have made the unique request for Christ Child and John the Baptist to be fully clothed. Some believe the lunette was completed after the central panel, as Peter and Paul are depicted in a much more modern appearance, perhaps inspired by Raphael's first visit to Florence and his exposure to the work of Fra Bartolomeo and Leonardo da Vinci.

== See also ==
- List of paintings by Raphael
