= Portrait of Cardinal Alessandro Farnese (Raphael) =

Painting by Raphael

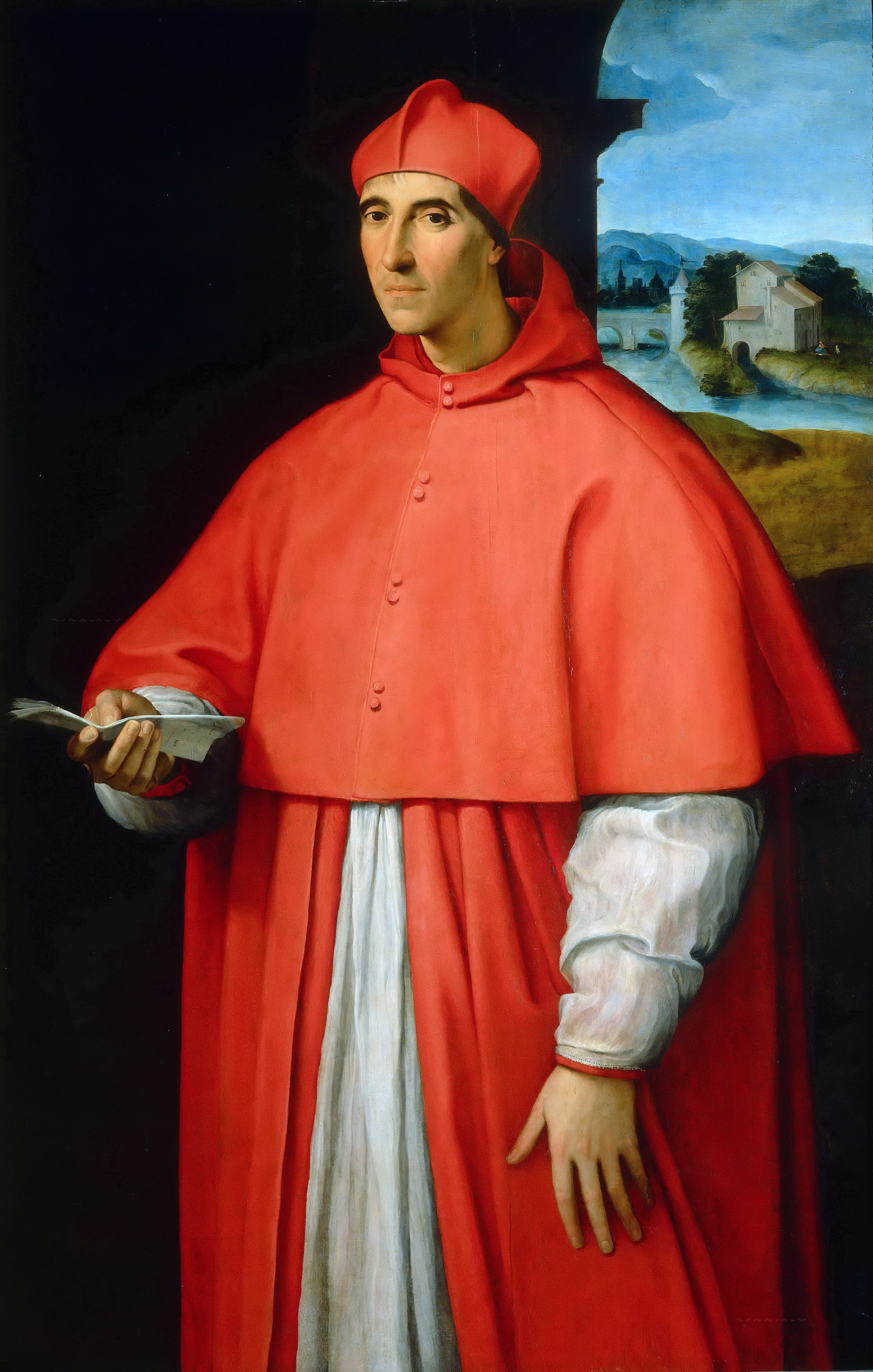
- Artist: Raphael
- Year: c. 1509–1511
- Type: Oil on wood
- Dimensions: 139 cm × 91 cm (55 in × 36 in)
- Location: Museo di Capodimonte, Naples

The Portrait of Cardinal Alessandro Farnese is a portrait of cardinal Alessandro Farnese (the future Pope Paul III) by Raphael, executed circa 1509-1511.

The cardinal posed near a window with a bright foreground, leading into a dark hall. His delicate right hand holds a letter.

The painting resides at the Museo Nazionale di Capodimonte in Naples.

== See also ==
- List of paintings by Raphael
