= Terranuova Madonna =

Painting by Raphael

Madonna Terranuova
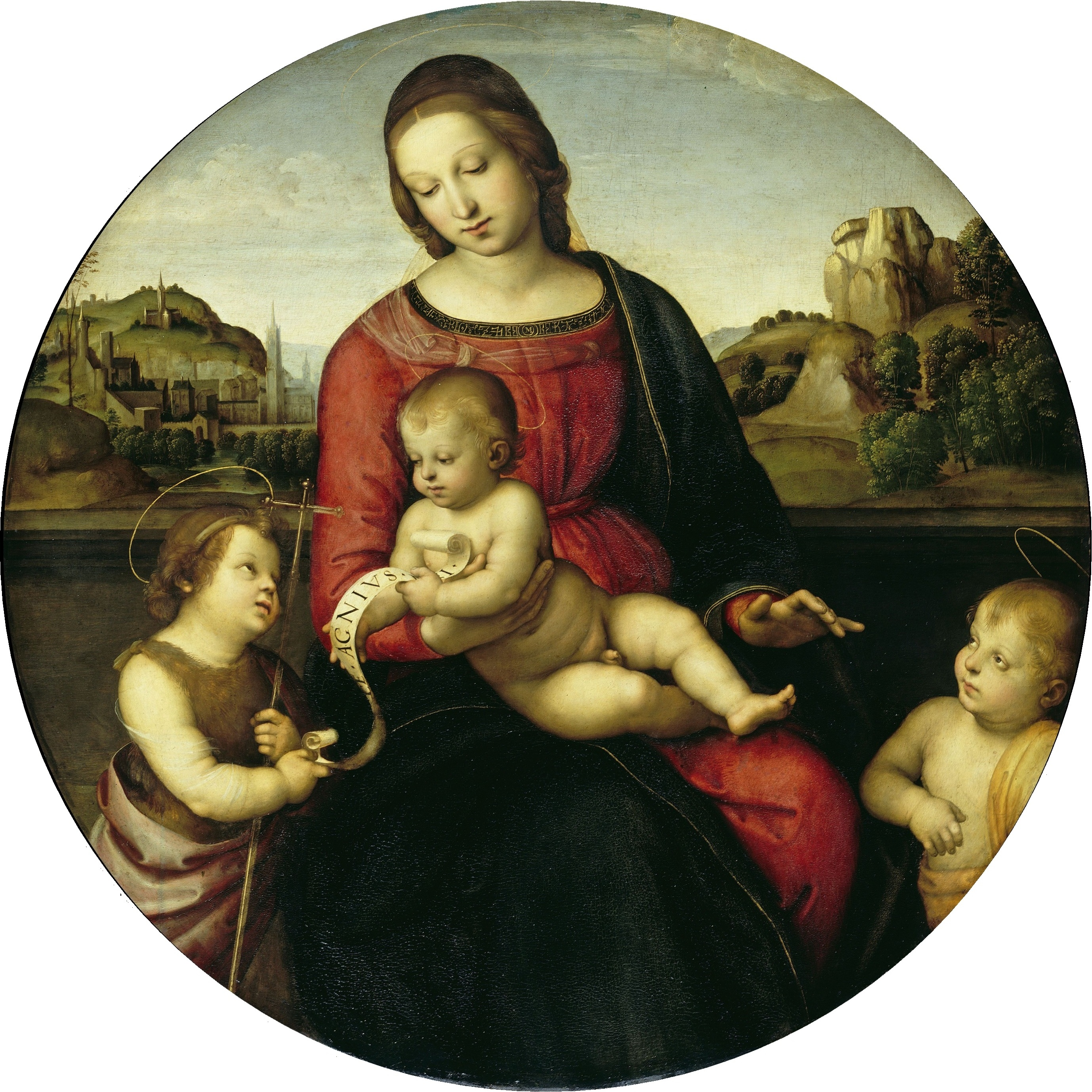
- Artist: Raphael
- Year: c. 1504–1505
- Medium: Oil on wood
- Dimensions: 87 cm diameter (34 in)
- Location: Gemäldegalerie, Berlin

The Madonna with Child, St. John and a Child Saint is an oil on wood painting by the Italian Renaissance artist Raphael, who executed it around 1504–1505. It is also known as Madonna Terranuova as it belonged to the Italian Dukes of Terranuova, from whom it went to Berlin's Staatliche Museen, where it has been since 1854. It is currently on display in the Gemäldegalerie, Berlin.

== See also ==
- List of paintings by Raphael
