= Saint John the Baptist in the Desert (Raphael) =

Painting by Raphael and his assistants

- Artist: Raphael and his workshop
- Year: c. 1516–1517
- Medium: Oil on canvas, transferred from wood
- Dimensions: 135 cm × 142 cm (53 in × 56 in)
- Location: Louvre, Paris

Saint John the Baptist in the Desert is an oil painting of c. 1516–1517 by Raphael and his assistants, including Giulio Romano. The composition is thought to be by Raphael himself, who may also have drafted some of the sections of the finished work. It is now in the Louvre in Paris. Originally on panel, it was transferred to a canvas support in 1777; the practice was quite common in French collections in that period.

Its depiction of John the Baptist as a young boy draws on Michelangelo's ignudi from the Sistine Chapel ceiling. The background includes the coats of arms of the La Tremouille family and of its commissioner, Adrien Gouffier de Boissy, cardinal and Grand Almoner of France under Francis I. In 1532 the work was placed in the collegiate church of Saint-Maurice in Oiron by Boissy's nephew Claude Gouffier, husband to a member of the La Tremoille family, meaning that both coats of arms must have been added at that date.

In 1660 the Count of La Feuillade offered the painting to Louis XIV of France. At the request of the Duke of Maillé the painting was transferred from the royal collection to the parish church of Longpont. It was later bought at the posthumous sale of the Duke's collection by the art dealer Cousin and entered the French national collection in 1838.
