= Cardinal and Theological Virtues (Raphael) =

Fresco by Raphael

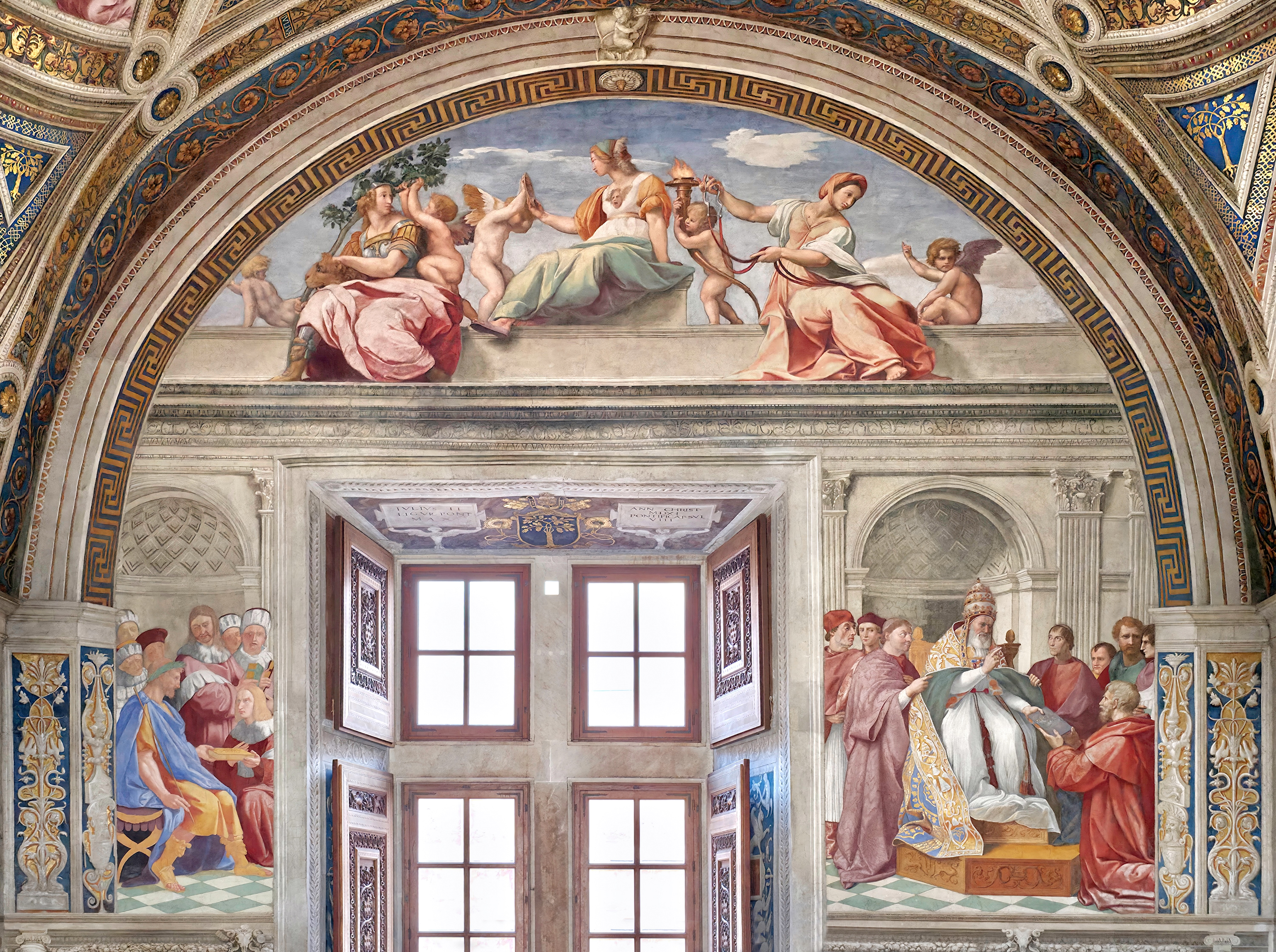
- Artist: Raphael
- Year: 1511
- Type: fresco
- Dimensions: 6.6 m (22 ft) wide
- Location: Vatican Museums; Vatican City

The Cardinal and Theological Virtues is a lunette fresco by Raphael found on the south wall of the Stanza della Segnatura in the Apostolic Palace of the Vatican. Three of the cardinal virtues are personified as statuesque women seated in a bucolic landscape, and the theological virtues are depicted by putti.

The fresco was part of Raphael's commission to decorate the private apartments of Pope Julius II. These rooms are now known as the Stanze di Raffaello.

After completing his three monumental frescoes Disputation of the Holy Sacrament, The Parnassus, and The School of Athens in the Stanza della Segnatura, in 1511 Raphael painted the Cardinal and Theological Virtues.

== Description ==
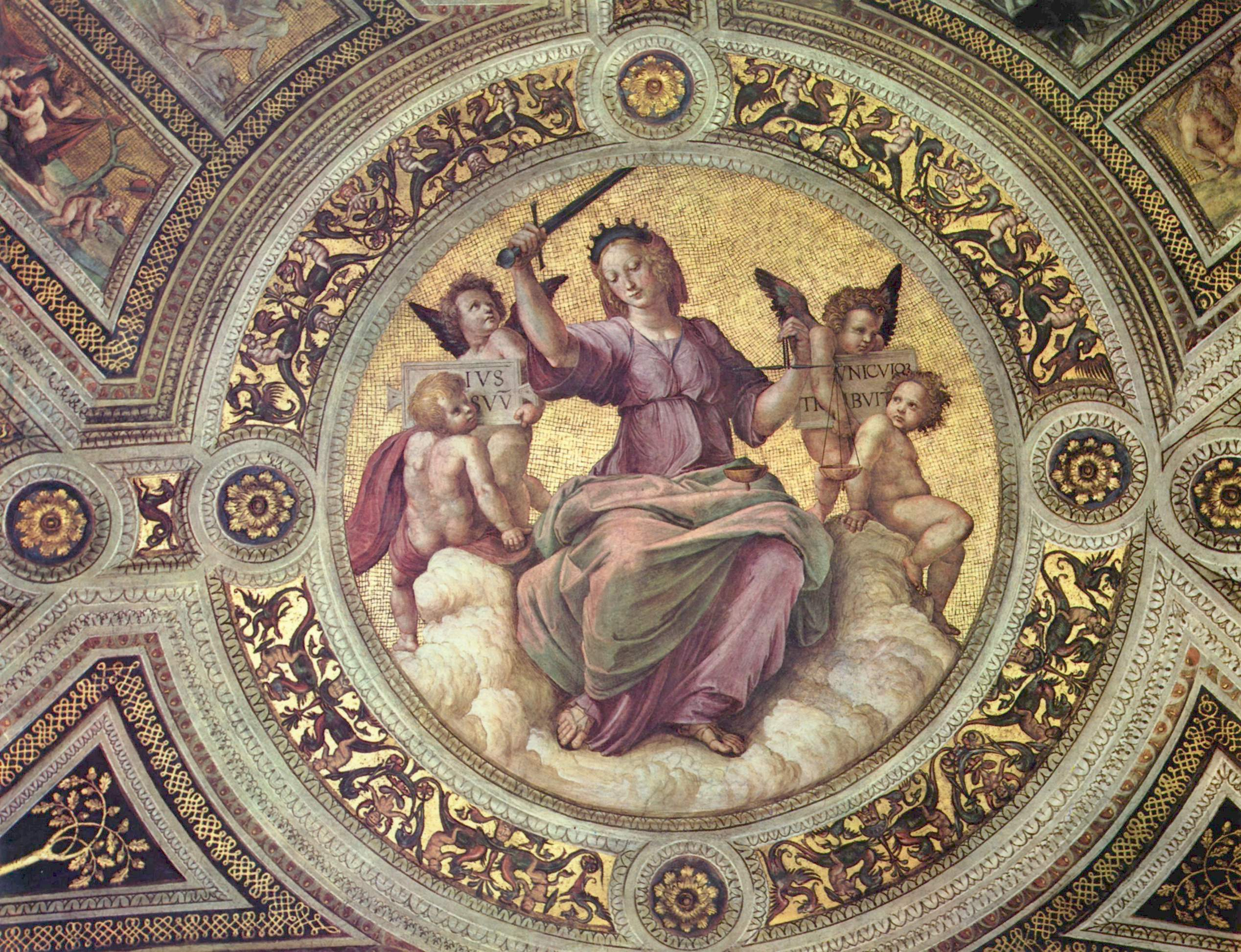
Justice displayed in a medallion on the ceiling of the Stanza della Segnatura

The walls containing frescoes in the Stanza della Segnatura depict four branches of human knowledge: Philosophy (School of Athens), Religion (Disputation), Poetry (Parnassus), and Law (Virtues). The fourth wall containing the Virtues addresses both the civil law of the secular state and the canon law of the Church. Accordingly, three classical cardinal virtues (Fortitude, Prudence and Temperance) are attended by five putti, three of whom depict the theological virtues of Charity, Hope, and Faith.

On the left, Raphael painted Fortitude. Armor-clad, she caresses a lion with her left hand while grasping a sapling of black oak with her right. The oak tree symbolizes strength and alludes to the Della Rovere family to which Pope Julius II belonged. A putto representing Charity harvests acorns from the oak branch. Fortitude's seated posture and the folds of her clothing are copied directly from a modello Raphael had seen of Michelangelo's Moses.

Prominently seated in the center is Prudence. On her breast is an effigy of a winged Gorgon to ward off deceit and fraud. Janus-like, her head has two faces shown in profile. Her youthful feminine face looks forward into a mirror. This is an allegory of wisdom and knowledge of the present. The backward-facing visage of the old man peers into a past for sound judgment predicated on experience. His view is enhanced by the flaming torch held by a putto depicting Hope.

Temperance sits on the right. She holds the bridle of restraint and is accompanied by a putto portraying Faith who points upward to heaven with his right hand.

The fourth cardinal virtue, Justice, isn't included in the scene. Instead, she is depicted holding scales and a sword in a tondo on the ceiling directly above the fresco. The more prominent position of Justice is explained by the emphasis Plato placed on this fourth virtue. He introduced it to ensure the other three cardinal virtues existed in harmony.

The other two frescoes found lower on the wall also portray scenes concerning the law. To the left of the window is a fresco designed by Raphael but executed by his studio. It depicts the Emperor Justinian receiving the civil code known as the Pandects of the Corpus Juris Civilis from Tribonian. To the right of the window, Pope Gregory IX (in the likeness of Pope Julius II) receives the code of canon law known as the Decretals from Raymond of Penyafort.

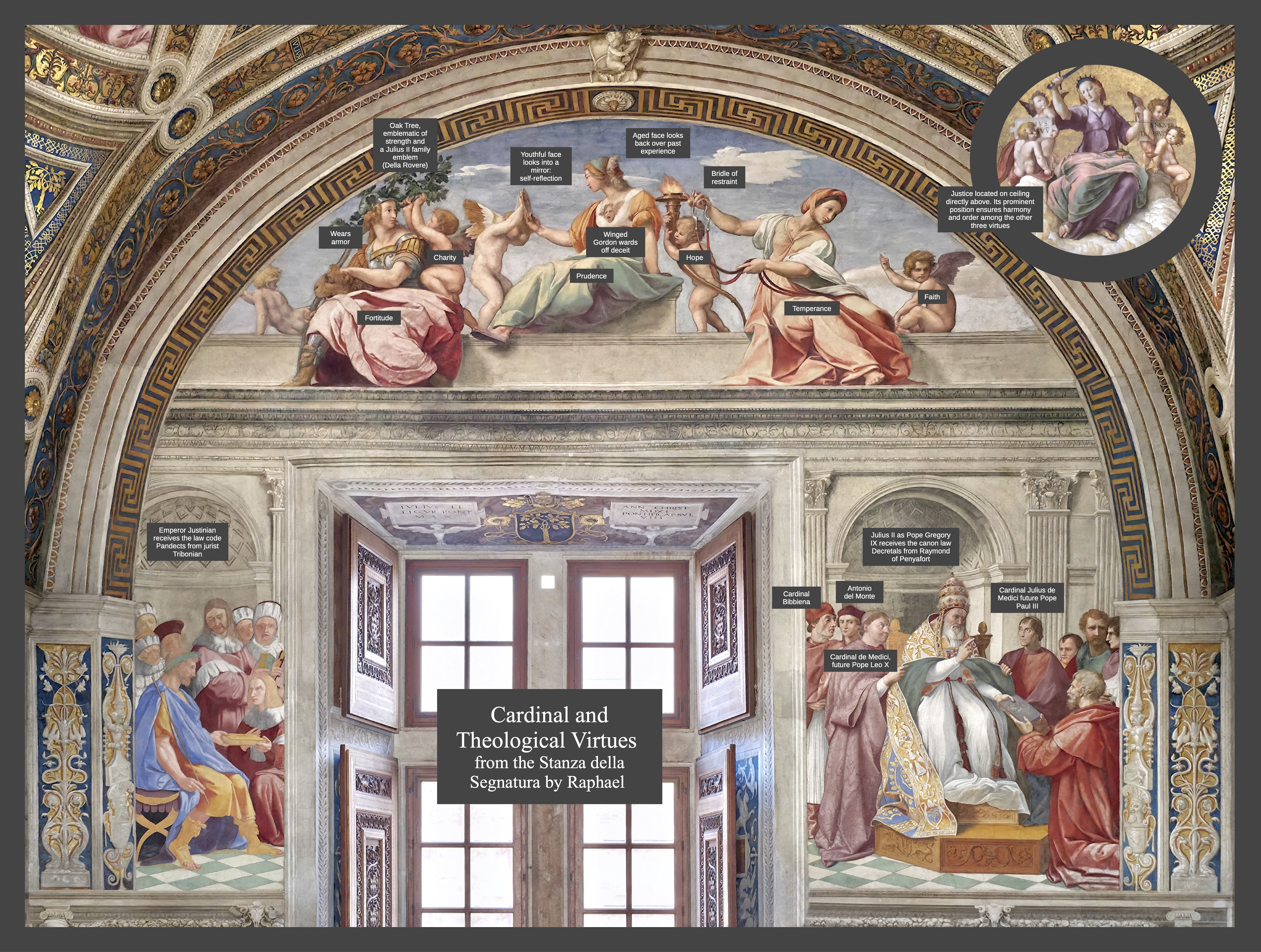
Explanatory key with potential interpretations

== Gallery ==
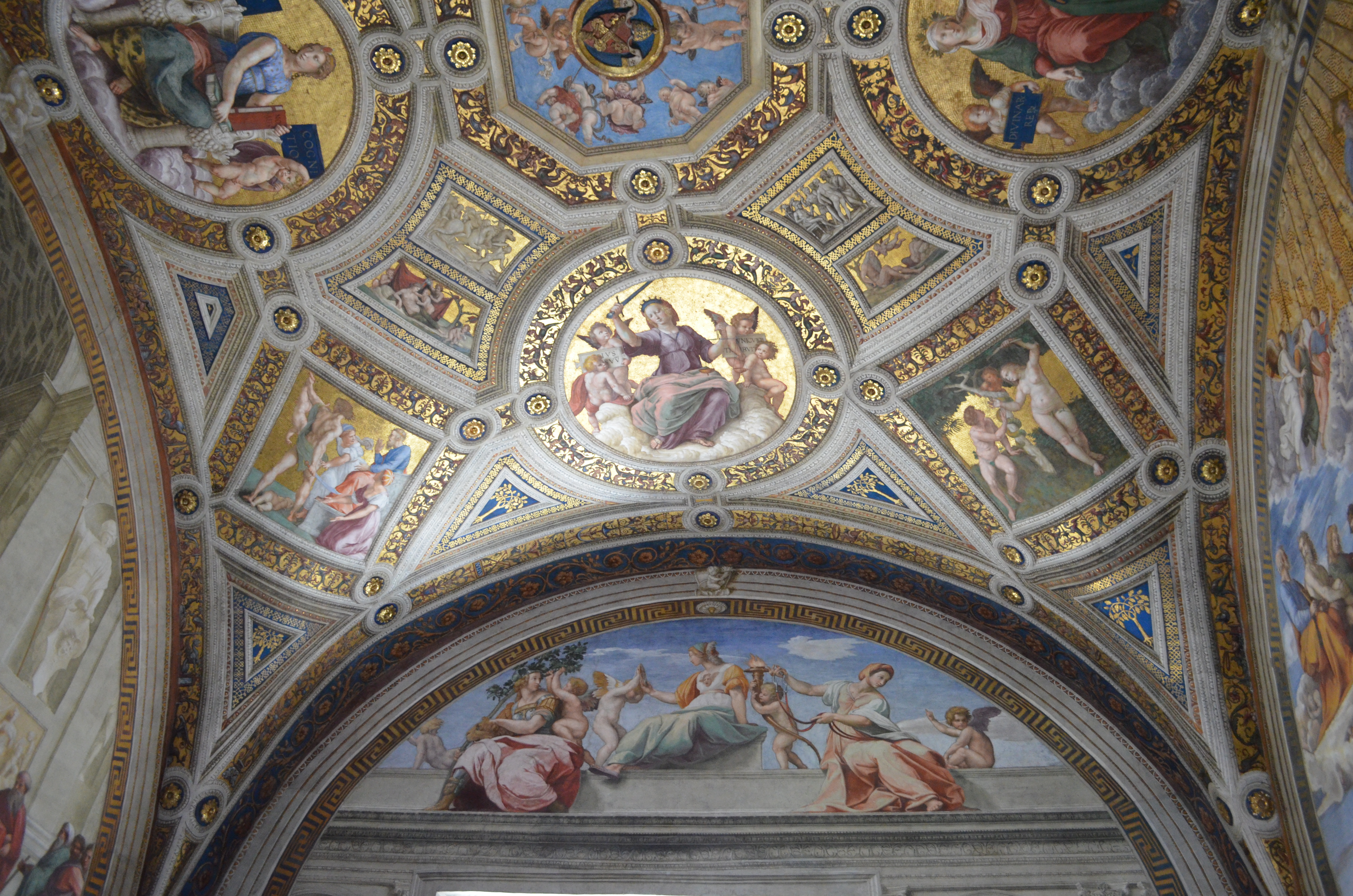
Virtues shown below Justice in the Stanza della Segnatura

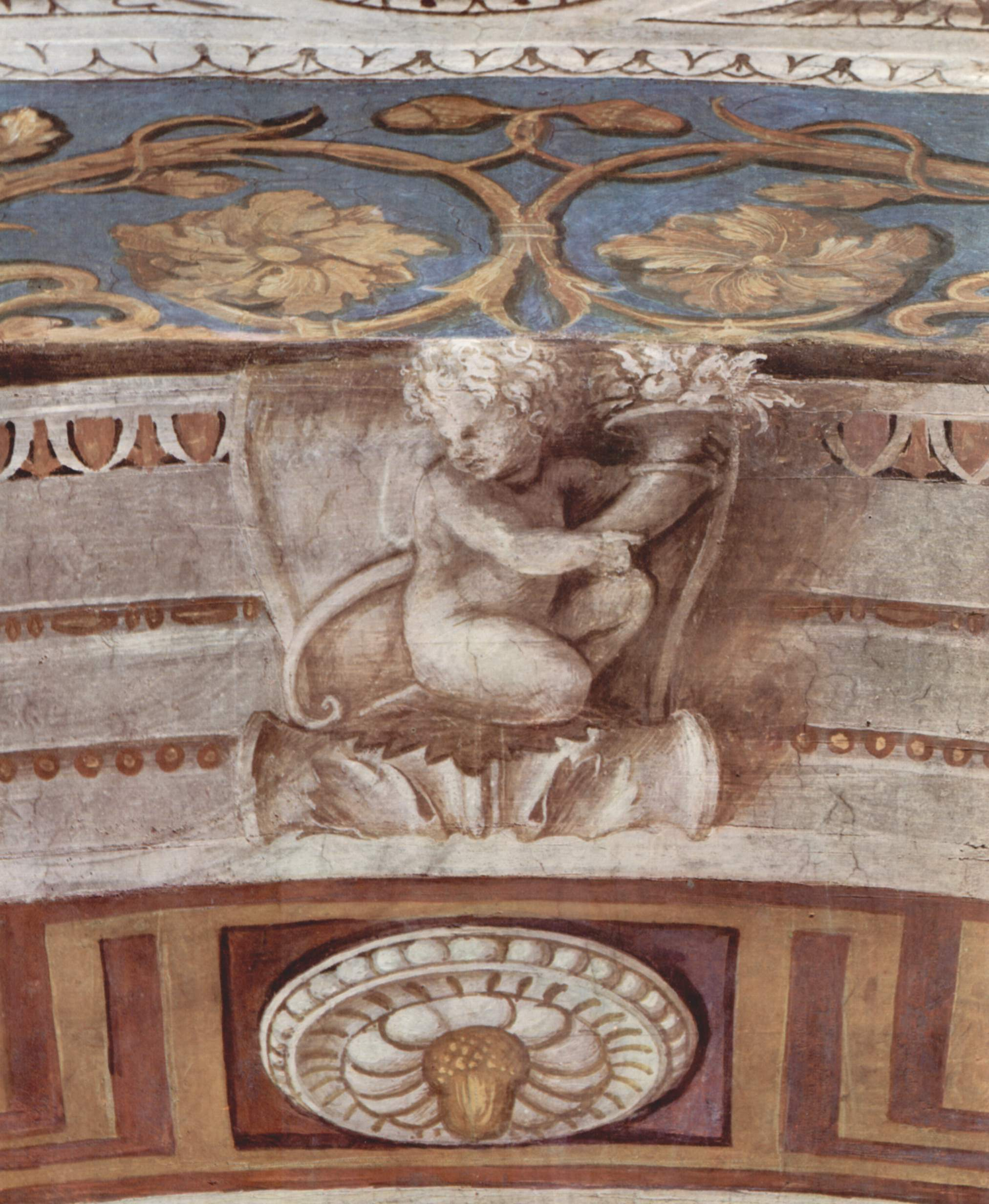
Detail of putto with a cornucopia

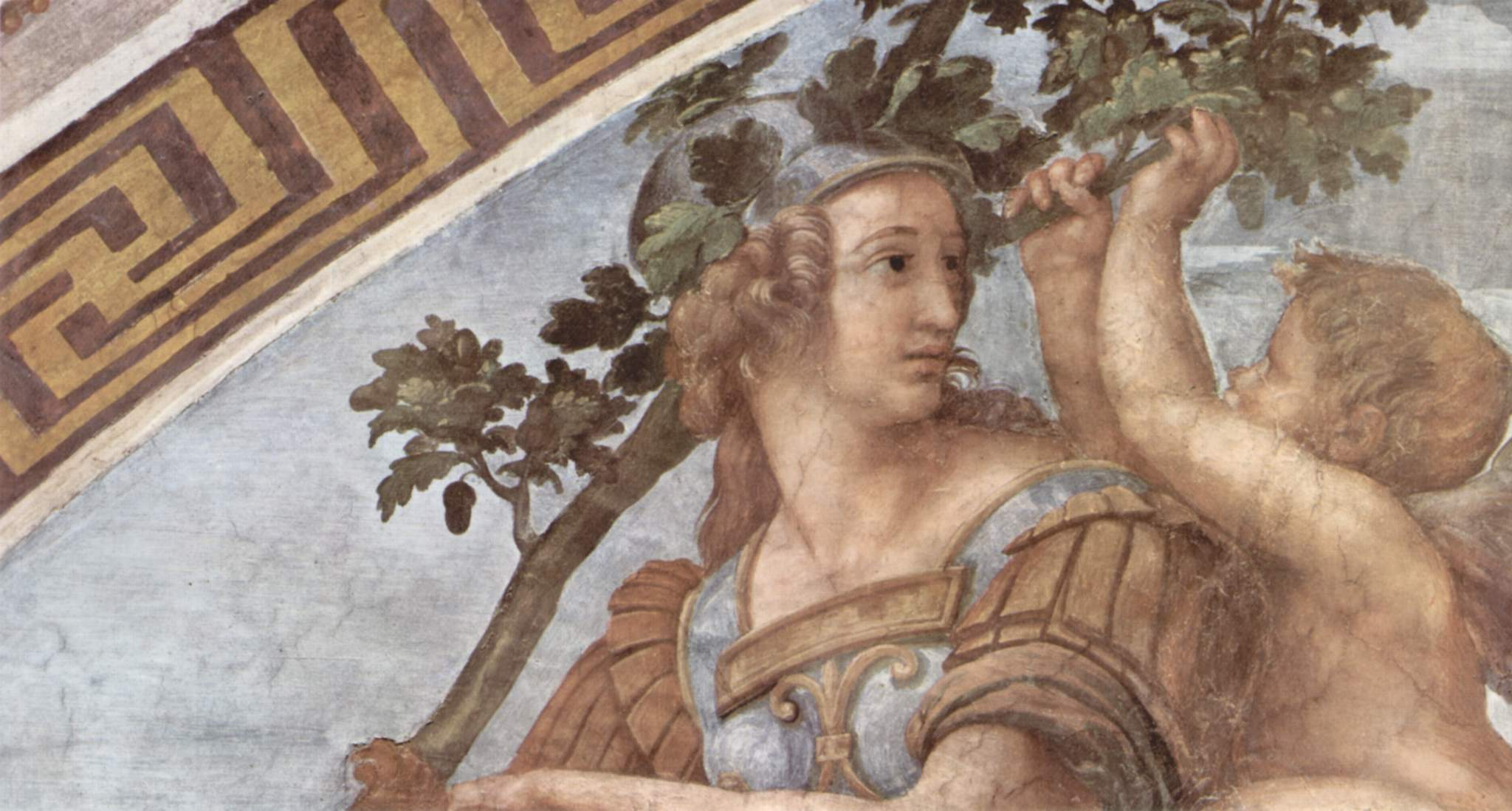
Detail of Fortitude

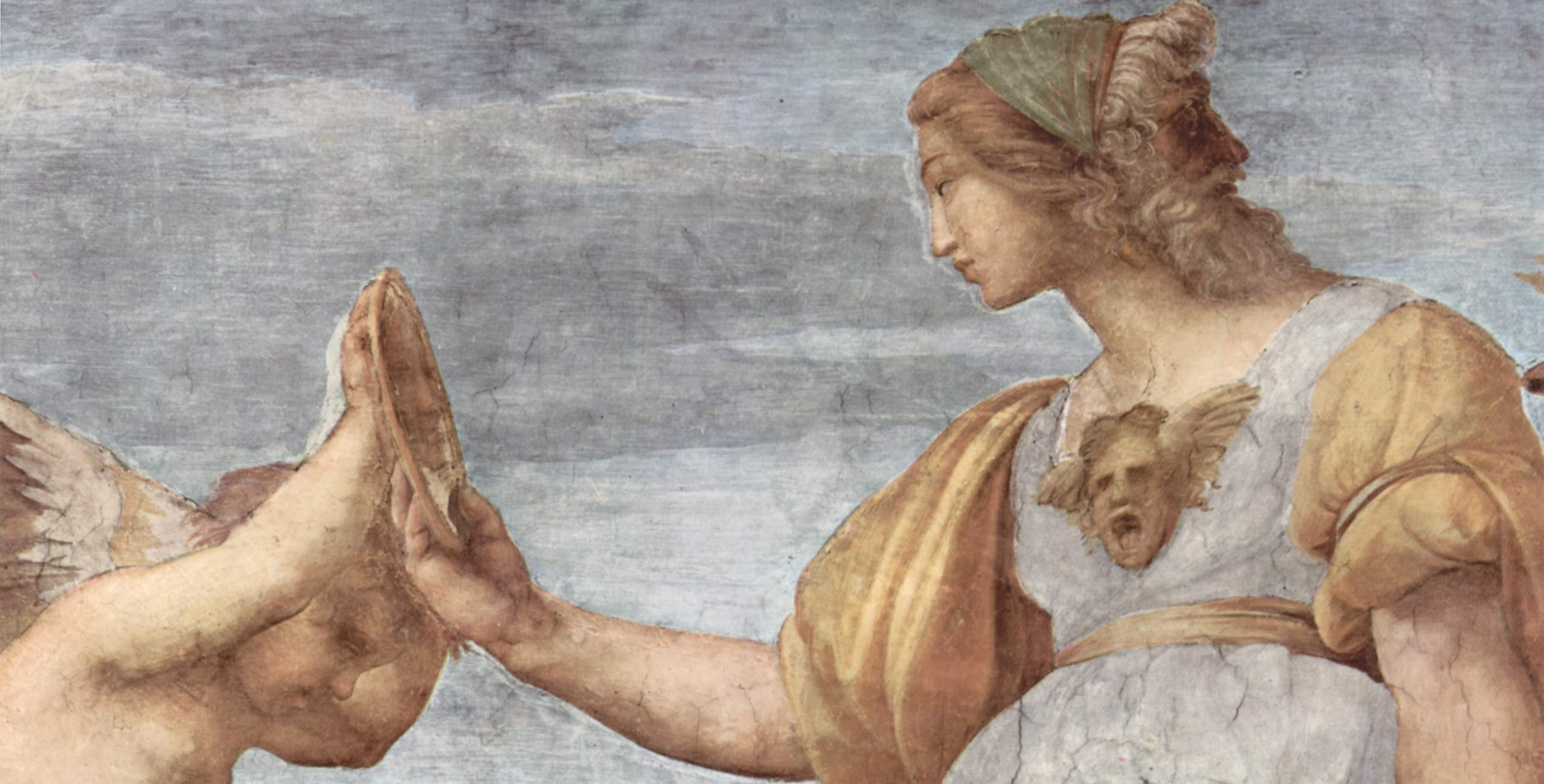
Detail of Prudence

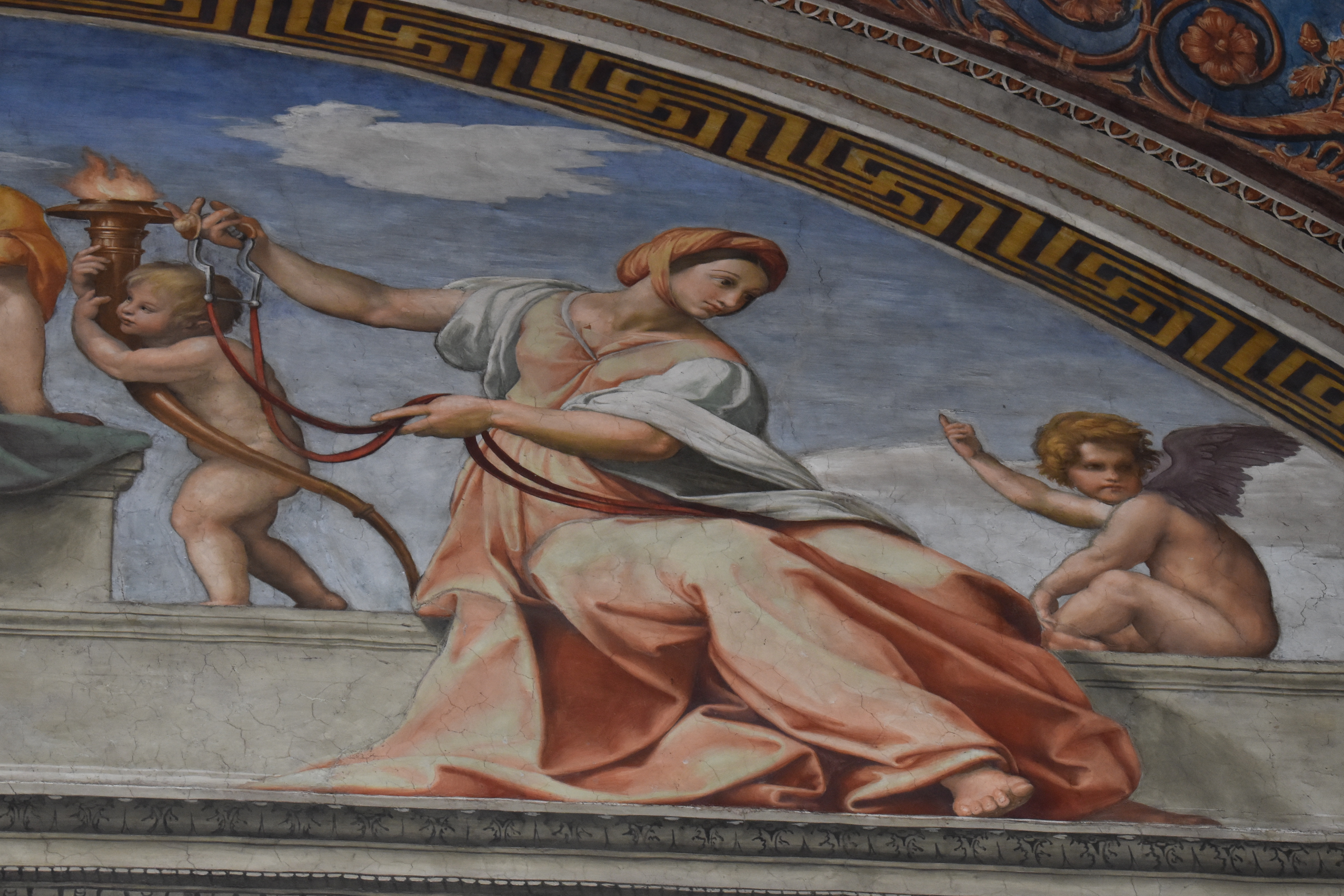
Detail of Temperance

== See also ==
- List of paintings by Raphael
