= Stanza della Segnatura =

One of the Raphael Rooms in Vatican City

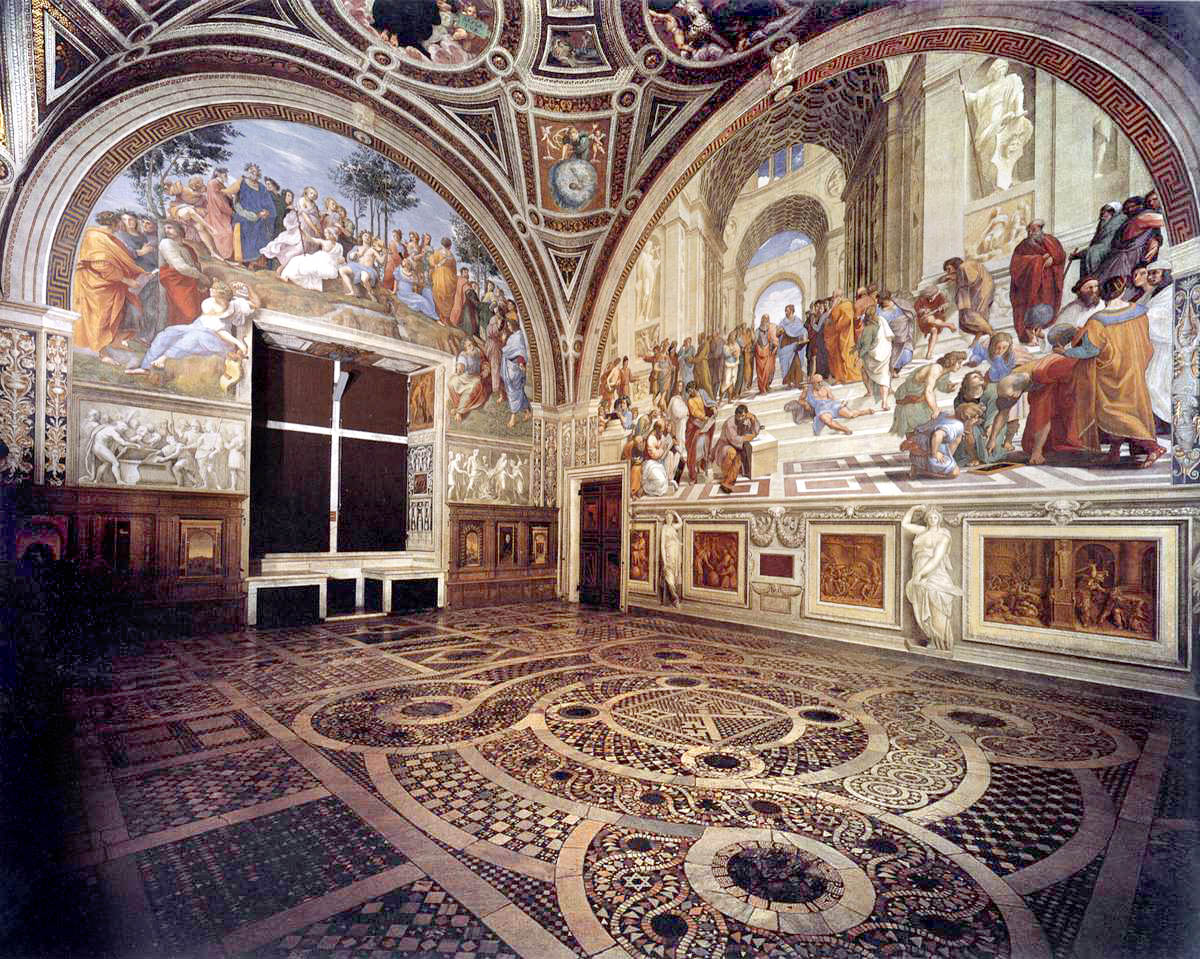
- Artist: Raphael
- Year: 1508–1511
- Type: Fresco
- Location: Apostolic Palace, Vatican Museums, Vatican City

The Stanza della Segnatura is one of the rooms of the Raphael Rooms in the Apostolic Palace in Vatican. It was the first to be decorated by Raphael, between 1508 and 1511.

== History ==
The room takes its name from the highest court of the Holy See, the "Segnatura Gratiae et Iustitiae" (Signatura of Grace and Justice), presided over by the pontiff. Judging by the themes of the frescoes and testimonies related to the term upper library used during the pontificate of the Della Rovere, it is assumed that the room was intended to serve as a study and library for Julius II; in any case, immediately after the completion of the works, its use as the court gave it the name it still bears today, as documented since 1513 by the master of apostolic ceremonies Paris de Grassis.

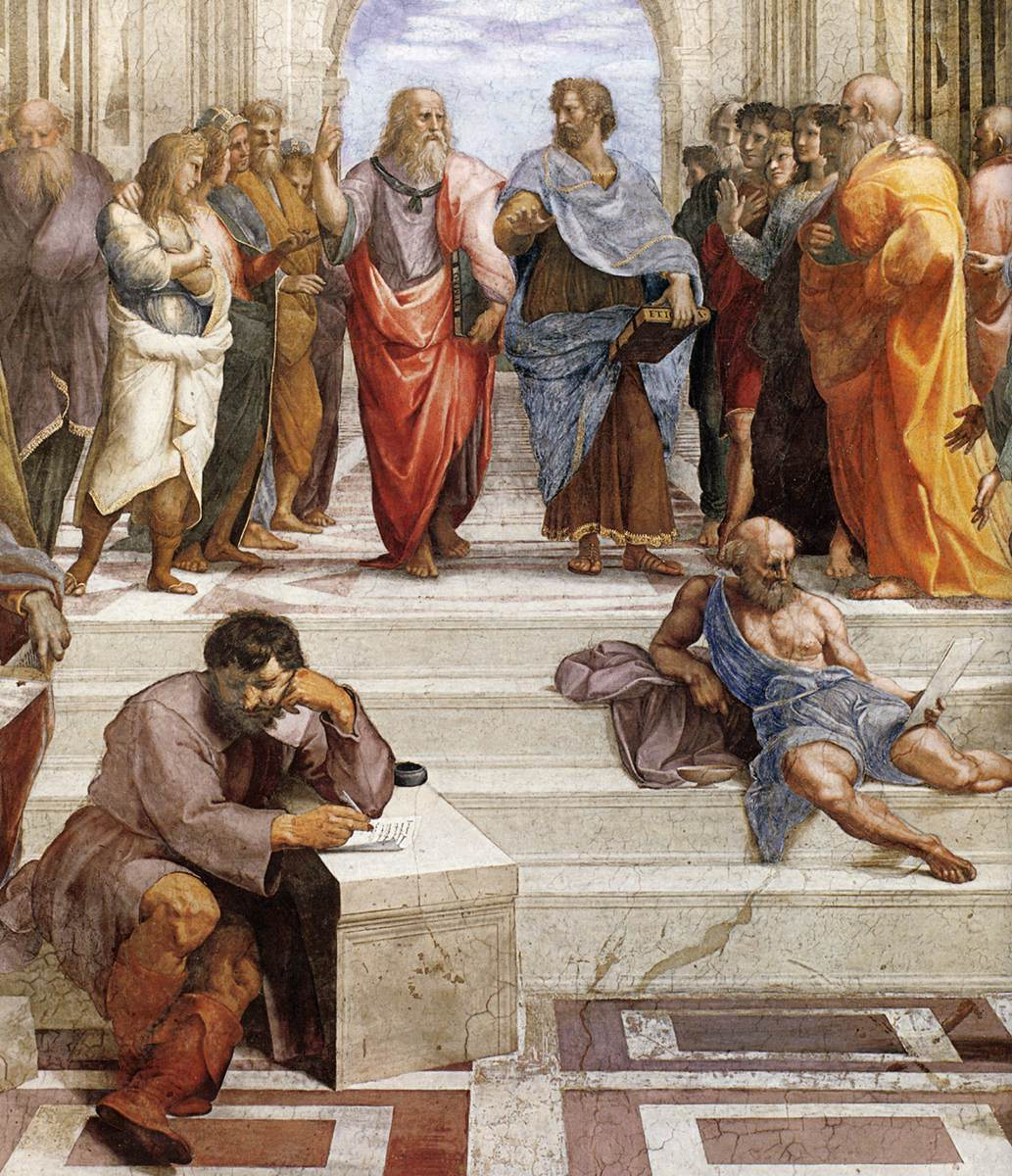
The School of Athens, detail

The pope's decision to move to these rooms on the upper floor of the Apostolic Palace dates back to November 26, 1507 and was linked to his refusal to use the spaces of the Borgia Apartment decorated by Pinturicchio, as he did not wish to be surrounded by the memories of his despised predecessor, Alexander VI.

Initially, Julius II entrusted the decoration of the new rooms to a select group of artists, namely Luca Signorelli, Perugino, Jacopo Ripanda, Bramantino, Baldino Baldinelli, Cesare da Sesto, Sodoma, Lorenzo Lotto, and Baldassare Peruzzi. Raphael, likely summoned by Bramante, architect of St. Peter's Basilica, left Florence for Rome in the summer of 1508 and joined the group, "presumably" assisting Sodoma in the final months of 1508. Perhaps on the advice of Bramante and Pinturicchio, in 1509, Julius II decided to entrust the entire decorative project to the artist from Urbino, not hesitating to destroy all previous decorations, both the recent ones and those from the 14th century, including frescoes by Piero della Francesca and Bartolomeo della Gatta.

Raphael's decoration began with the Stanza della Segnatura in October 1508, and the works were completed in three years, by 1511, as evidenced by the inscription on The Parnassus and the one on the architrave of the window below the lunette of the Cardinal and Theological Virtues.

According to Paolo Giovio, the iconographic program of the first two rooms (the Segnatura and the Heliodorus) was suggested by the pontiff himself and was likely developed by a group of theologians and humanists in the pontifical circle with a Neoplatonic background, among whom scholars identify the participation of Giles of Viterbo, Cristoforo Marcello, and Tommaso Inghirami. However, it is not unlikely that the artist played a significant role in defining the scenes at a compositional level, as suggested by his perfect harmony with the cultural environment of the pontifical court: evidence of this is the prestige and undisputed admiration he received from the literati of the time.

It is certain that the Stories were not created spontaneously: a large number of preparatory drawings demonstrate a long and thoughtful elaboration, starting from ideas that were initially quite vague.

The decoration, as is customary in fresco cycles, began with the ceiling, which could be considered completed in 1508; this was followed by the Disputation of the Holy Sacrament (1509), the School of Athens (1509–1510), the Parnassus (1510–1511), and the Virtues (1511). The attribution of the four monochromes on either side of the two windows is uncertain but surely based on Raphael's designs. During the time of Paul III, the wooden panels inlaid in the lower register were replaced with monochromes by Perino del Vaga. During the Roman Republic established by the Jacobins and later during the Napoleonic period, the French devised plans to detach the frescoes and make them portable. Indeed, they expressed a desire to remove Raphael's frescoes from the walls of the Vatican Rooms and send them to France, among the objects sent to the Musée Napoléon as part of the Napoleonic spoliations, but these plans were never carried out due to technical difficulties and the failed, disastrous attempts by the French at the Church of San Luigi dei Francesi in Rome.

== Description ==
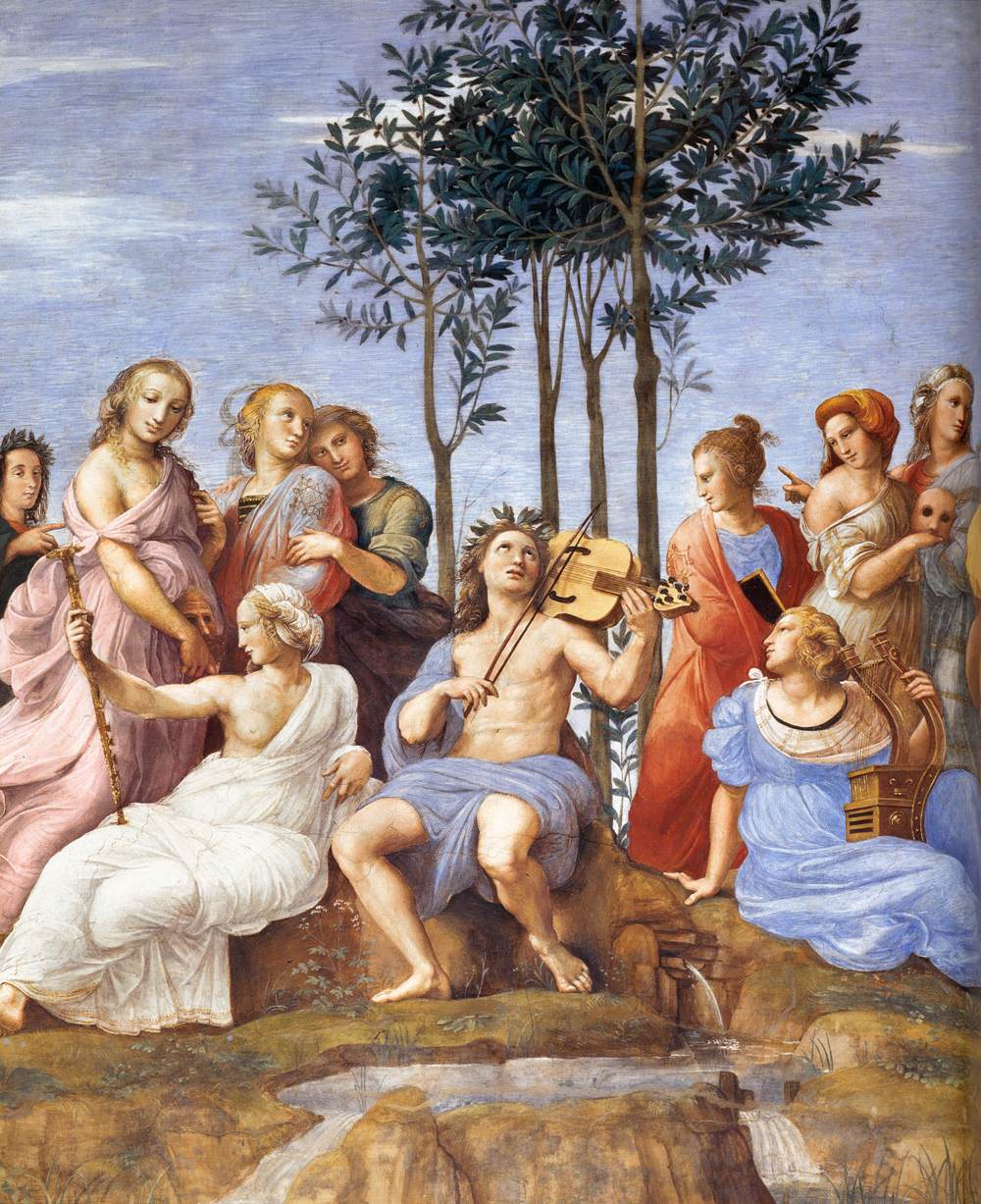
The Parnassus, detail

The iconographic theme is that of the ideal organization of humanistic culture, divided into theology, philosophy, poetry, and jurisprudence, each corresponding to a wall and the female personification depicted in the ceiling medallion. Additionally, it can be read as an exaltation of the Neoplatonic categories of the True, the Good, and the Beautiful. The Rational and Natural Truth is represented by the School of Athens; the Theological Truth (the Supreme Truth, God) by the Disputation of the Holy Sacrament; the Beautiful by the Parnassus; the Good by the Virtues and the Law depicted in the ceiling and the wall of the Virtues, both as canon law (Gregory IX Approves the Decretals) and civil law (Tribonian Presents the Pandects to Justinian).

While the walls display a vast representation of illustrious figures, typified in their features, the scenes on the ceiling are more idealized, with personifications of the Revealed Truth, the Rational Truth, the Good, and the Beautiful. In the main scenes, Raphael refused to create a simple gallery of portraits, as done, for example, by Perugino in the Collegio del Cambio or Pinturicchio in the Borgia Apartment, but sought to involve the characters in action, characterizing them with movements and expressions. This is particularly evident from the first fresco, the Disputation of the Holy Sacrament. Typical Renaissance themes, such as the harmony between ancient and modern wisdom, pagan and Christian, poetry as a source of revelation and knowledge, and justice as the culmination of ethical virtues, are thus represented through actions in a completely natural and direct manner. Instead of the hermetic representations of his predecessors, Raphael created scenes that were meant to appear concrete and eloquent, familiar thanks to his extraordinary mastery of the pictorial medium.

Originally, the lower register, at human height, was decorated, as in the Sala delle Udienze del Collegio del Cambio in Perugia or the Studiolo of Federico da Montefeltro in Urbino, with a covering of inlaid wooden panels, handled starting in 1508 by Fra Giovanni da Verona.

These are the frescoes on the walls:

1. Disputation of the Holy Sacrament (Theology)
2. The School of Athens (Philosophy)
3. The Parnassus (Poetry)
4. Cardinal and Theological Virtues, with Gregory IX Approves the Decretals (canon law) and Tribonian Presents the Pandects to Justinian (civil law)

=== Ceiling ===
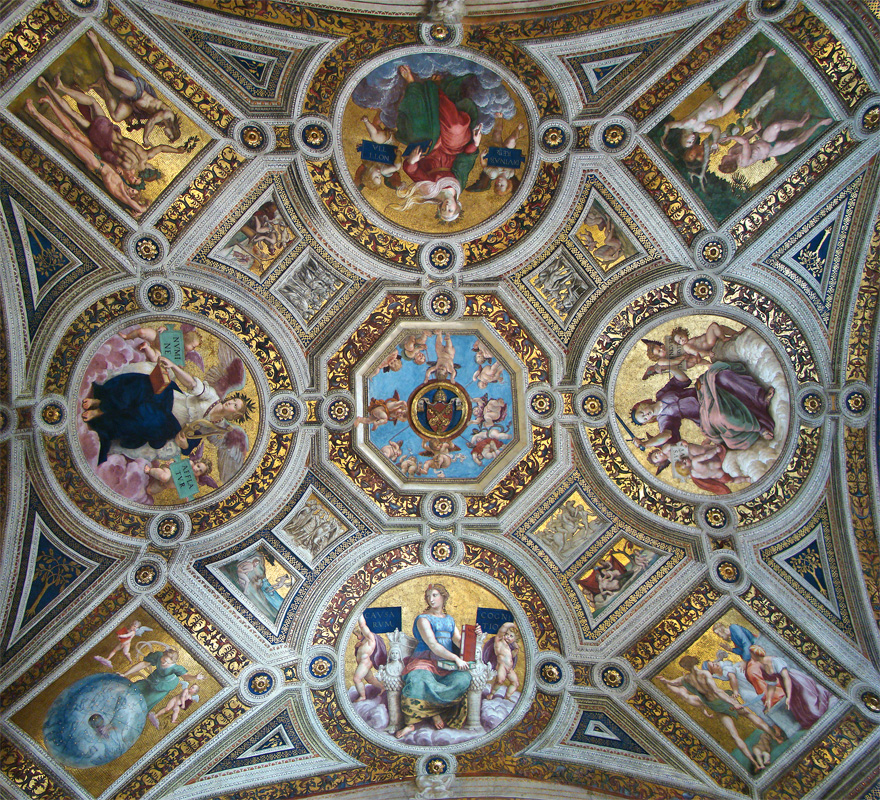
The ceiling of Stanza della Segnatura

The ceiling was the first part to be frescoed, starting from the end of 1508. Frames with grotesques divide the space into thirteen compartments. At the center is an octagon with putti holding the papal Della Rovere coat of arms. Around it are four thrones (diameter 180 cm) with personifications of Theology, Justice, Philosophy, and Poetry. At the corners are four panels in imitation mosaic (120 x 105 cm each) with Adam and Eve (Raphael), the Judgment of Solomon (Raphael), the Prime Mover (Raphael), and Apollo and Marsyas (Raphael.)

Between the octagon and the rectangles are four smaller trapezoidal compartments with rounded sides. Each contains two representations: the upper one in monochrome, with a historical subject derived from Livy, and the lower one in polychrome, with a mythological subject derived from Hyginus (astronomer). Small triangular spaces between the medallions and the main panels are decorated with Della Rovere oaks.

In the larger compartments, the figures simulate relief effects on a gold background imitating mosaic. The scenes depicted are directly linked to the lunettes below and the elements, as are the putti painted on the arches of each lunette, each with an emblem characterizing it as a genius of an element. The exception is the putti of air and fire, which appear swapped, suggesting a change in the program during execution.

The resulting scheme is as follows:

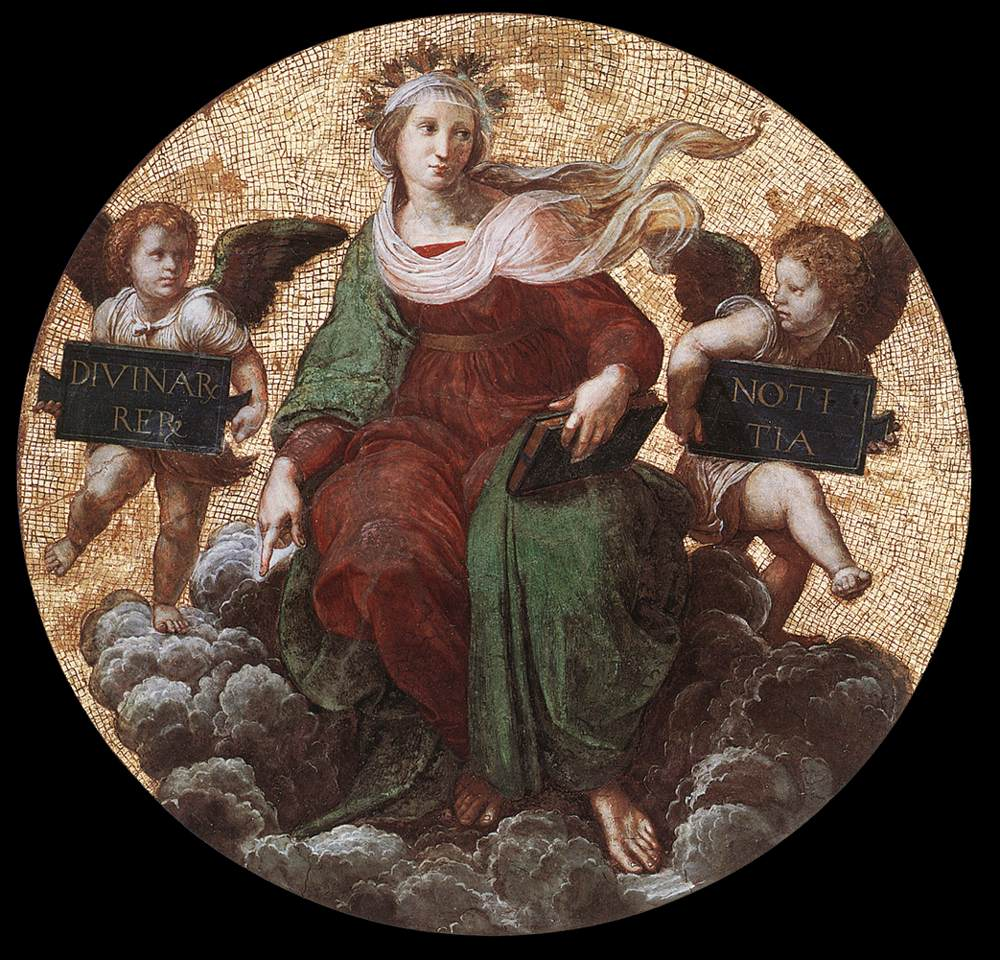
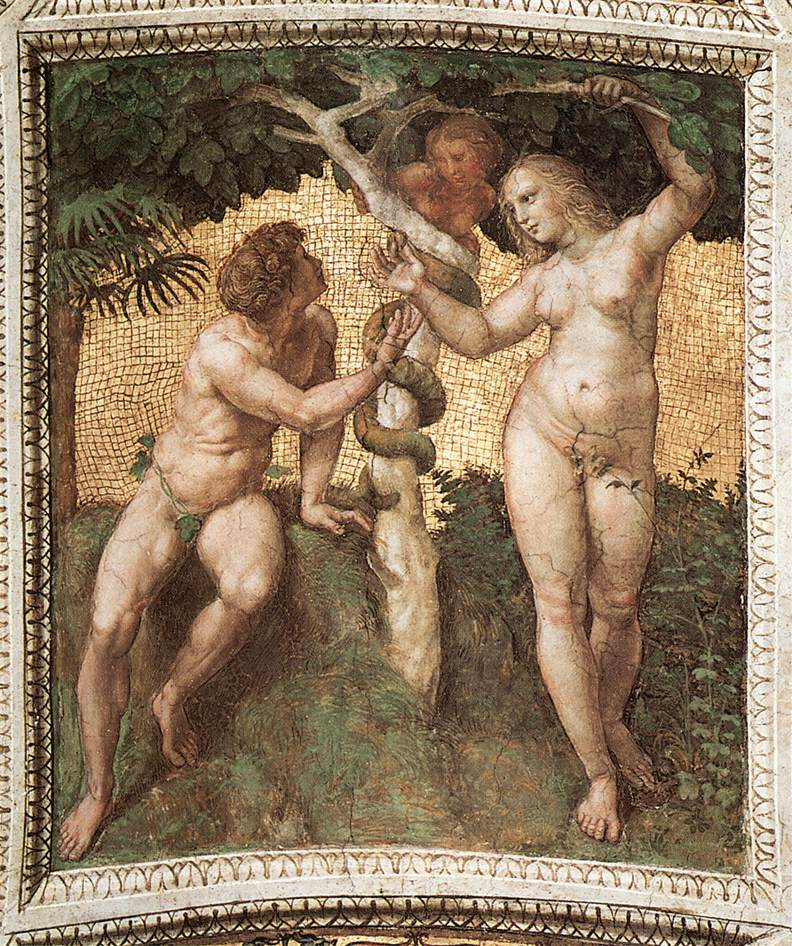
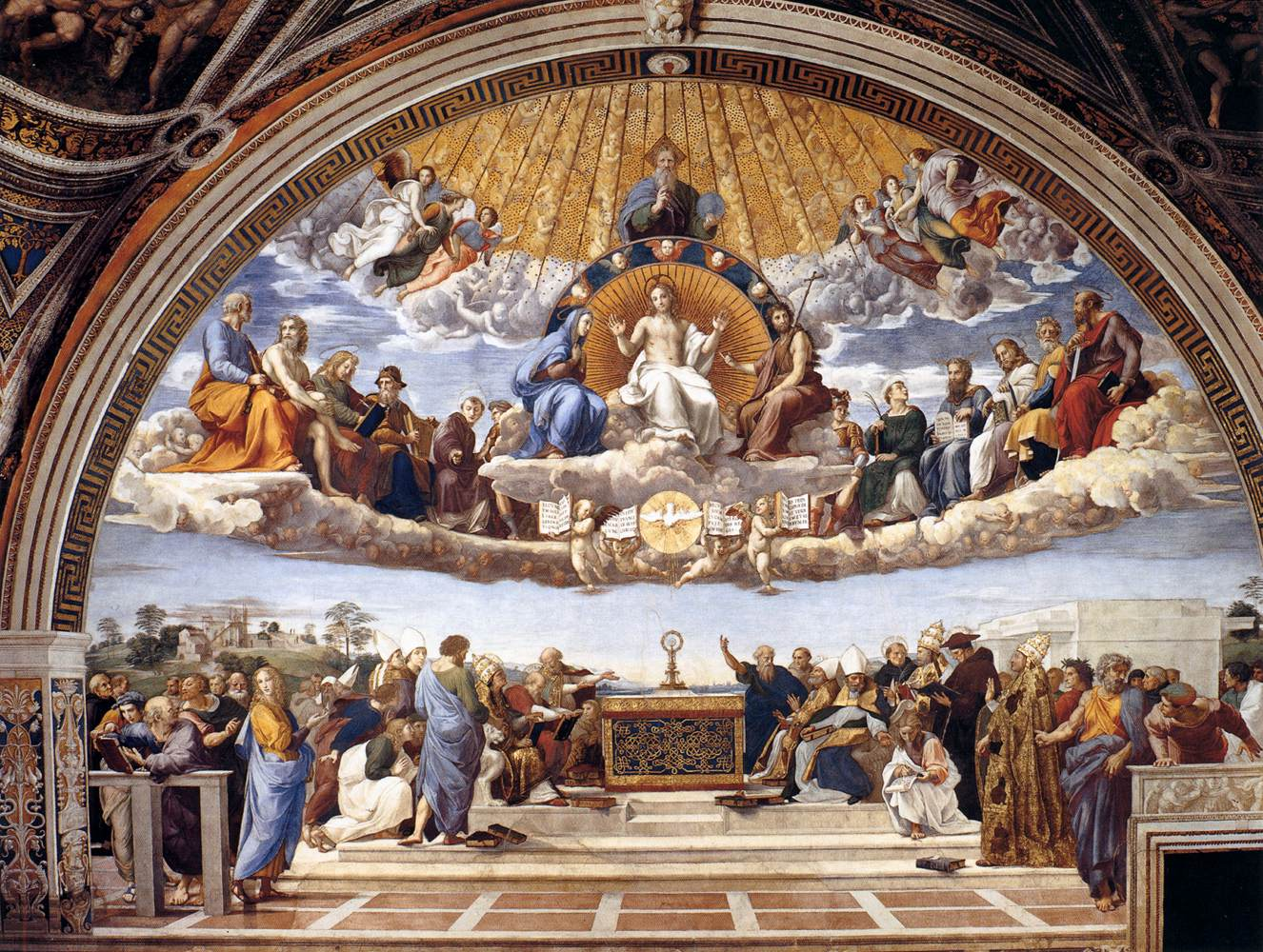
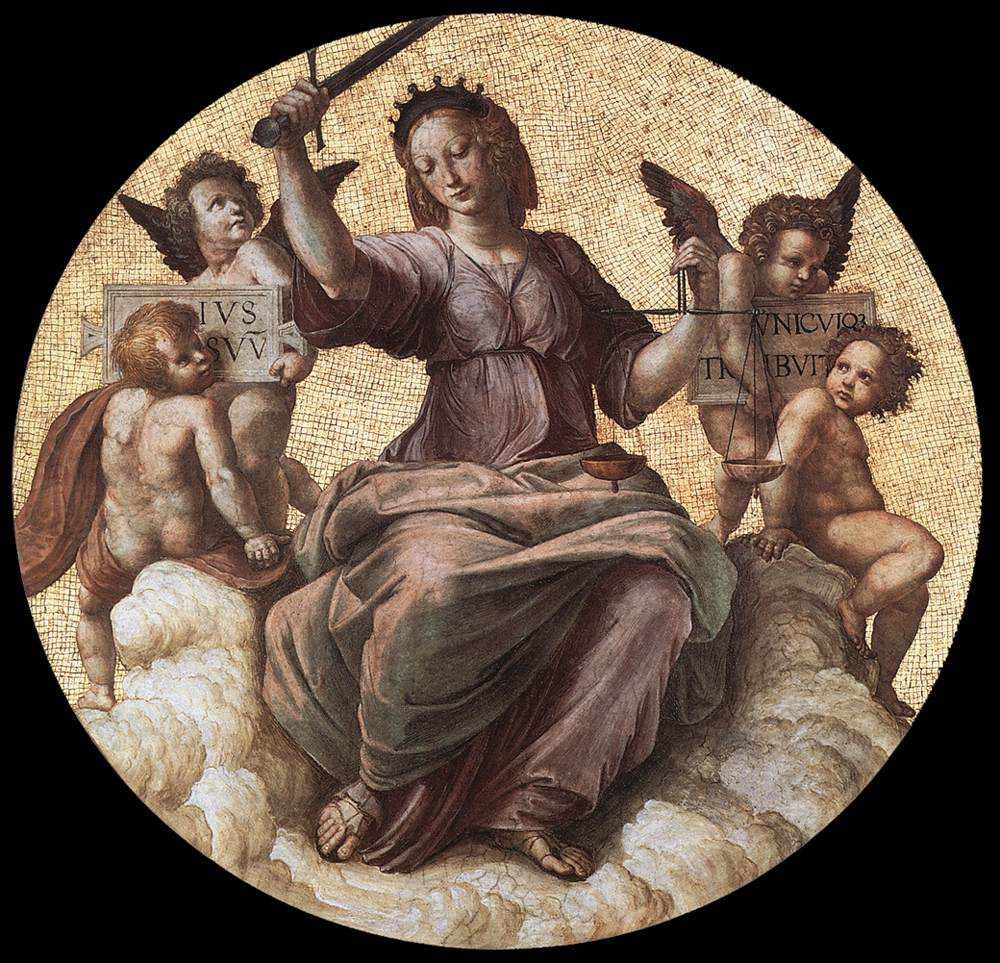
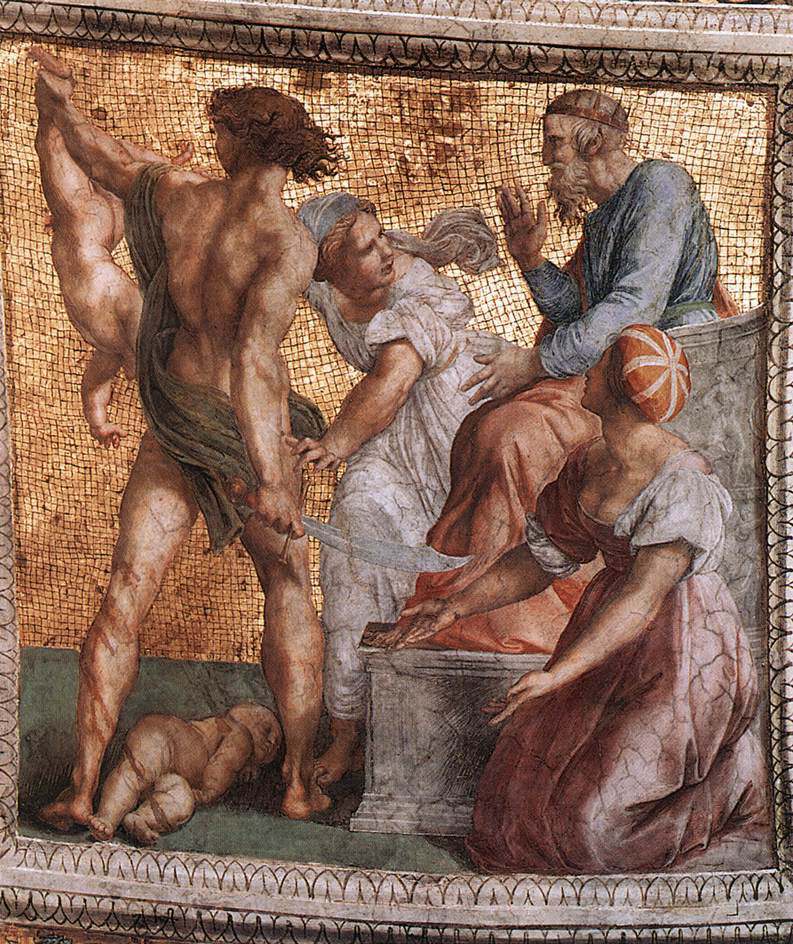
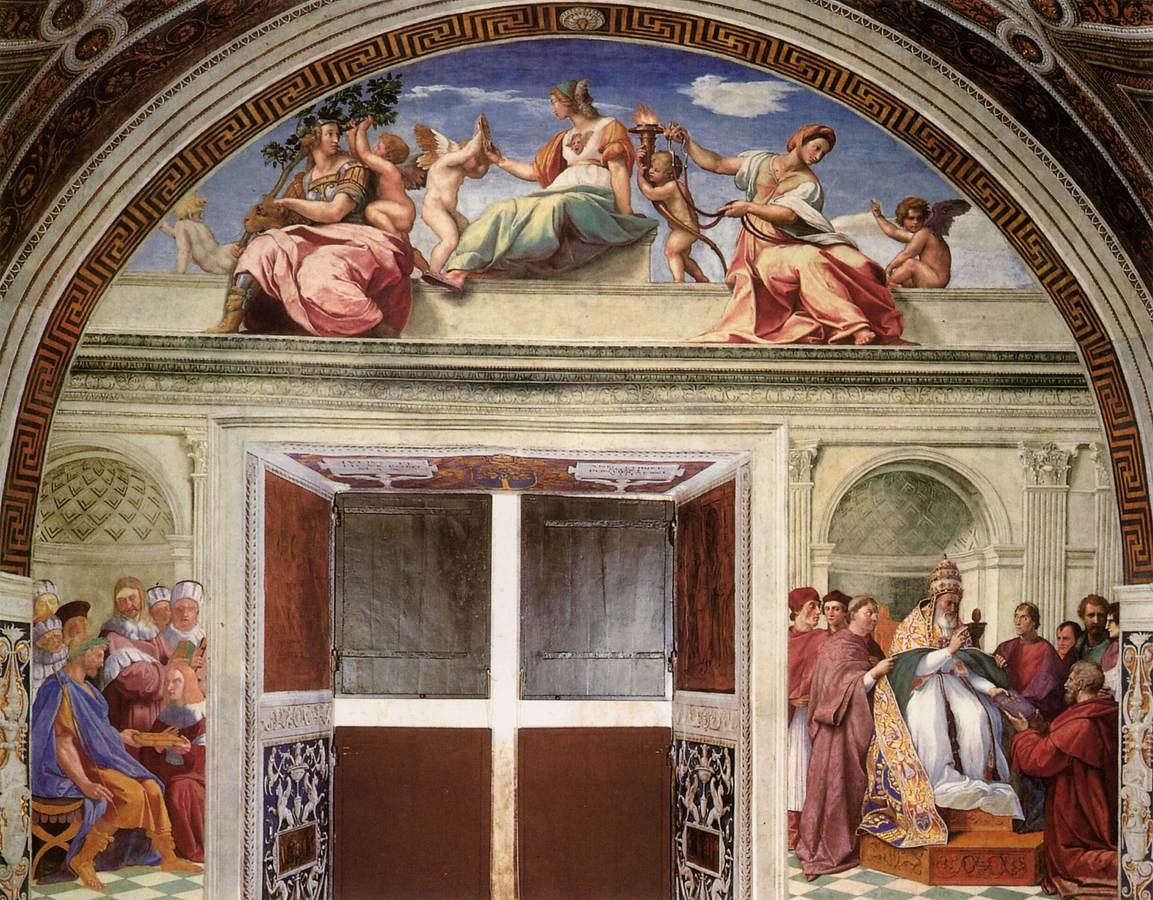
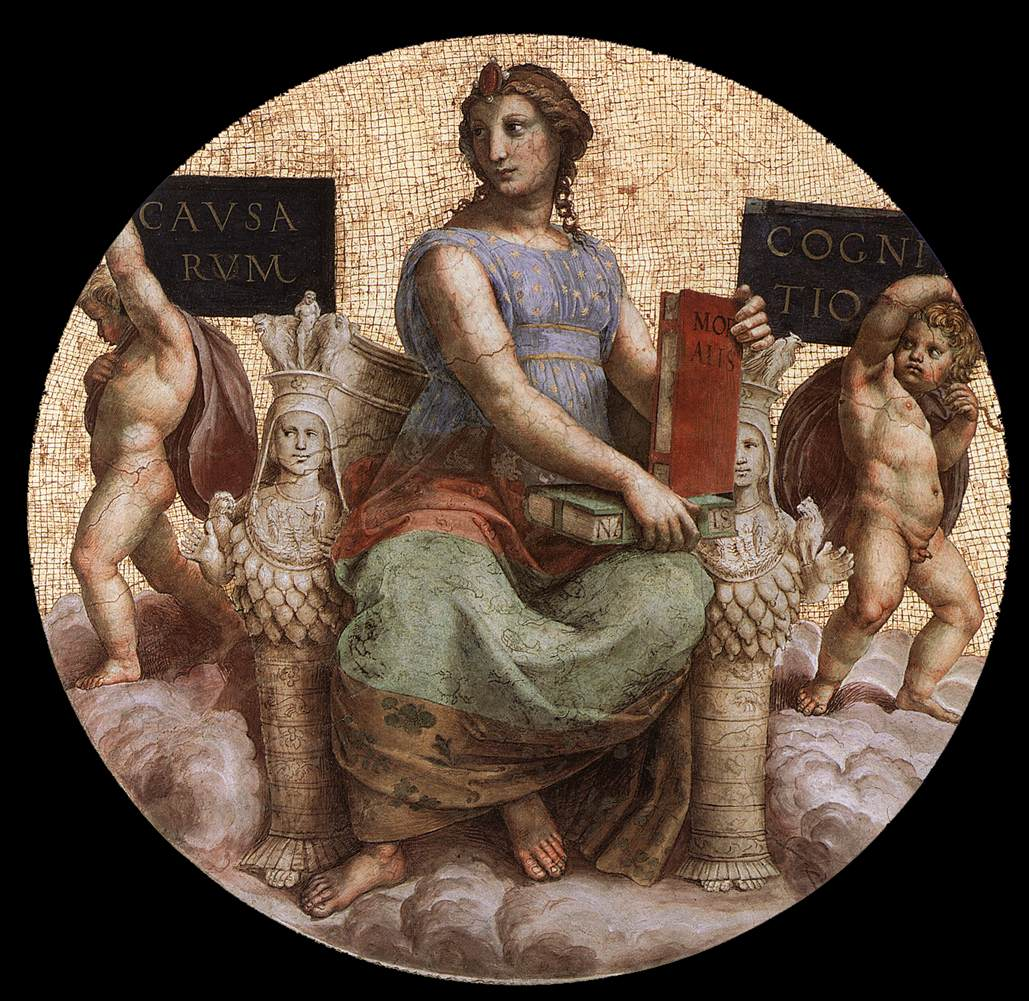
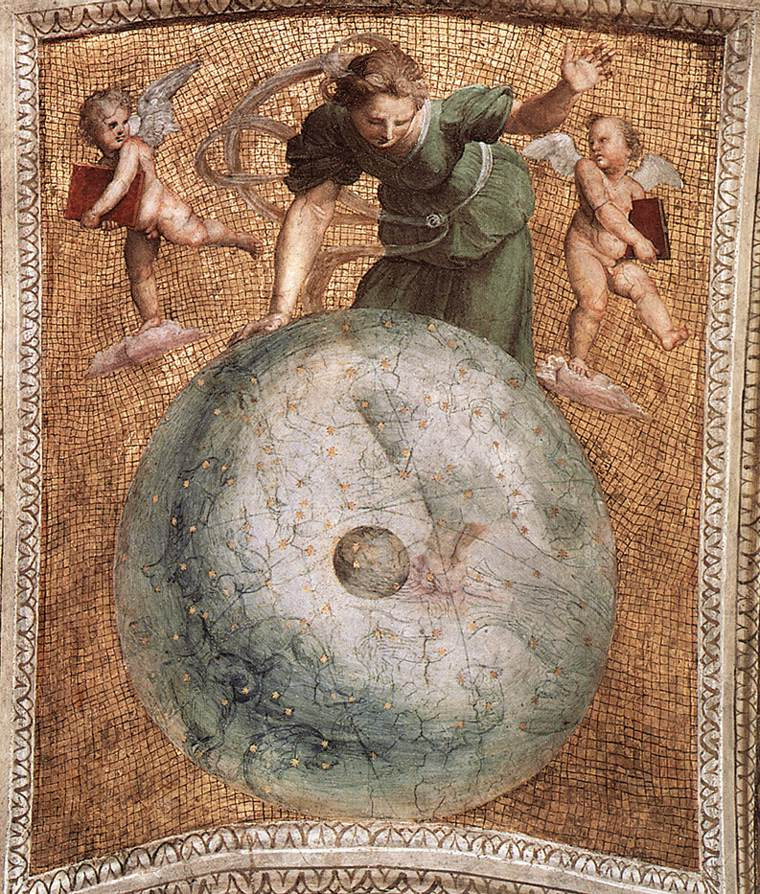
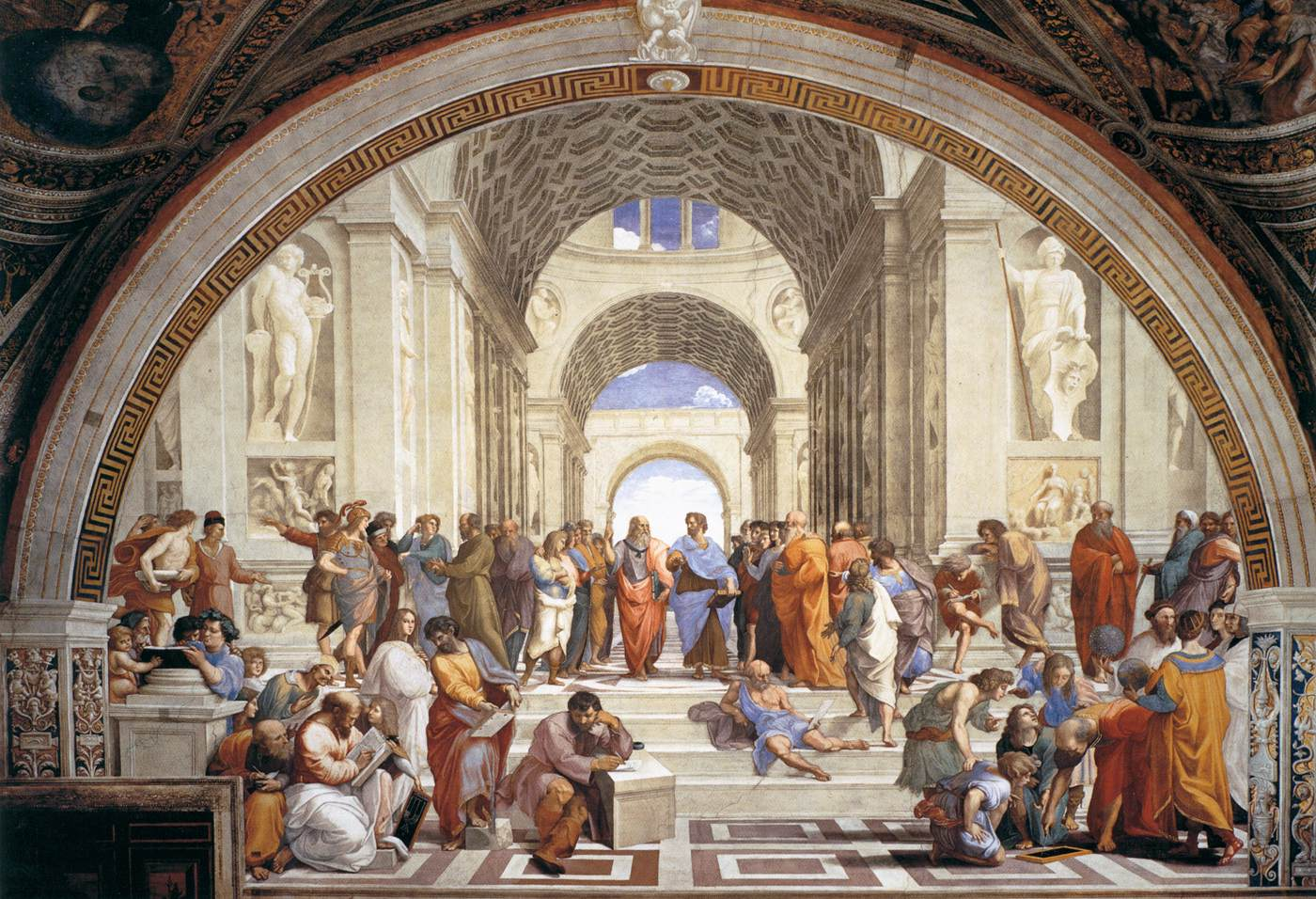
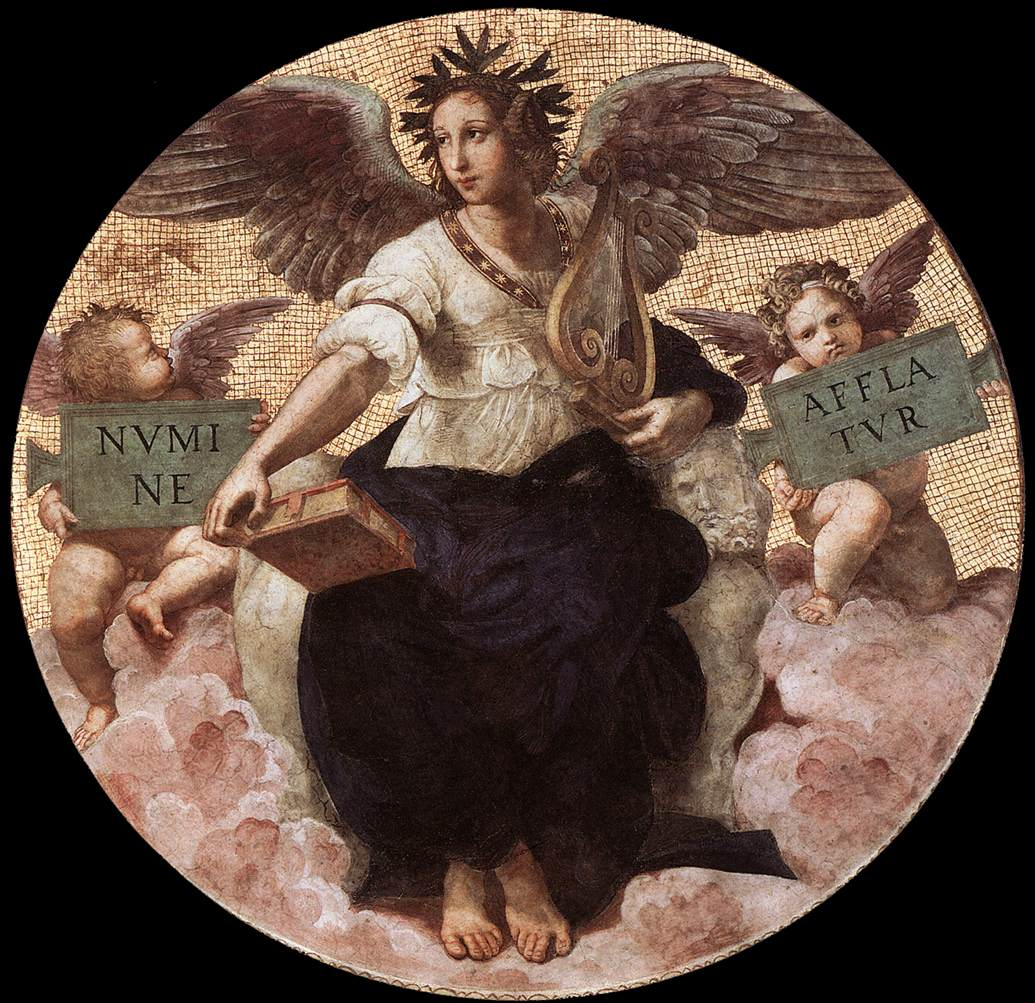
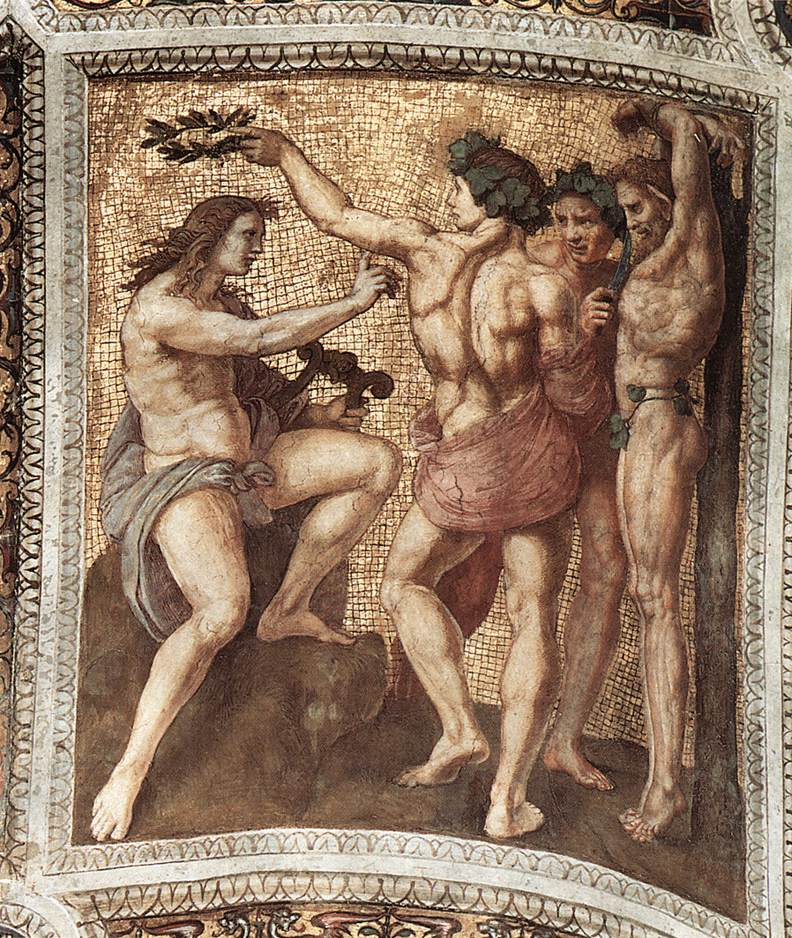
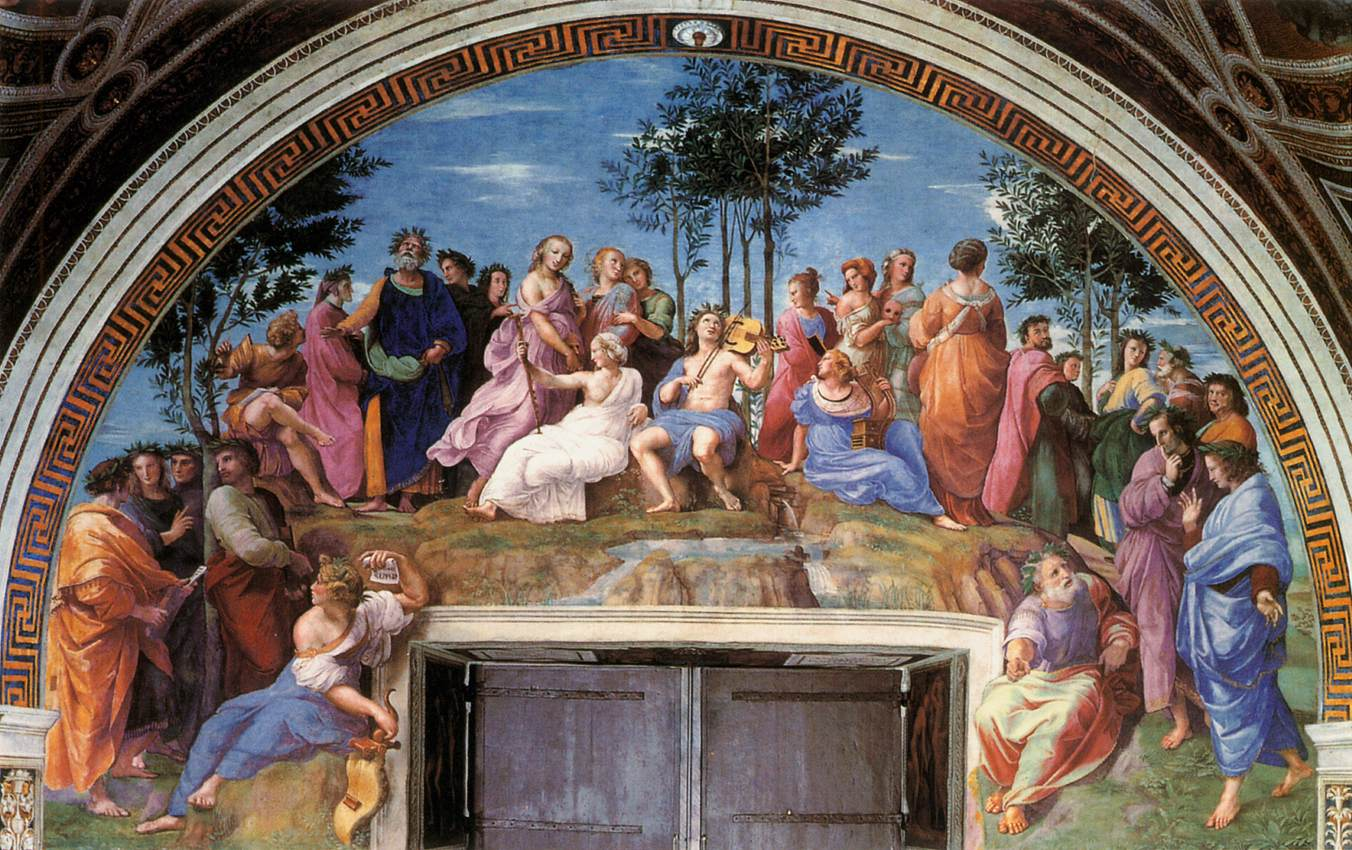
Wall	Image	Medallion	Image	Panel	Image	Lunette	Element	Putto
West		Theology		Adam and Eve		Disputation of the Holy Sacrament	Fire	Air
South		Justice		Judgment of Solomon		Cardinal and Theological Virtues	Earth	Earth
East		Philosophy		Prime Mover		School of Athens	Water	Water
North		Poetry		Apollo and Marsyas		The Parnassus	Air	Fire

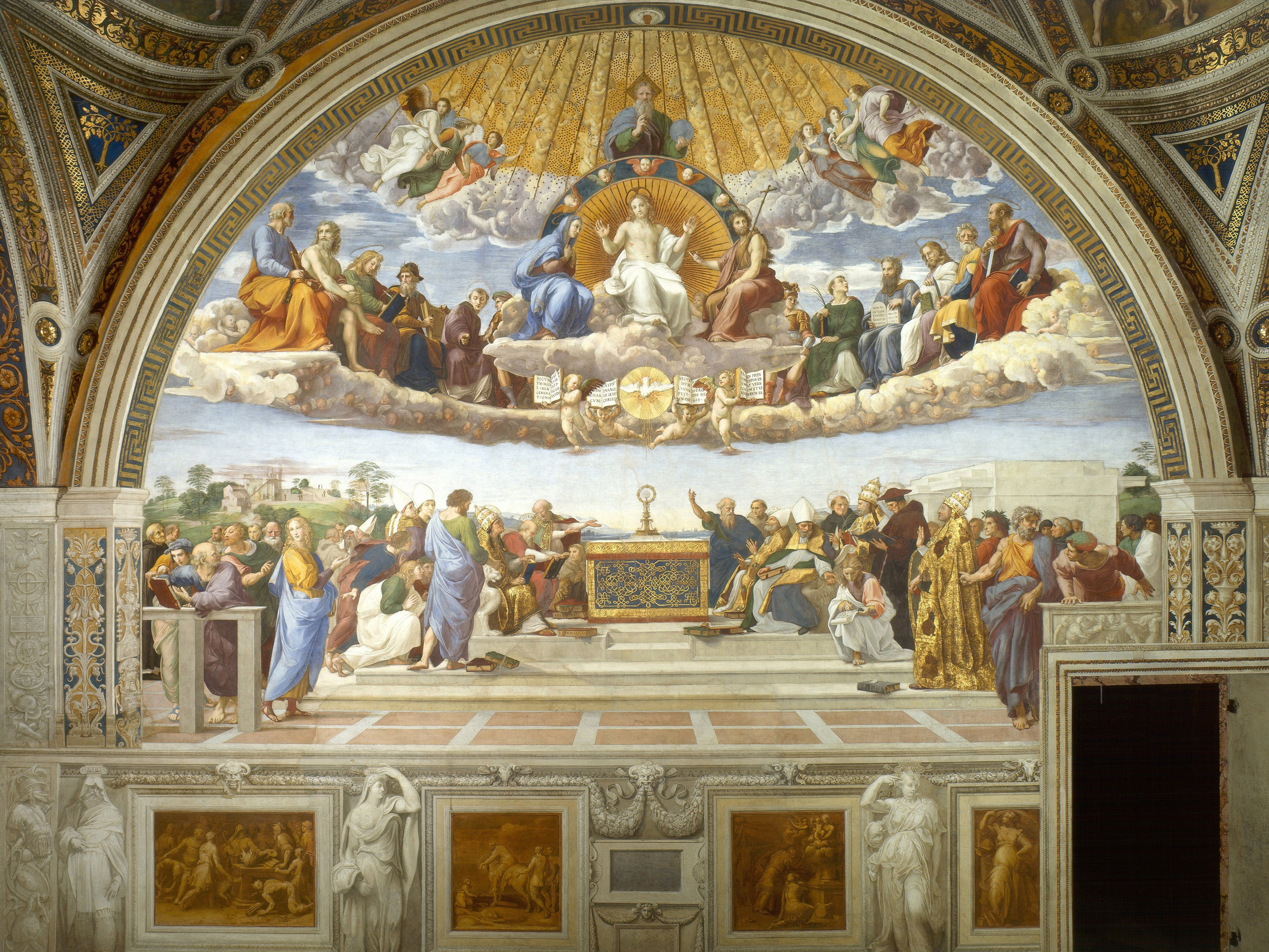
Disputation of the Holy Sacrament

=== Disputation of the Holy Sacrament ===
As mentioned above, in the Disputation of the Holy Sacrament, Raphael transformed the parade of theologians from a simple gallery of portraits into a true assembly, where the Church Militant, in the lower half, acts in the presence of the Church Triumphant, in the upper circle of clouds. The study of numerous preparatory drawings shows a progressive emphasis on the gestures and emotional warmth of the characters, coordinated around a focal point represented by the consecrated host above the altar.

=== School of Athens ===
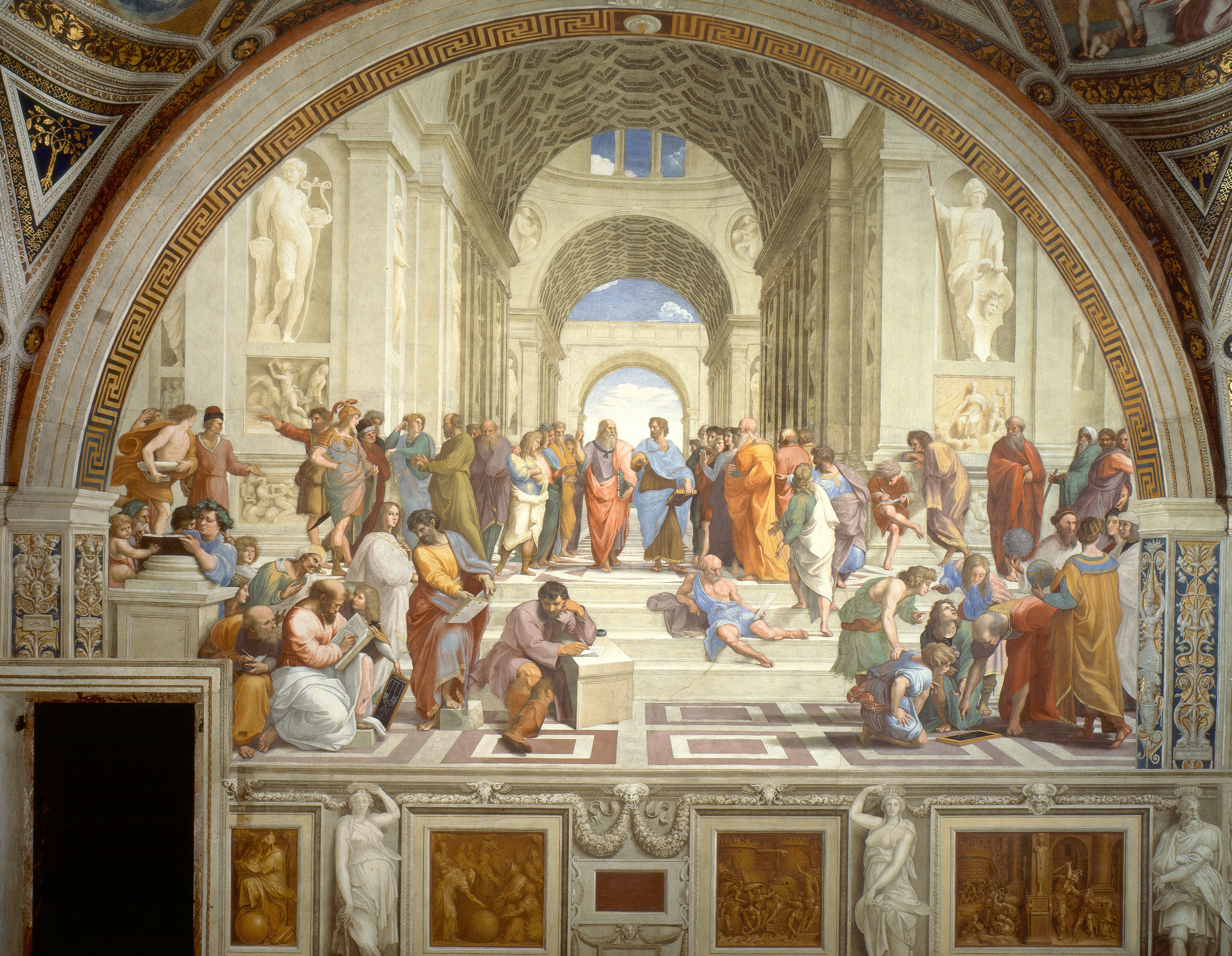
The School of Athens

The School of Athens, dedicated to philosophy, is set in a deep nave of an open building, inspired by Bramante's designs for the new St. Peter's Basilica, evoking the idea of a "temple of wisdom." It features philosophers and sages of antiquity gathered on a staircase around Plato and Aristotle at the apex. The groups are dynamically arranged, linking gestures and expressions, respecting a certain symbolic hierarchy without ever stiffening the representation, which always appears fluid and natural.

Raphael assigned the likenesses of contemporary artists (Leonardo, Michelangelo, Bramante, himself, and Sodoma) to various characters, as if to reaffirm the new, proud intellectual dignity of the modern artist.

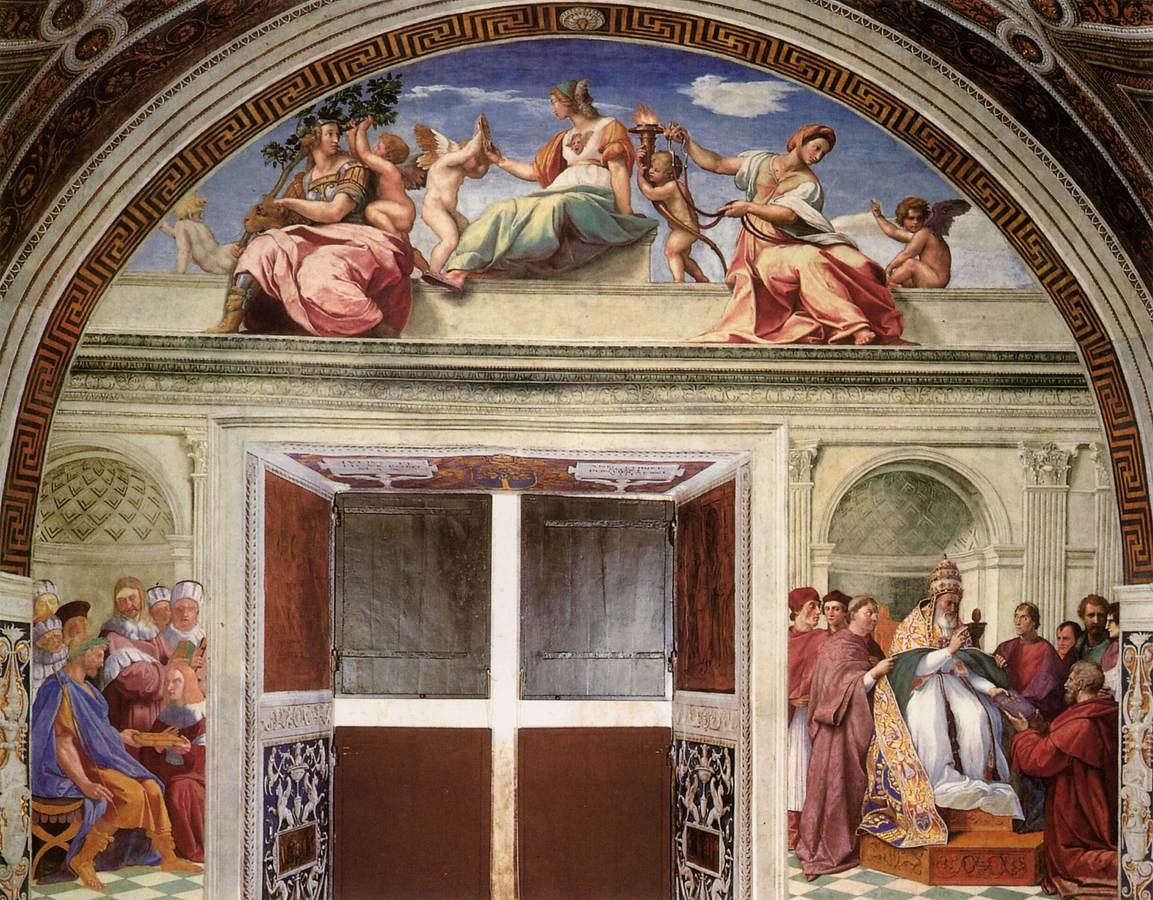
Cardinal and Theological Virtues

=== Other decorations ===
The baseboard by Perino del Vaga features a series of imitation wood panels, framed in monochrome and topped with a garland, while between them are some caryatids in faux relief or panels imitating red porphyry veining. Below the Disputation of the Holy Sacrament are scenes of a Pagan Sacrifice, the Vision of St. Augustine of the Child by the Sea, and the Tiburtine Sibyl Showing the Virgin to Augustus. Below the Cardinal and Theological Virtues are Solon Addressing the Athenian People (left) and Moses Bringing the Tablets of the Law to the Hebrews (right). Below the School of Athens are Philosophy, the Magi Discussing the Celestial Sphere, and the Death of Archimedes and Siege of Syracuse. Below the Parnassus are painted inlays imitating bench backs.

In the mosaic floor in Cosmatesque style, the emblems of Nicholas V and Leo X are visible, as well as the name of Julius II.

== See also ==
- Raphael Rooms
- Roman Renaissance

== Bibliography ==
- Roma [Rome] (in Italian). Milan: Touring Editore. 2008. ISBN 978-88-365-4134-8.
- Beck, James (1993). Raphael: The Stanza della Segnatura. New York: George Braziller. ISBN 0-8076-1314-2.
- De Vecchi, Pierluigi (1975). Raffaello [Raphael] (in Italian). Milan: Rizzoli.
- De Vecchi, Pierluigi; Cerchiari, Elda (1999). I tempi dell'arte [The Times of Art] (in Italian). Vol. 2. Milan: Bompiani. ISBN 88-451-7212-0.
- Emiliani, Andrea; Scolaro, Michela (2002). Raffaello. La Stanza della Segnatura [Raphael. The Stanza della Segnatura] (in Italian). Milan: Electa. ISBN 978-88-435-9822-9.
- Franzese, Paolo (2008). Raffaello [Raphael] (in Italian). Milan: Mondadori Arte. ISBN 978-88-370-6437-2.
- Gombrich, Ernst H. (1978) [1972]. Raphael's Stanza della Segnatura and the Nature of its Symbolism [Raphael's Stanza della Segnatura and the Nature of its Symbolism]. Symbolic Images. Studies in the art of the Renaissance II. Oxford: Phaidon. pp. 85–101. ISBN 0-7148-1831-3.
- Giovanni Morello, ed. (1986). Raffaello e la Roma dei Papi [Raphael and the Rome of the Popes] (in Italian). Rome: Palombi. ISBN 88-7621-568-9.. Catalogue of the exhibition at the Vatican Apostolic Library, Sistine Hall, January/October 1985 - May/October 1986.
- Redig de Campos, Deoclecio (1965). Raffaello nelle stanze [Raphael in the Rooms] (in Italian). Milan: Martello.
- Shearman, John (1993). George Holmes (ed.). The Vatican Stanze: Functions and Decoration [The Vatican Stanze: Functions and Decoration]. Art and Politics in Renaissance Italy. British Academy Lectures. New York: The British Academy and Oxford University Press. ISBN 0-19-726126-4.
