= The Parnassus =

1509–1511 fresco by Raphael

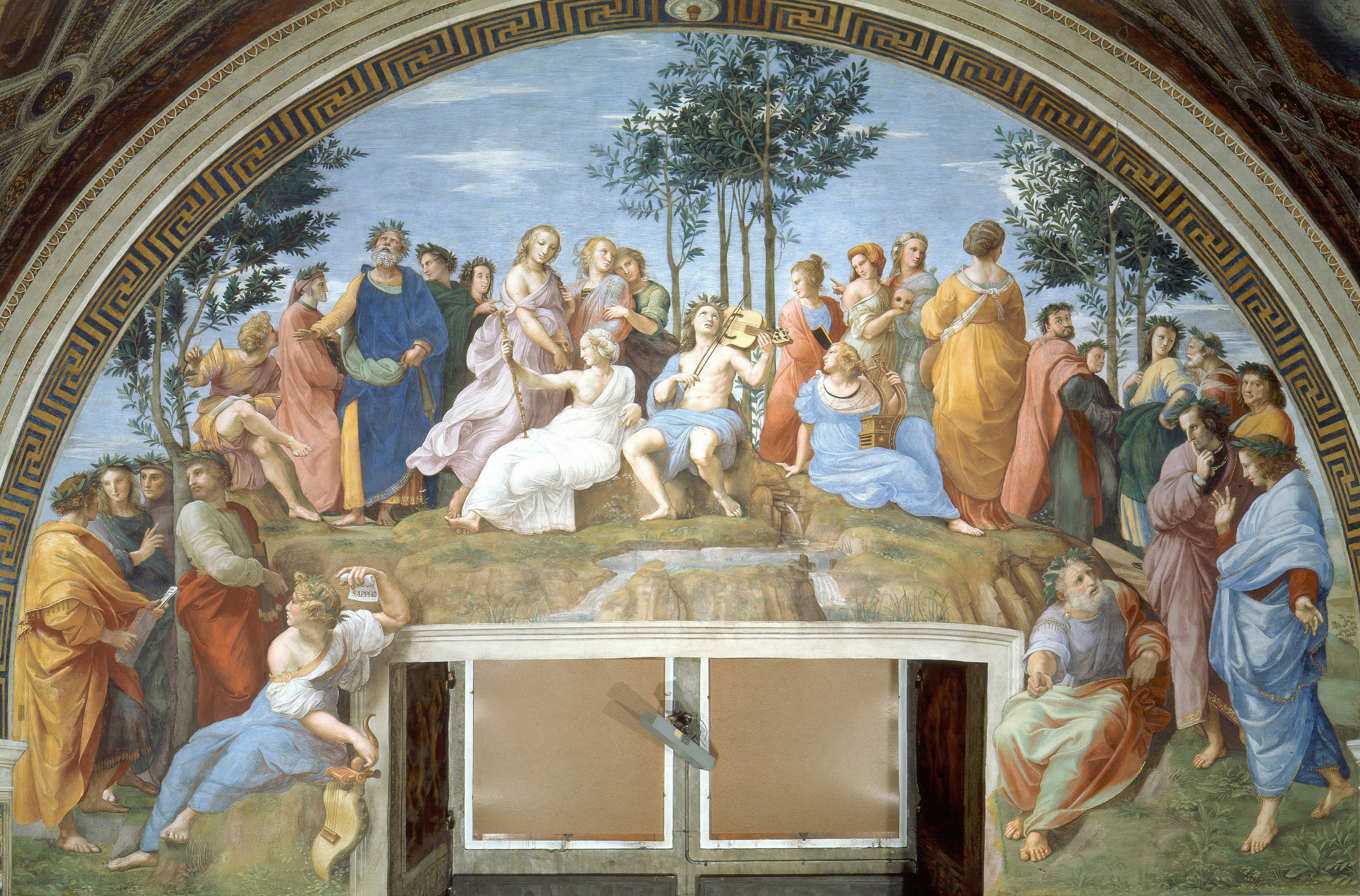
- Artist: Raphael
- Year: 1509–1511
- Type: Fresco
- Dimensions: 670 cm (260 in) wide
- Location: Apostolic Palace, Vatican Museums; Vatican City

The Parnassus (Italian: Il Parnaso, referring to Mount Parnassus) is a fresco painting by the Italian High Renaissance artist Raphael in the Raphael Rooms ("Stanze di Raffaello"), in the Palace of the Vatican in Rome, painted at the commission of Pope Julius II.

It was probably the second wall of the Stanza della Segnatura to be painted between 1509 and 1511, after La Disputa and before The School of Athens, which occupy other walls of the room.

== Overview ==
The whole room shows the four areas of human knowledge: philosophy, religion, poetry and law, with The Parnassus representing poetry. The fresco shows the mythological Mount Parnassus where Apollo dwells; he is in the centre playing an instrument (a contemporary lira da braccio rather than a classical lyre), surrounded by the nine muses, nine poets from antiquity, and nine contemporary poets. Apollo, along with Calliope, the muse of epic poetry, inspired poets.

Raphael used the face of Laocoön from the classical sculpture Laocoön and His Sons, excavated in 1506 and also in the Vatican for his Homer (in dark blue robe to the left of centre), expressing blindness rather than pain. Two of the female figures in the fresco have been said to be reminiscent of Michelangelo's Creation of Adam, Euterpe and Sappho, who is named on a scroll she holds. Sappho is the only female poet shown, presumably identified so that she is not confused with a muse; she is a late addition who does not appear in the print by Marcantonio Raimondi that records a drawing for the fresco.

The window below the fresco Parnassus frames the view of Mons Vaticanus, believed to be sacred to Apollo. Humanists, such as Biondo, Vegio, and Albertini, refer to the ancient-sun god of the Vatican.

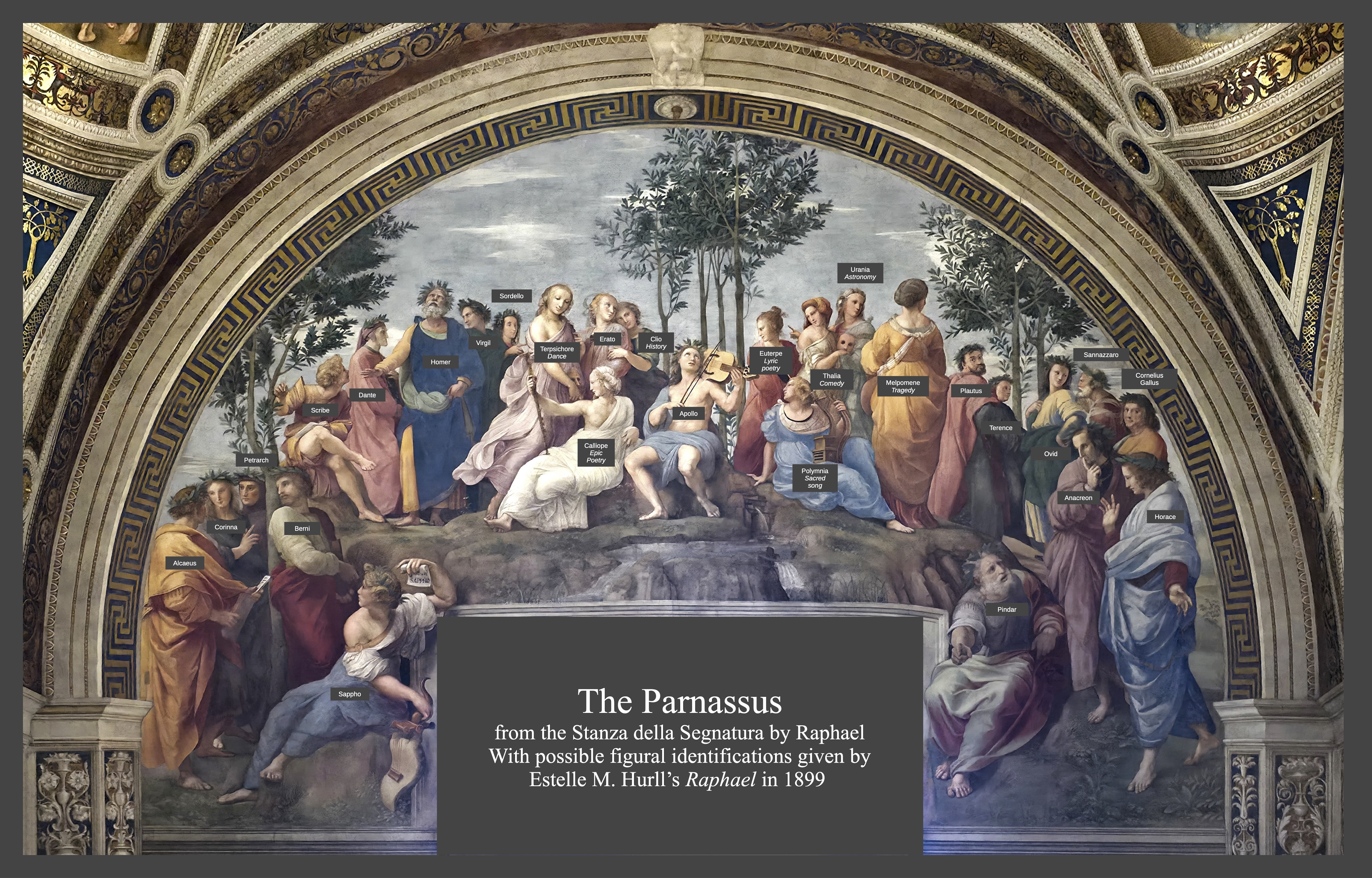
The Parnassus with possible figural identifications

== Gallery ==
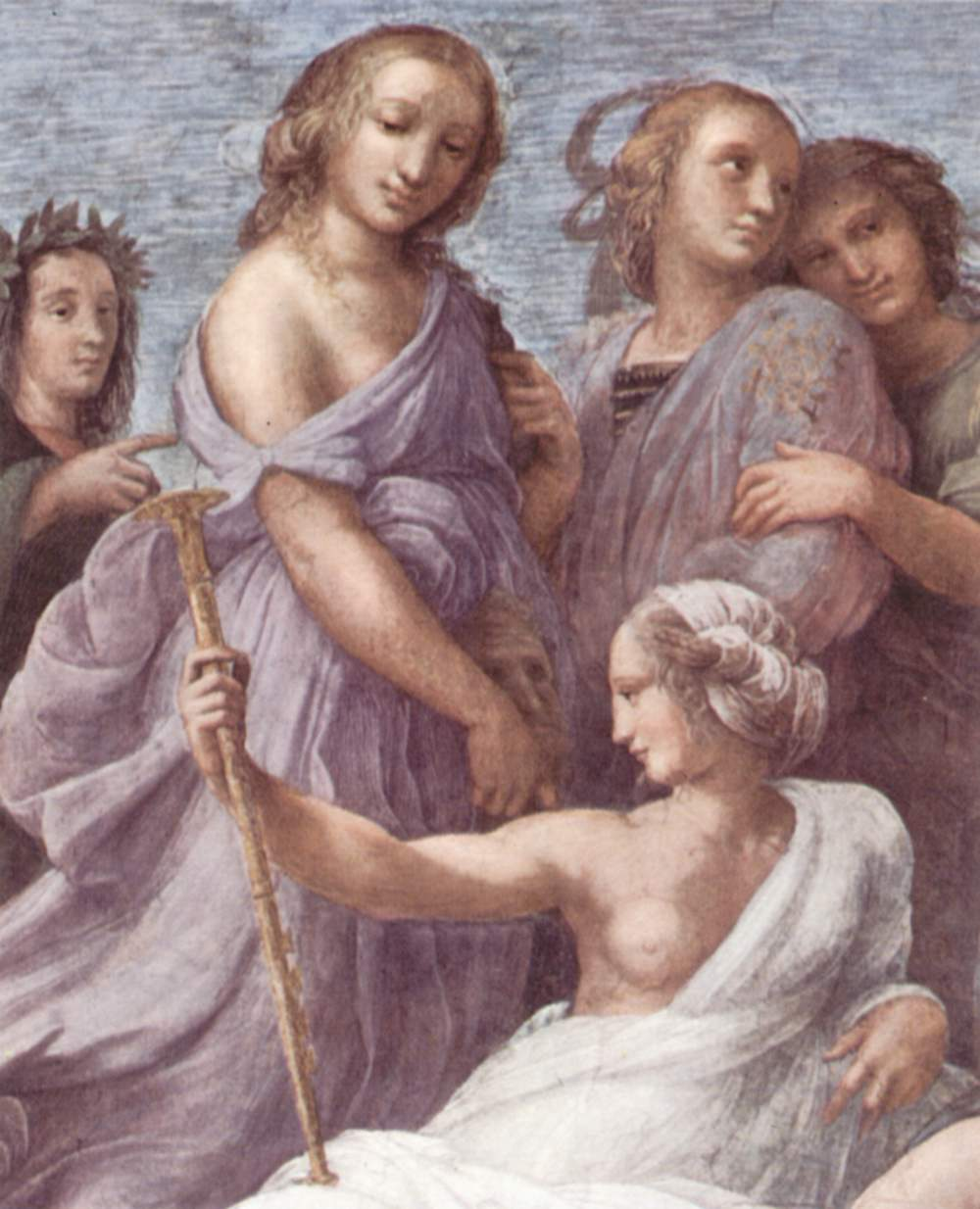
Statius, Thalia, Clio, Euterpe and Calliope

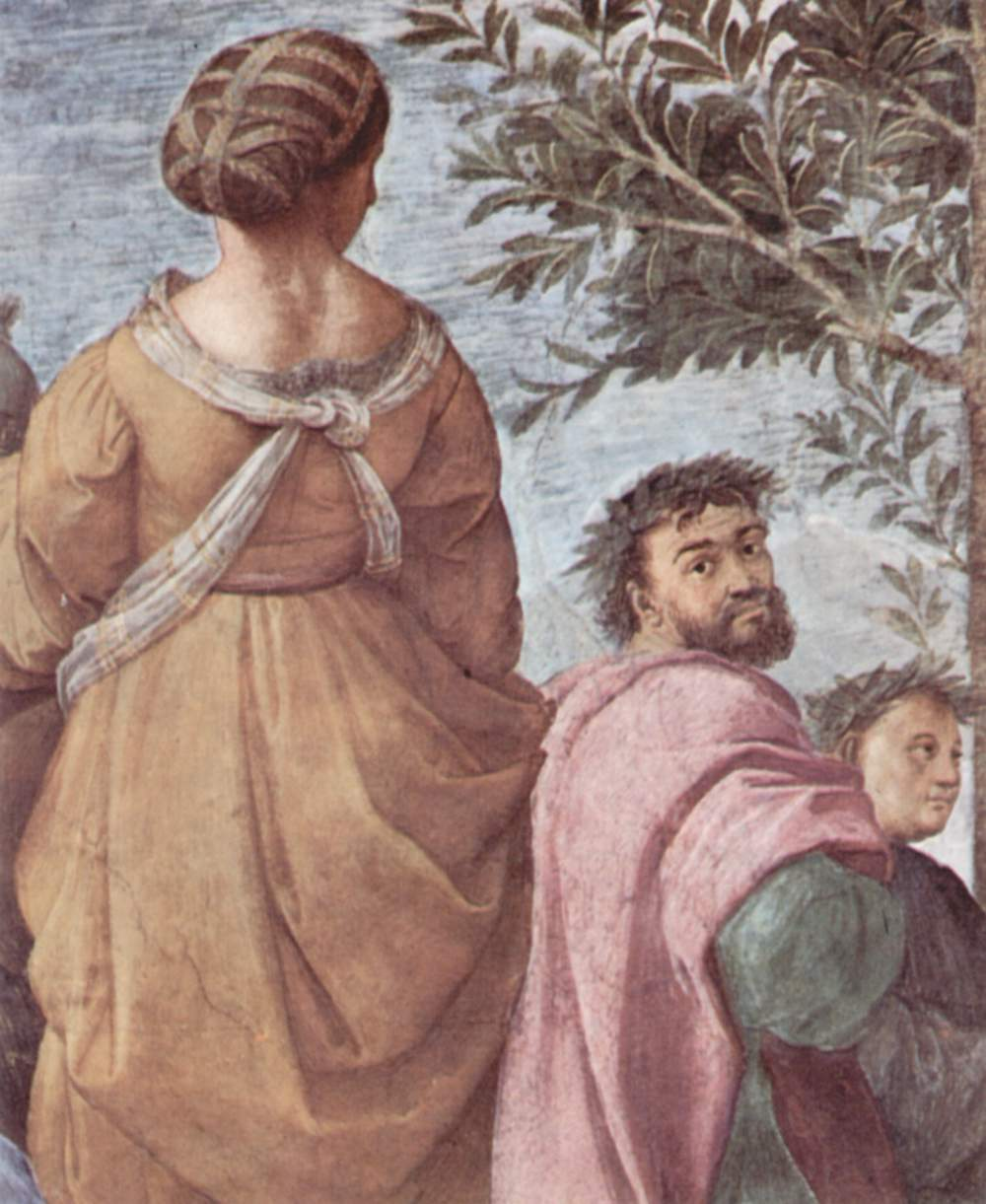
Erato, Ludovico Ariosto and Giovanni Boccaccio

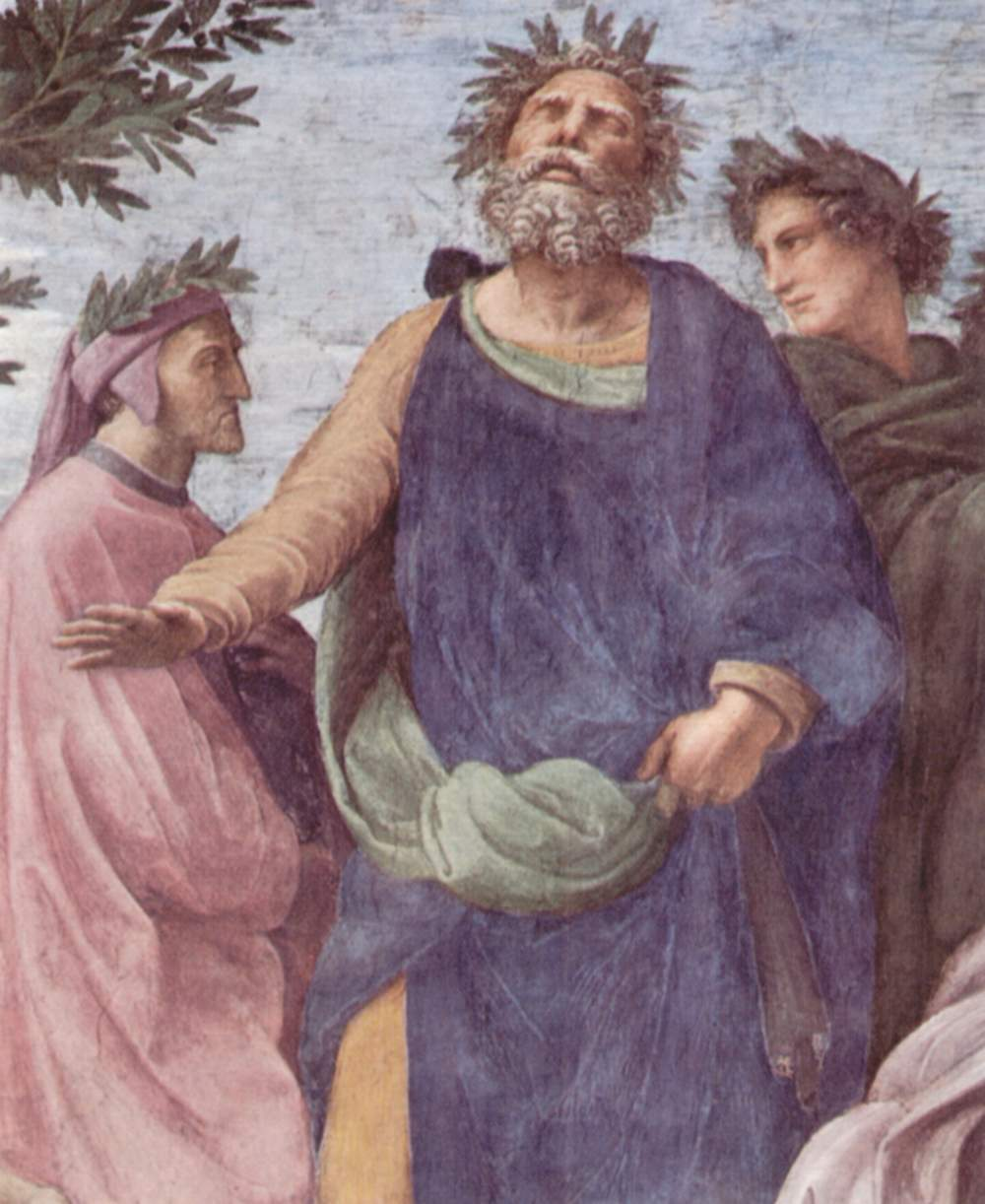
Dante Alighieri, Homer and Virgil

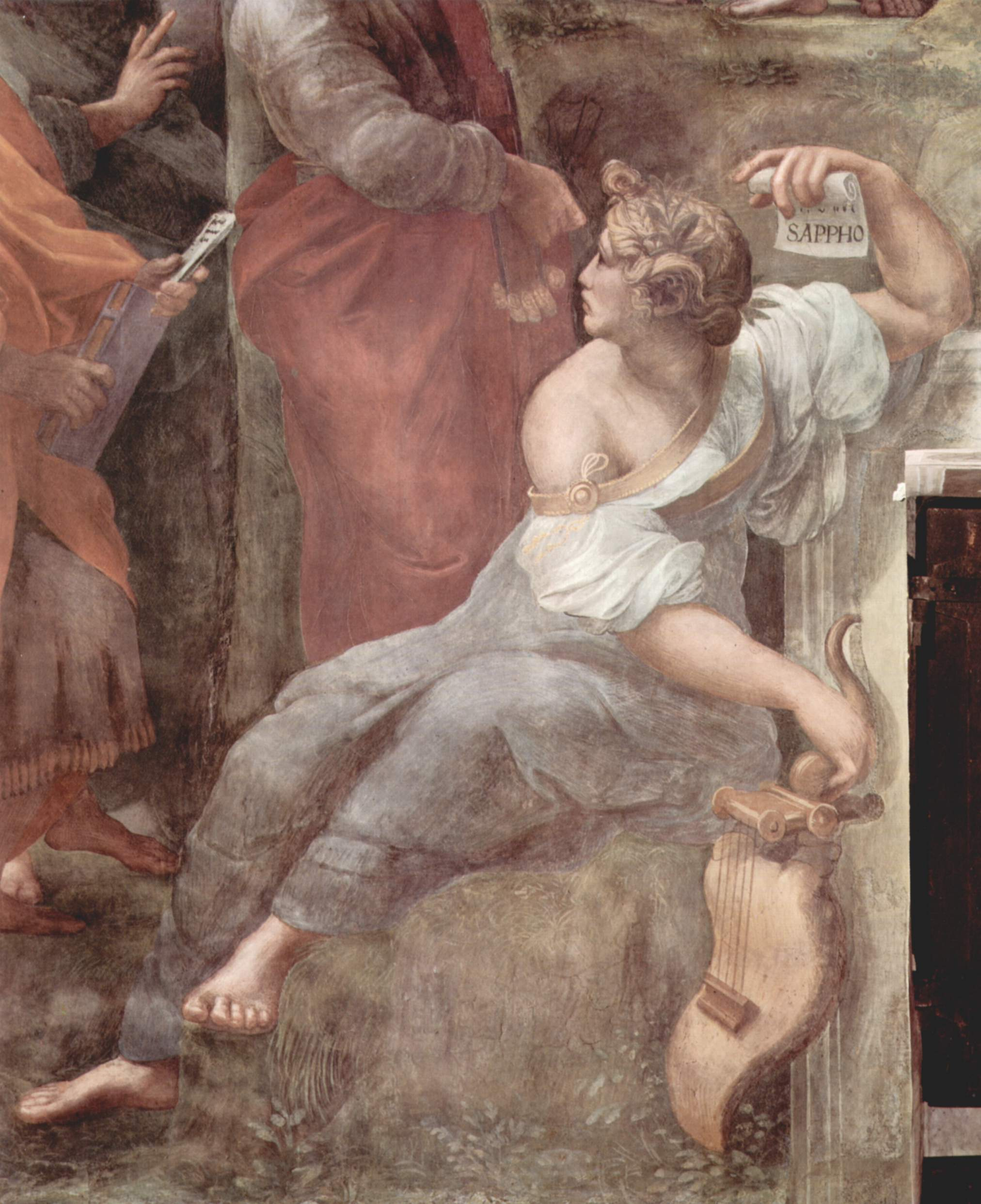
Sappho

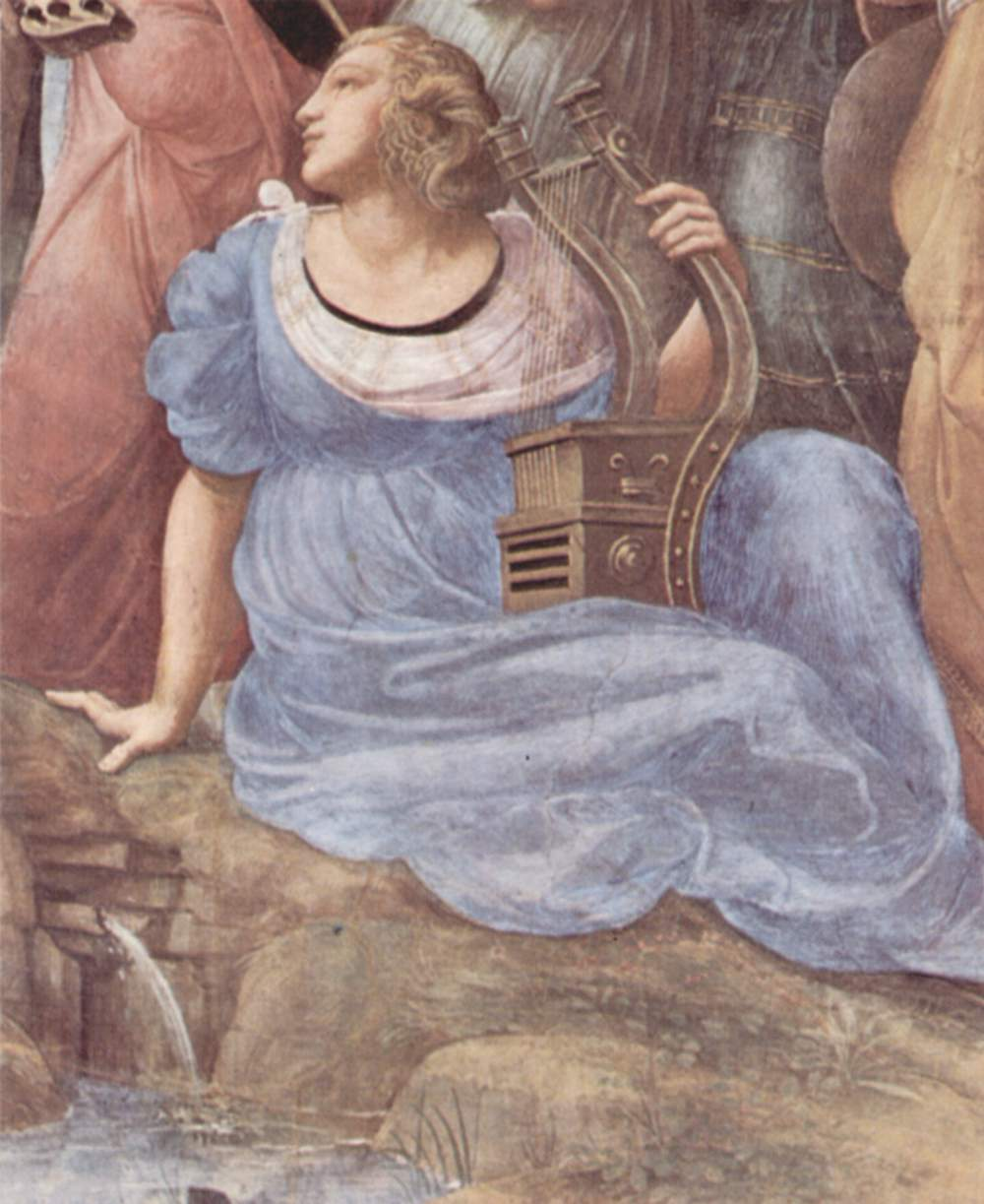
Terpsichore

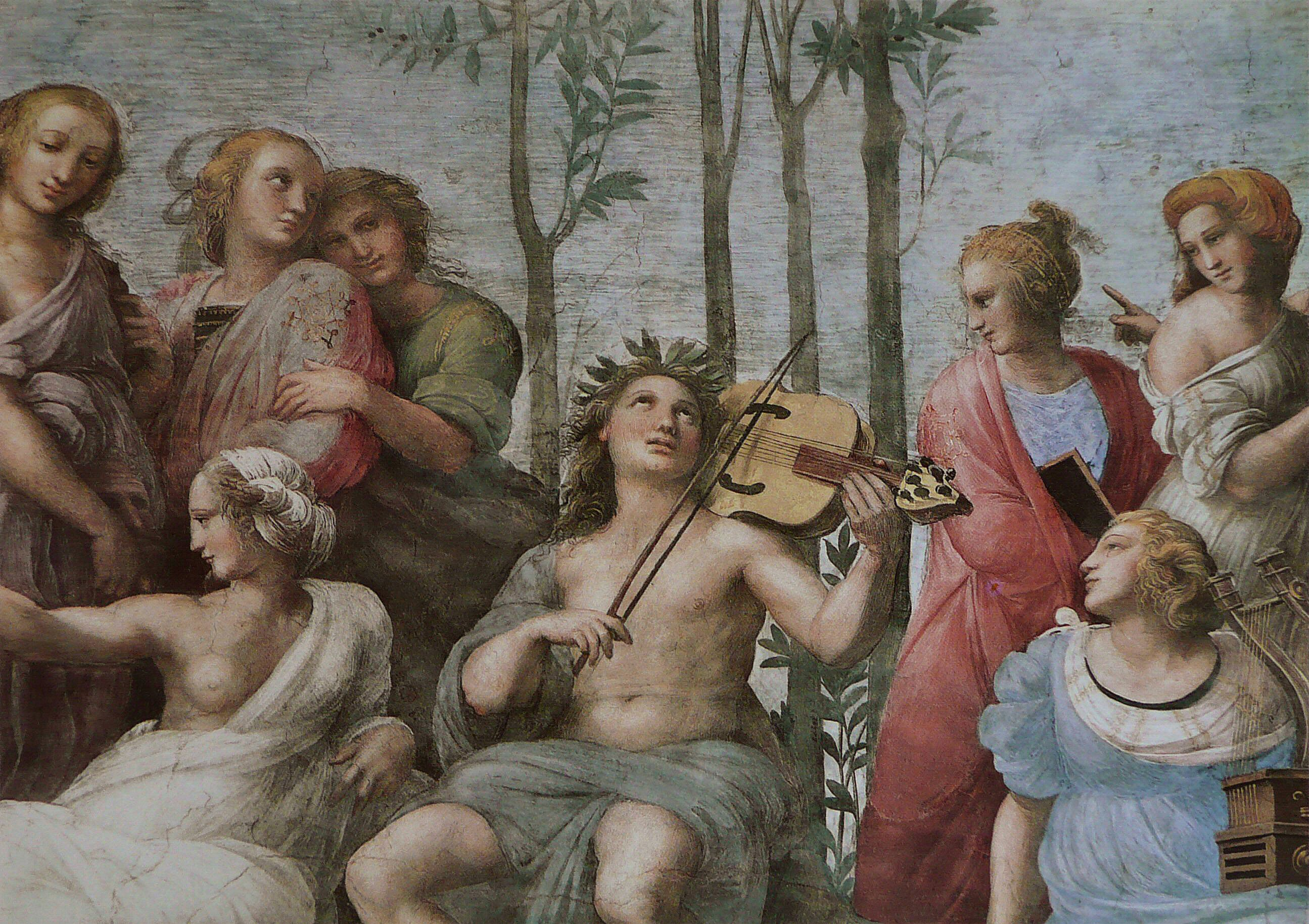
Apollo

== See also ==
- List of paintings by Raphael
- Frieze of Parnassus
