= Disputation of the Holy Sacrament =

Fresco by Raphael

Disputation of the Sacrament
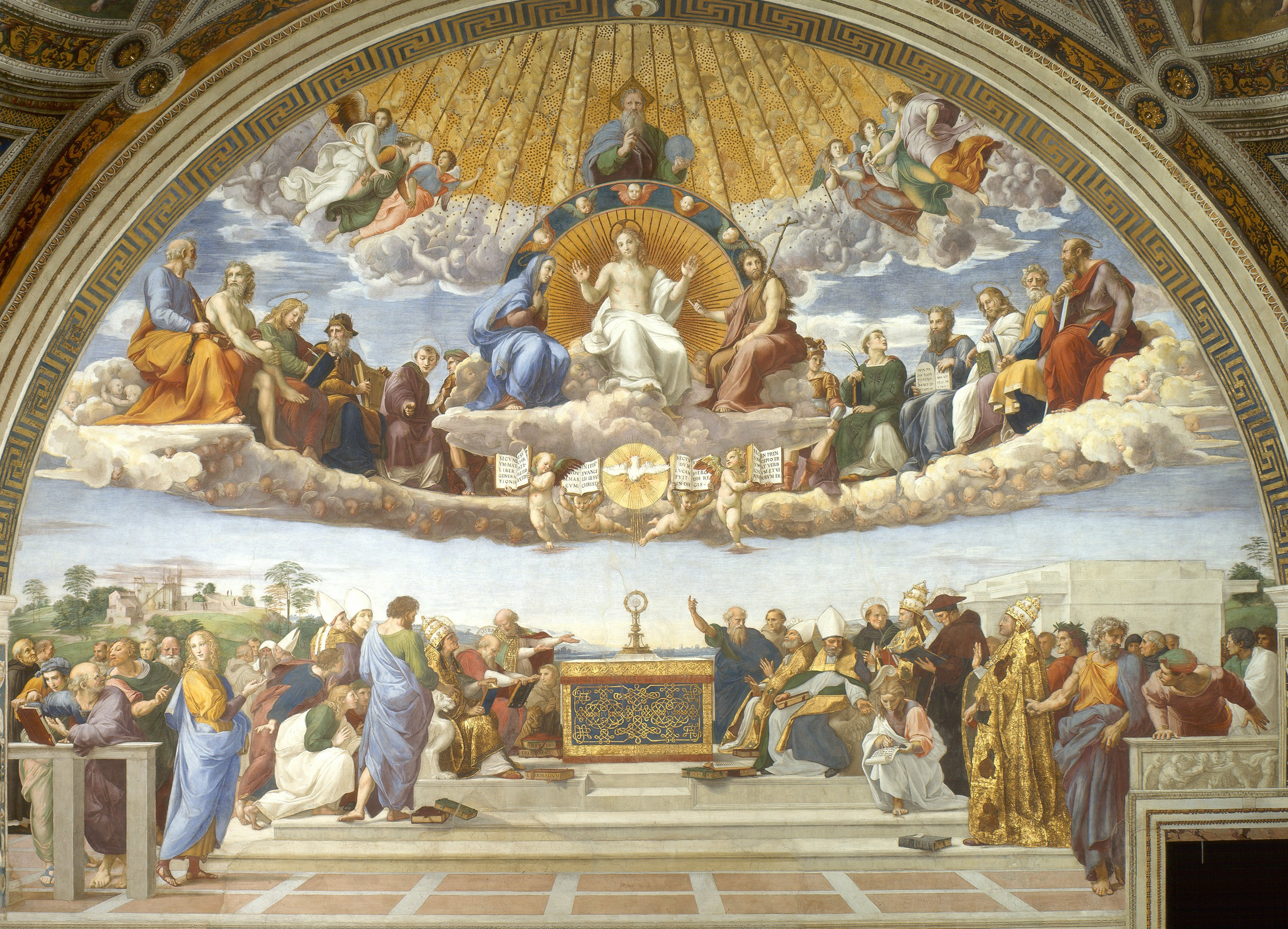
- Artist: Raphael
- Year: 1509–1510
- Type: Fresco
- Dimensions: 500 cm × 770 cm (200 in × 300 in)
- Location: Apostolic Palace, Vatican Museums, Vatican City

The Disputation of the Sacrament (Italian: La disputa del sacramento), or Disputa, is a painting by the Italian Renaissance artist Raphael. It was painted between 1509 and 1510 as the first part of Raphael's commission to decorate with frescoes the rooms that are now known as the Stanze di Raffaello, in the Apostolic Palace in the Vatican. At the time, this room was known as the Stanza della Segnatura, and was the private papal library where the supreme papal tribunal met.

== Description ==
In the painting, Raphael has created a scene spanning both heaven and earth. Above, Christ is surrounded by an aureole, flanked by the Blessed Virgin Mary and John the Baptist to his right and left (an arrangement known as the Deësis). Other various biblical figures such as Peter (far left, holding keys), Adam (far left, bared chest), John the Evangelist (left, writing), King David (left, holding lyre), Saint Lawrence (left, wearing purple), Judas Maccabeus (right, wearing gold armor), Stephen (right, wearing green), Moses (right, with horns of light and holding the Ten Commandments), James the Elder (right, wearing white), Abraham (right, holding knife), and Paul (far right, holding book and sword) are to the sides. God the Father sits above them all in the golden light of heaven and adored by angels, blessing with his right hand and holding the Earth in his left. Below Christ's feet is the Holy Spirit in the typical form of a dove, to whose sides are books of the four Gospels held open by putti.

Below, on an altar sits the monstrance. The fringe of the altar reads, "Julius II Pont. Max." The altar is flanked by historical theologians debating Transubstantiation (Christ's presence in the Eucharist). Among them are the original four Doctors of the Church (identified by their names inscribed into their halos), with Pope Gregory I and Jerome seated to the left of the altar and Augustine and Ambrose to the right, along with Pope Julius II, Pope Sixtus IV, Savonarola and Dante Alighieri. Pope Sixtus IV is the gold-dressed pope in the bottom of the painting. Directly behind Sixtus is Dante, wearing red and sporting a laurel wreath (symbolizing his greatness as a poet). Fifth from right, stands St. Thomas Aquinas. The monk on the far left is Fra Angelico. In the background on the left, a church is being constructed, representative of the Catholic Church.

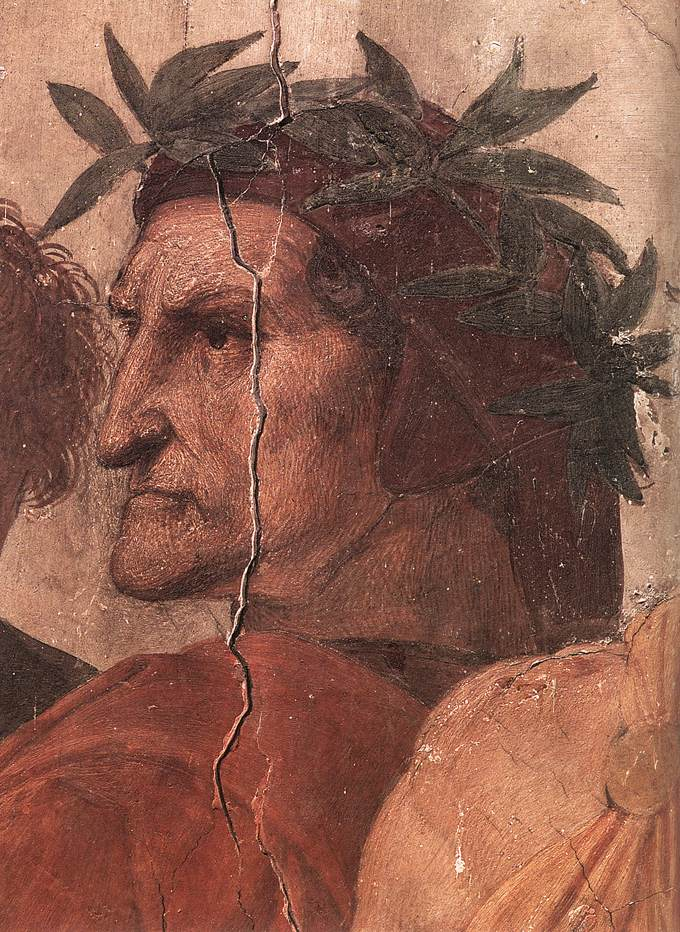
Dante Alighieri.

== See also ==
- List of paintings by Raphael

== Sources ==
- Schneider Adams, Laurie (2001). Italian Renaissance Art. Boulder: Westview Press. pp. 344–346.
