= List of works in the Louvre =

The following is a very incomplete list of notable works in the collections of the Musée du Louvre in Paris. For a list of works based on 5,500 paintings catalogued in the Joconde database, see the Catalog of paintings in the Louvre Museum.

Name	Image	Type	Creator	Ref.
The Seated Scribe		Sculpture (Egyptian)		
Venus de Milo		Sculpture (Greek)	Alexandros of Antioch	
Coronation of the Virgin			Fra Angelico	
Winged Victory of Samothrace		Sculpture (Greek)	Pythokritos (?)	
Apollo of Piombino		Sculpture (Greek)		
Diana of Versailles		Sculpture (Greek)		
Las Incantadas		Sculpture (Roman)		
Dying Slave		Sculpture	Michelangelo	
Virgin and Child from the Sainte-Chapelle		Sculpture (Ivory)		
Apollo Sauroctonos (Apollo Lizard-killer)		Sculpture (Roman)		
Marcellus as Hermes Logios		Sculpture (Roman)		
Ship of Fools		Painting	Hieronymus Bosch	
Portrait of a Princess		Painting	Pisanello	
Madonna della Vittoria		Painting	Andrea Mantegna	
Triumph of the Virtues		Painting	Andrea Mantegna	
St. Sebastian		Painting	Andrea Mantegna	
An Old Man and his Grandson		Painting	Domenico Ghirlandaio	
Pastoral Concert		Painting	Titian	
Madonna of the Rabbit		Painting	Titian	
Woman with a Mirror		Painting	Titian	
Venus and Cupid with a Satyr		Painting	Antonio da Correggio	
Susanna and the Elders		Painting	Tintoretto	
La Bella Nani		Painting	Paolo Veronese	
The Wedding at Cana		Painting	Paolo Veronese	
Death of the Virgin		Painting	Caravaggio	
Portrait of Alof de Wignacourt and his Page		Painting	Caravaggio	
The Fortune Teller		Painting	Caravaggio	
Ancient Rome (painting)		Painting	Giovanni Paolo Panini	
Charles I at the Hunt		Painting	Anthony van Dyck	
Oath of the Horatii		Painting	Jacques-Louis David	
The Coronation of Napoleon		Painting	Jacques-Louis David	
Bacchus		Painting	Leonardo da Vinci	
Mona Lisa		Painting	Leonardo da Vinci	
St. John the Baptist		Painting	Leonardo da Vinci	
Virgin of the Rocks		Painting	Leonardo da Vinci	
The Virgin and Child with St. Anne		Painting	Leonardo da Vinci	
La belle ferronnière		Painting	Leonardo da Vinci	
The Barque of Dante		Painting	Eugène Delacroix	
The Massacre at Chios		Painting	Eugène Delacroix	
Liberty Leading the People		Painting	Eugène Delacroix	
The Women of Algiers		Painting	Eugène Delacroix	
Death of Sardanapalus		Painting	Eugène Delacroix	
A Young Tiger Playing with its Mother		Painting	Eugène Delacroix	
Bonaparte Visiting the Plague Victims of Jaffa		Painting	Antoine-Jean Gros	
The Charging Chasseur		Painting	Théodore Géricault	
The Raft of the Medusa		Painting	Théodore Géricault	
Grande Odalisque		Painting	Jean Auguste Dominique Ingres	
Christ at the Column		Painting	Antonello da Messina	
La belle jardinière		Painting	Raphael	
Self-portrait with a friend		Painting	Raphael	
Saint George		Painting	Raphael	
St. Michael		Painting	Raphael	
St. Michael Vanquishing Satan		Painting	Raphael	
Portrait of Balthasar Castiglione		Painting	Raphael	
Marie de' Medici cycle		Painting	Peter Paul Rubens	
The Astronomer		Painting	Johannes Vermeer	
The Code of Hammurabi		Bas relief law code (Babylon)		
Mesha Stele		Basalt inscription		
Barberini ivory		Diptych (Byzantine)		
Dendera zodiac		Bas relief (Egyptian)		
The Exaltation of the Flower		Bas relief (Greek)		
Harbaville Triptych		Triptych in ivory (Byzantine)		
Borghese Vase		Krater (Greek)	Daniel Pincot	
Investiture of Zimrilim		Fresco (Mari, Syria)		

== See also ==
- Category:Collection of the Louvre
