= Hermes Logios type =

The Hermes Logios type is a type of statue of the Greek god Hermes, showing him in the form of Hermes Logios (Greek: Λόγιος, speaker).

It was first raised for the Athenian dead of the Battle of Coronea (447 BC). Examples possibly include:

- Hermes Ludovisi and its variation:
- Marcellus as Hermes Logios at the Louvre
