= Museums in Paris =

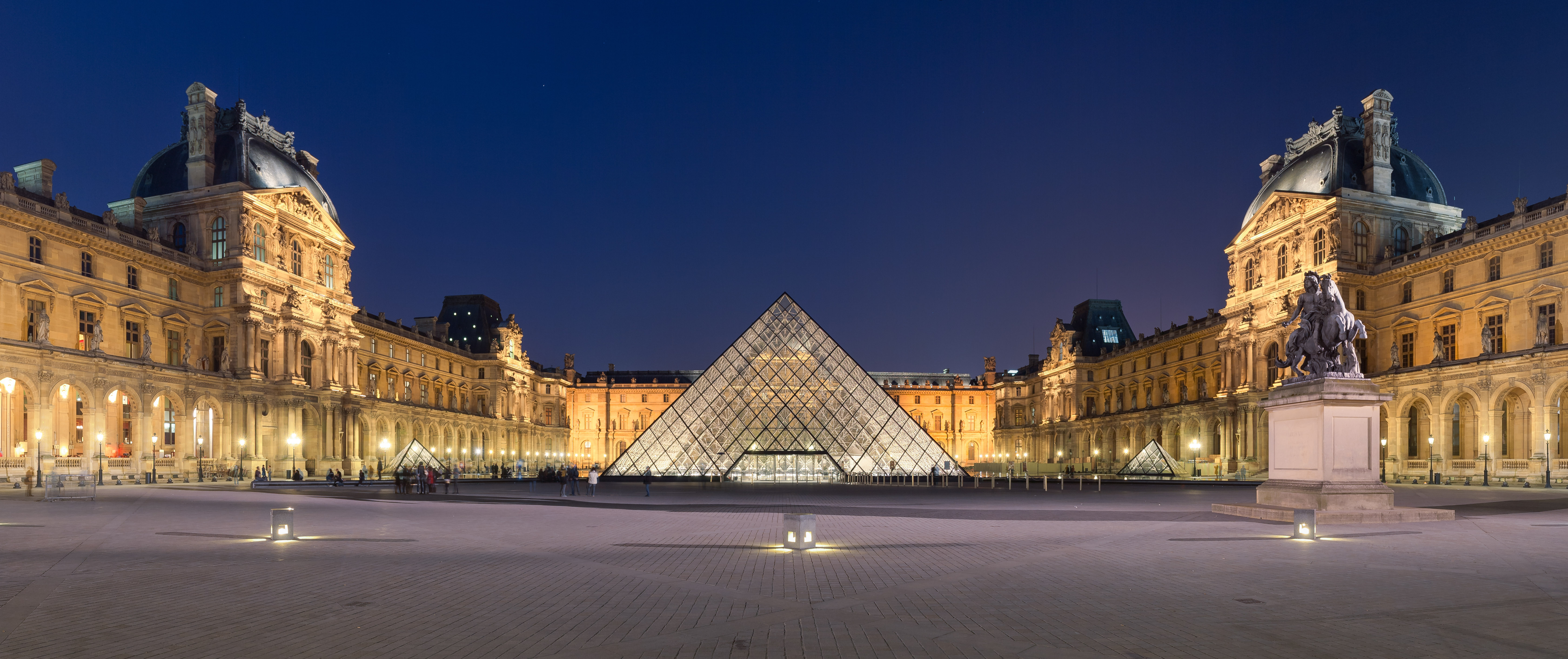

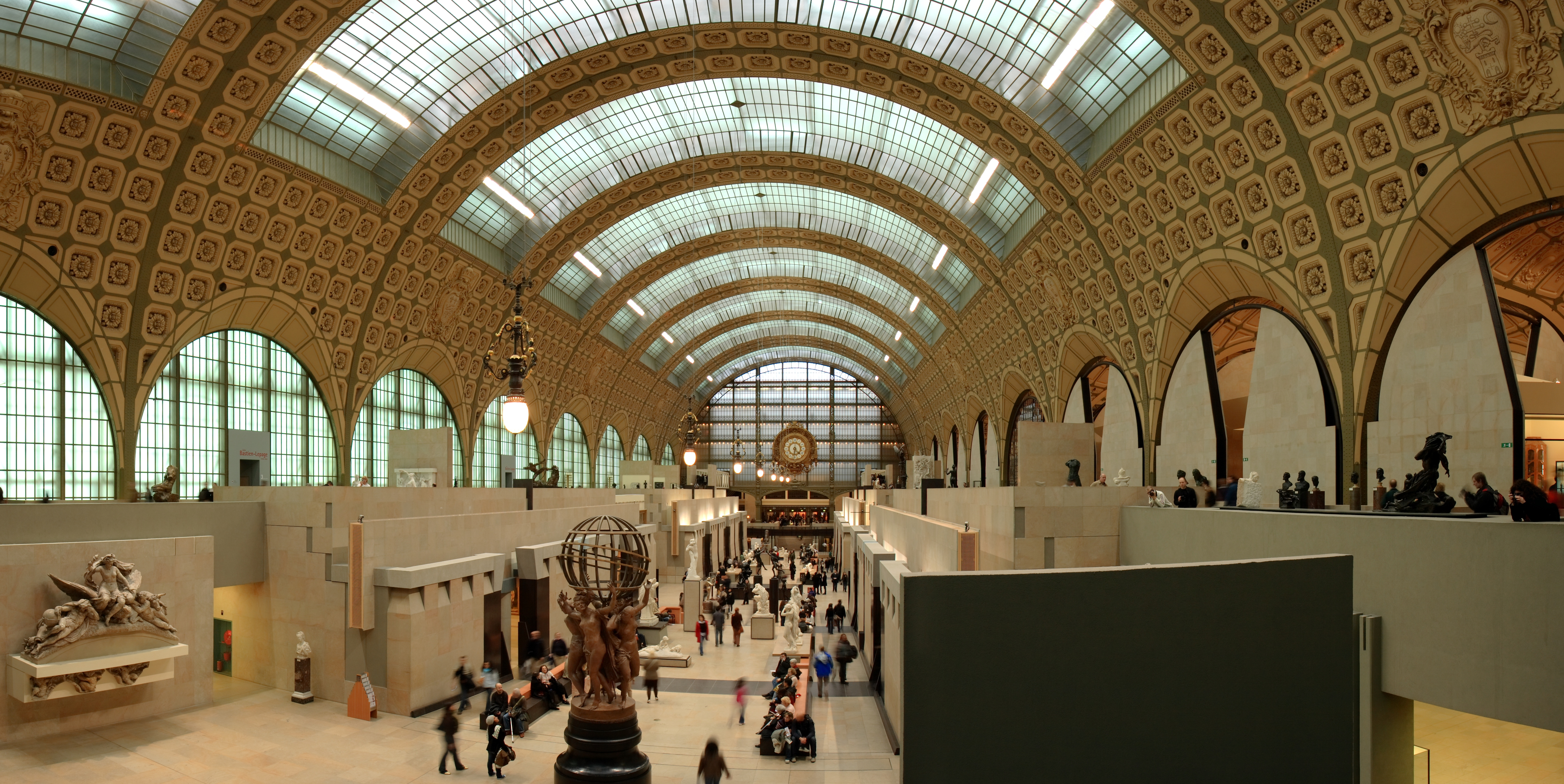
The Louvre (top) and the Musée d'Orsay (bottom), two renowned museums in Paris

The 136 museums in the city of Paris display many historical, scientific, and archeological artifacts from around the world, covering diverse and unique topics including fashion, theater, sports, cosmetics, and the culinary arts.

The first museums in Paris were established during the French Revolution as many royal properties became nationalised. In the late 19th and early 20th centuries, the Belle Époque period, a series of new museums were born in Paris, many of which came from personal collections donated by philanthropists. In recent decades, the city continues to build new museums. The Musée du quai Branly – Jacques Chirac, opened in 2006, is the latest large museum in Paris today.

Being a center of art for centuries, many works of famous artists, including Leonardo da Vinci, Raphael, Monet, Van Gogh, and Picasso, are stored in Paris. Museums such as the Louvre, the Orsay, and the Centre Pompidou are also valued as architectural works themselves. Many other small museums, like those dedicated to Rodin, Picasso or Jacquemart-André, also serve to preserve mansions built by ancient nobility. In addition to the regular gallery spaces, Paris' museums are also home to important art exhibitions. In 2008, Paris accounted for three of the 10 most visited museums in the world, of which the Louvre ranked first, on par with London and more than all other cities.

== History ==
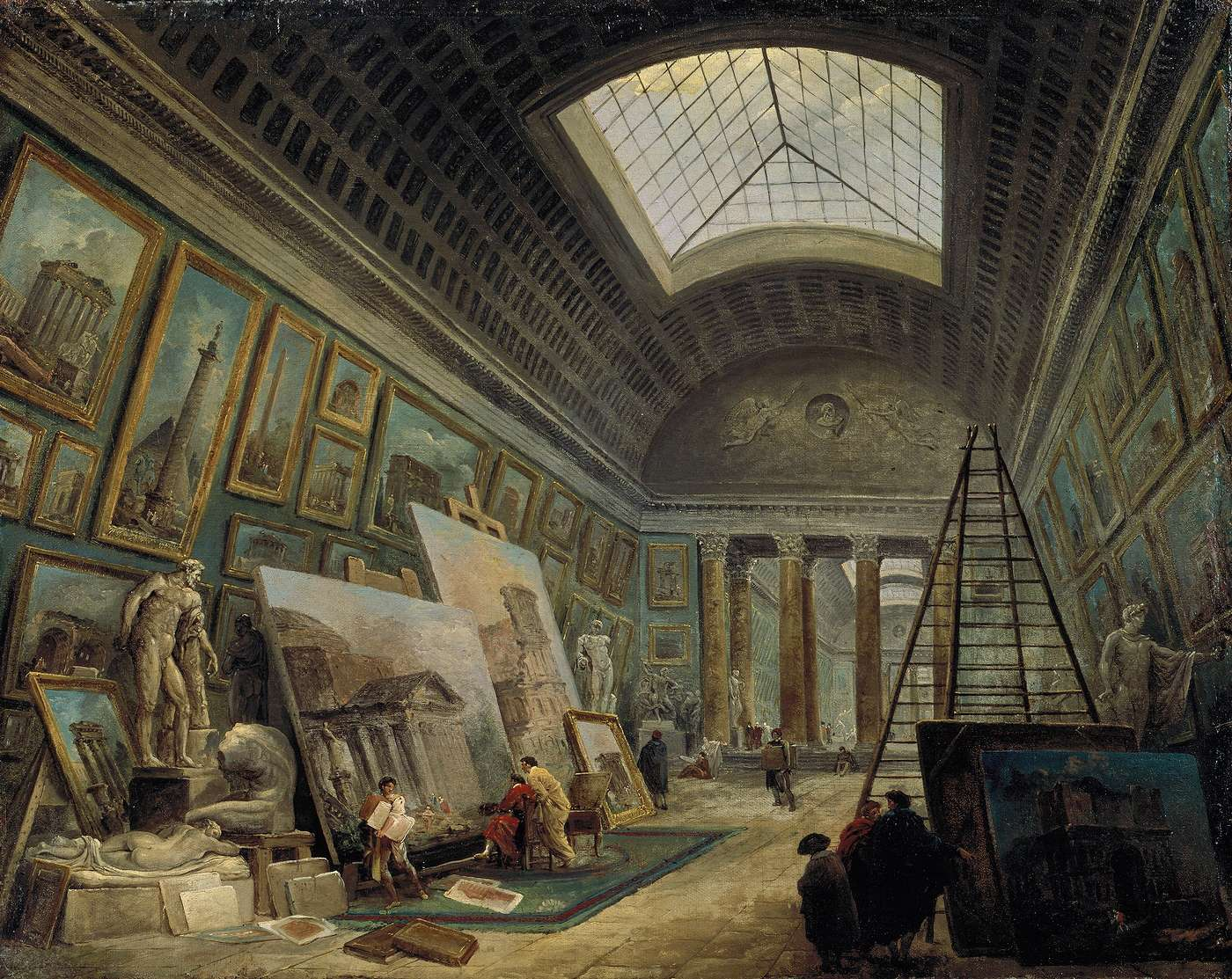
A gallery of the Louvre around the time it was established

During the Enlightenment, museums were established in several European countries. The Ashmolean Museum, opened in 1683 in Oxford, is considered the first public museum in history, in that anyone could access the exhibitions by paying the admission fee. The British Museum in London was founded in 1753 thanks to the collection of physicist Hans Sloane, and in 1759 was also open to the public. In Paris, from 1750 to 1779, an exhibition of the paintings in the royal collection was held at the Luxembourg Palace. The success of this event spurred the intention to build a permanent display, but this idea did not attain fruition until the French Revolution. It was not until August 10, 1793, the anniversary of the fall of the monarchy, that the Louvre Museum was open to the public to admire the collections previously belonging to the royal family. Following in the footsteps of the Louvre, the National Museum of Natural History was established that year as well. Later, the Musée des arts et métiers was opened in 1794 and Musée national des Monuments Français opened in 1795. In the early 19th century, when Napoleon conquered Europe, many valuable art and archeological collections were taken to French museums. After the fall of the First French Empire in 1814, many artifacts were returned to their former owners, while others remain in museums of Paris.

In the late 19th and early 20th centuries, Paris witnessed the birth of many new museums, including private ones. In 1882, based on the idea of "introducing" celebrities to the public, reporter Arthur Meyer and caricaturist Alfred Grévin created the Grévin wax museum. In 1889, the Guimet Museum opened with a collection of Asian art by industrialist Émile Guimet, who made many trips to China, India and Japan to collect artifacts. Other museums, such as the Jacquemart-André and Rodin were established around that time from personal collections donated by famous artists or donors. The first private museum in Paris, the Musée Carnavalet, focusing on the history of the city, opened in 1880. After the 1900 world exhibition, the Petit Palais became an art museum, displaying many works owned by the city of Paris. The early decades of the 20th century were also the time when Paris bought and was awarded many valuable art collections. In 1961, the Musée d'Art Moderne de Paris, located in the Palais de Tokyo, opened.

By the end of the 20th century, Paris had gained several new museums in quick succession due to the efforts of the presidents of the current Fifth Republic. This trend started with Georges Pompidou, who right from his inauguration decided to build a center for modern culture and art in the middle of ancient Paris. The Centre Pompidou was completed in 1977, after the death of Pompidou, named in honor of the late president. In the 1970s, a collection of 19th-century artworks were exhibited throughout the museums of France. The Impressionist paintings on display in the Jeu de Paume gallery gained worldwide recognition. In 1973, President Valéry Giscard d'Estaing decided to establish Musée d'Orsay to display European art made between the mid-19th and early-20th centuries. The old Orsay station on the banks of the Seine River was renovated, and at the end of 1986 the museum began to open to the public. In the same year, the Cité des Sciences et de l'Sndustrie Cité des sciences et de l'industrie was inaugurated on March 13 in La Villette park. With the Grand Louvre project beginning in 1981, François Mitterrand gave the Louvre a new face. When the Ministry of Finance was moved from the palace to Bercy, the entire palace was transferred to the museum, and the Marly, Puget and Khorsabad courtyards with glass roofs became the ideal display space for large works. The famous I. M. Pei designed Louvre Pyramid, located on the main courtyard, was inaugurated on March 30, 1989, and became the main entrance of the museum. In 1996, President Jacques Chirac decided to build a new museum in Paris for non-European civilizations after meeting art collector Jacques Kerchache. Although the project—which involved the transfer of most of the Musée de l'Homme's collection—faced strong opposition, the Musée du quai Branly was inaugurated on June 20, 2006, and quickly achieved success. Located on the banks of the Seine, in a building designed by architect Jean Nouvel, the museum welcomed nearly 1.4 million visitors annually in 2008, becoming one of Paris's most attractive tourist destinations.

== Museums ==
=== National museums ===
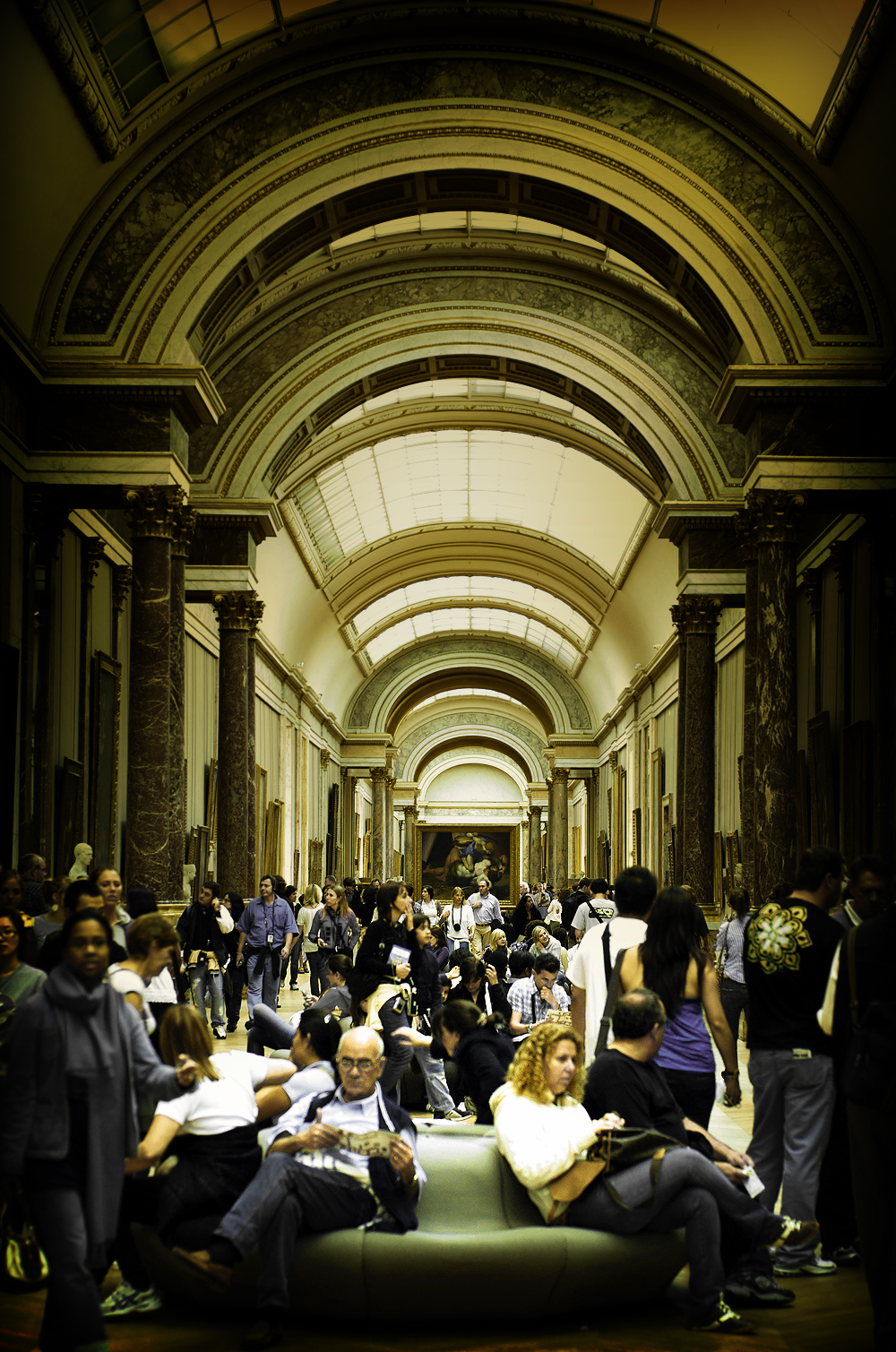
Visitors in the Louvre

The Réunion des Musées Nationaux (National Museum Association), founded in 1895, is responsible for enriching the national collection, welcoming the public and organizing exhibitions. Under the auspices of the Ministry of Culture, it has 34 museums throughout France as members, including 14 museums in Paris and 7 other museums in the remaining provinces of the Île-de-France region. The artifact collection of these "national museums" covers many historical periods and geographical locations in various fields.

In Paris, artifacts of Asia are on display at the Guimet Museum in the city's 16th arrondissement. Despite its origins as a personal collection, Guimet is currently the most important Asian art museum in the West. It holds thousands of pieces of Chinese, Japanese and Korean art, along with many valuable collections from India as well as the countries of Central and Southeast Asia. Housed in two special buildings, the ancient Roman public bath and the Cluny mansion, the Musée de Cluny possesses artifacts covering European history from the end of the Roman Empire through the Middle Ages. The museum's collection of sculptures, carpets, textiles, ivory, stained glass and other artefacts offers panoramic views and details of the daily life of European residents of the period. In the city center, the Louvre is not only one of the most important museums in Paris but is also among the most well-known museums in the world. In the former palace, there are now a variety of works from ancient civilizations, Islamic art, and European art from the 13th to the mid-19th centuries. The palace itself is a commemorated work of architecture and is a definitive symbol of Paris. The Musée d'Orsay and Musée de l'Orangerie đare devoted to the next age of Western art from the mid-19th century to the early 20th century. Although only established in 1986, the Orsay Museum is now in the number of art museums attracts the most thanks to the famous paintings of two Impressionist and Post-Impressionist schools. Located in the 8th arrondissement next to the Champs-Elysées, the Grand Palais was built on the occasion of the 1900 world exhibition. With a total area of 72 thousand square meters, the work is dedicated to the Palais de la Découverte science museum, with two galleries: La Nef and the Galeries nationales, the latter of which is also a "national museum". The Galeries nationales has an exhibition space larger than 5 thousand square meters, often hosting large exhibitions collaborating with many important museums both in France and around the world. In addition to the major museums, the association also manages a number of small museums dedicated to famous artists, such as the Musée Picasso in Le Marais displaying works by artist Pablo Picasso, and the Musée Rodin in the 7th arrondissement showing the sculptures of Auguste Rodin. Member museums of the association have free admission on the first Sunday of each month. Visitors under the age of 18, art history students, teachers and journalists also do not have to buy tickets to visit the museum.

Paris also has other national museums that are not part of the association. Located in the Jardin des plantes of the 5th arrondissement, The Nation Museum of Natural History, established in the late 18th century, is now a grand établissement of the Ministry of Education, Ministry of Research and the Ministry of Environment. It houses one of the largest collections in the world, alongside the Smithsonian in Washington, D.C. and the British Museum in London. The Centre Pompidou also reserved floors 5 and 6 for the Musée National d'Art Moderne, containing nearly 60,000 modern and contemporary works. Inside the "High-tech" building, there are two libraries, movie rooms, performance rooms and exhibition spaces.

Located in the Palais de Chaillot, not far from the Eiffel Tower, the Musée national de la Marine is considered one of the first maritime museums in the world, along with the Naval Museum in Saint Peterburg. The artifacts of the museum, originally from the personal collection of Louis XV, has become especially diverse with many models of boats, pictures, weapons, books, and maritime instruments. Belonging to the French Ministry of Defense, the museum also has branches in Brest, Port-Louis, Rochefort, Toulon and Saint-Tropez.

=== City museums ===
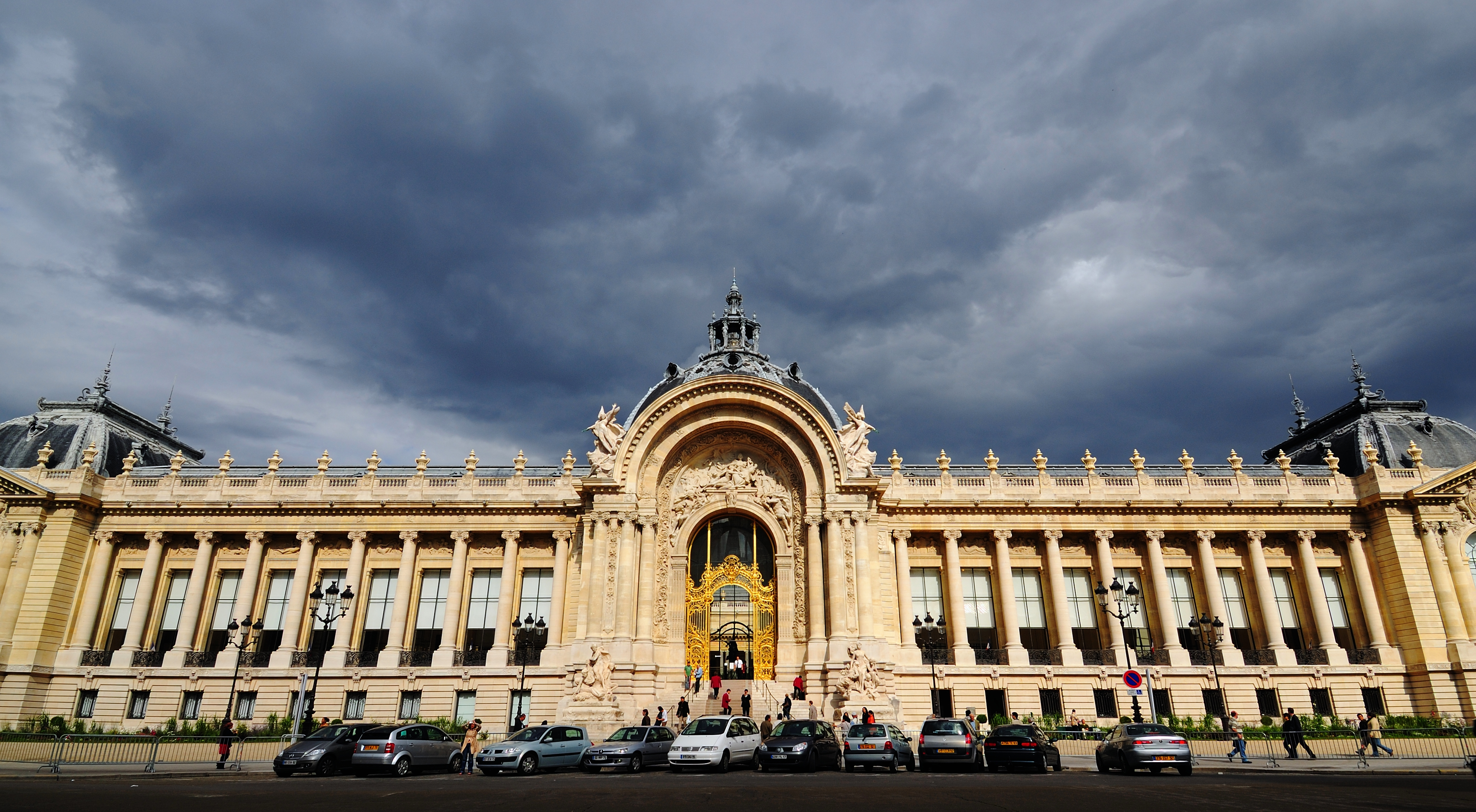
Petit Palais, a museum owned by the city dedicated to the fine arts

The city of Paris currently manages 14 museums and display venues. Except for the Catacombs of Paris, the archaeological site of the Notre-Dame cathedral and the exhibition spaces, all the city's museums do not charge the public for admission. Unlike the national museums, the museum system of Paris does not own encyclopedic collections but mainly reflects the city's history in many different aspects and angles. Museums such as the Carnavalet, Jean Moulin and the catacombs provide a direct view of the history of Paris, while the former residences of Victor Hugo, Honoré de Balzac and George Sand showcase the lives of these prominent city residents. Through the history of Paris, there were many aristocrats or wealthy merchants passionate about collecting works of art. Many of these collections have been donated to the city and are now displayed at museums such as the Cernuschi and Cognacq-Jay, partly reflecting the life and society in Paris centuries ago. The artifacts owned by the city of Paris can be divided into four collections: fine arts, fine arts and clothing, archeology and history, and finally artifacts.

The Petit Palais, or the Fine Arts Museum of Paris, is located on the avenue Winston Churchill, opposite the Grand Palais. Built on the occasion of the 1900 world exhibition, Petit Palais officially became the city's art museum in 1902. The collection of Petit Palais includes many priceless artifacts, from paintings and sculptures to pottery, carpets, and ivory. The museum space is divided into two separate parts: one on the Champs-Élysées for permanent exhibits, and another on the opposite side nest to the Seine for temporary exhibitions. The works on display cover many periods, from ancient Greece to the 20th century, including many works by master artists such as Rembrandt, Delacroix, Monet and Cézanne. In the 16th arrondissement's Palais de Tokyo, the Musée d'Art Moderne de Paris is an important venue for modern art. It hosts more than 8,000 works, covering most of the 20th century's artistic movements. In 2008, the museum welcomed nearly 3 million visitors, ranking eighth among the most visited museums in the world. The Parisian collection of fashion artifacts is mainly kept at the Palais Galliera in the same arrondissement. The museum building, which was originally the home of the Duchess of Galliera, has been open to the general public since 1977. Without regular display spaces, the Galliera only hosts exhibits, showcasing part of a collection of 90,000 artifacts, including many luxurious costumes of the 18th and 19th centuries.

Paris' historical "memorabilia" is entrusted to the Musée Carnavalet, located in two mansions in the 3rd arrondissement—the Hôtel Le Pelletier de Saint-Fargeau and the Hôtel Carnavalet. The Carnavalet Museum displays the current diverse objects in over 100 rooms, putting on show the history of the city from prehistoric times to the present day. The museum's collection consists of about 600,000 artifacts, including 40,000 archaeological artifacts related to the history of Paris, 2,600 paintings, 475,000 paintings, and 3,600 sculptures, along with various models, coins, handicrafts, and other objects. In particular, the museum stores many valuable artifacts related to the French Revolution. A special place of Paris that often attracts visitors is the catacombs, with the entrance to Place Denfert-Rochereau in the 14th arrondissement. Originally an old mine, the Catacombs of Paris formed in 1786 when the corpses previously in Holy Innocents' Cemetery were moved here. By 1814, the catacombs were accepting the excess corpses from all other cemeteries of the city. Although not the homeland of Victor Hugo and Balzac, Paris is the city where these two writers are attached and also the inspiration for many of their works. Their houses, the Maison de Balzac in Passy and the Maison de Victor Hugo in Vosges have been a place where writers lived for many years, and still retain a lot of their memories. Together with the Musée de la Vie Romantique, which was often visited by George Sand in her lifetime, they receive a large number of literary enthusiasts every year.

=== Other museums ===
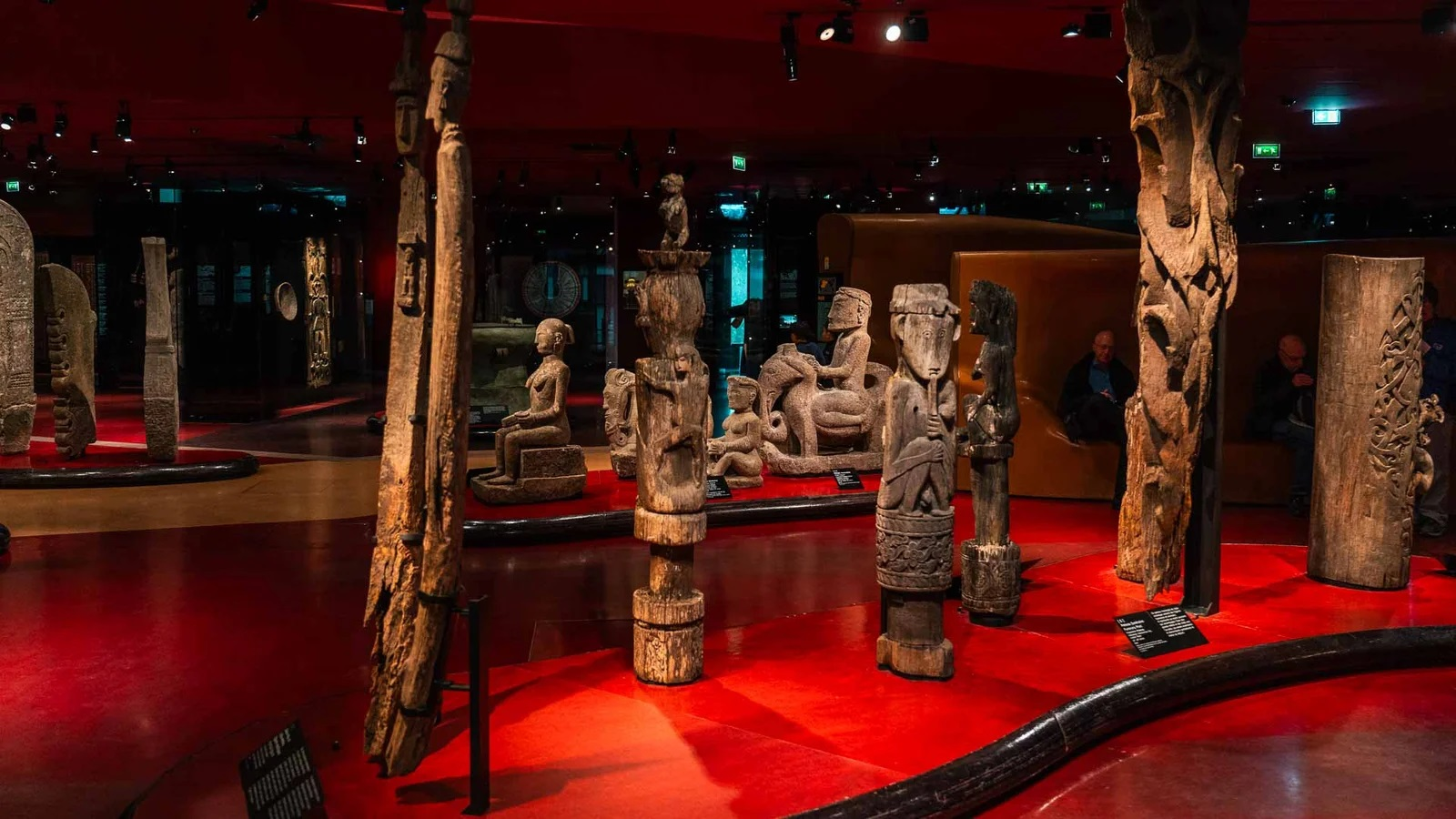
View of the permanent exhibition room at the Musée du quai Branly – Jacques Chirac in Paris.

In addition to the national and city museums, there are also many other important museums owned by Paris along with a rich system of private museums. In the Parc de la Villette of the 19th arrondissement, the Cité des Sciences et de l'Industrie is one of Paris's most popular destinations with about 3 million visitors each year. The 150,000-square-meter building, dedicated to spreading scientific and technical knowledge to the public, especially youth, is now one of Europe's largest science museums. In the same park is located the Cité de la musique, where many collections of valuable musical instruments are stored. The Musée du quai Branly, opened in 2006, the only large museum of the city established since the Musée d'Orsay opened in 1986. The building has modern architecture located along the banks of the Seine River, not far from the Eiffel Tower, and has 300,000 artifacts from civilizations in Asia, Africa, Australia and the Americas. Although opened relatively recently, Quai Branly has become one of the most important museums in Paris and ranked 31st among the most visited museums in the world with 1,389,000 visitors in 2008. Les Invalides in the 7th arrondissement is famous for its beauty as well as for being the resting place of Emperor Napoleon. The palace is also the home of the Army Museum and the Musée des Plans-Reliefs. Under the management of the Ministry of Armed Forces, the Army Museum covers an area of 8,000 square meters, displaying 500 thousand artifacts including paintings, photographs, medals, artillery, and guns, making it one of France's most important museums of military history. One of Paris' leading foreign cultural centers is the Arab World Institute in the 5th arrondissement. Located on the banks of the Seine, this multifunctional building reserves floors 5, 7 and 8 for the Arab and Islamic Cultural Museum, displaying the civilization and art of the Arab world from the pre-Islamic era to this day. Another important science museum of Paris is the Musée des arts et métiers, located in the heart of the 3rd arrondissement. Opened in 1794, it currently holds 80,000 artifacts and 20,000 drawings, illustrating the steps of science and technology, and also includes many valuable artifacts, such as the gasometer of Antoine Lavoisier, the Lumière brothers' film projector, Alessandro Volta's battery and the steam engine of James Watt.

The private museum with the highest popularity in Paris is by far the Musée Grévin, the wax museum which is located at 10 Avenue Montmartre. The museum displays about 300 wax figures of famous figures, from Albert Einstein and La Fontaine to Zinedine Zidane, Michael Jackson and Lucky Luke. In 2007, Grévin welcomed 762,000 visitors, ranking 14th in the most visited places in Paris, surpassing other major museums like Carnavalet or Guimet. The Musée Jacquemart-André exhibits the art collection of politician Edouard André and his wife, painter Nélie Jacquemart. Before his death in 1912, Nélie Jacquemart handed down the mansion on Haussmann Boulevard and all the works that the couple had donated to the Institut de France to set up a new museum. Opened in 1913, the Jacquemart-André Museum is now under the management of Culturespaces. It exhibits many paintings of famous artists such as Botticelli, Rembrandt, Anthony van Dyck, and Jacques-Louis David along with many pieces of valuable furniture and fine art. Another famous private art museum is Musée Maillol, located on Grenelle Street in the 7th arrondissement. Named after sculptor Aristide Maillol, he museum was founded in 1995 thanks to Dina Vierny, a model who was once very attached to Maillol. In the collection of the museum, besides the works of Aristide Maillol, the art of Henri Matisse, Pablo Picasso, Paul Cézanne, Wassily Kandinsky, and other artists on display. With a total area of 4,250 square meters, the museum also hosts regular exhibitions for modern art.

== Exhibitions ==
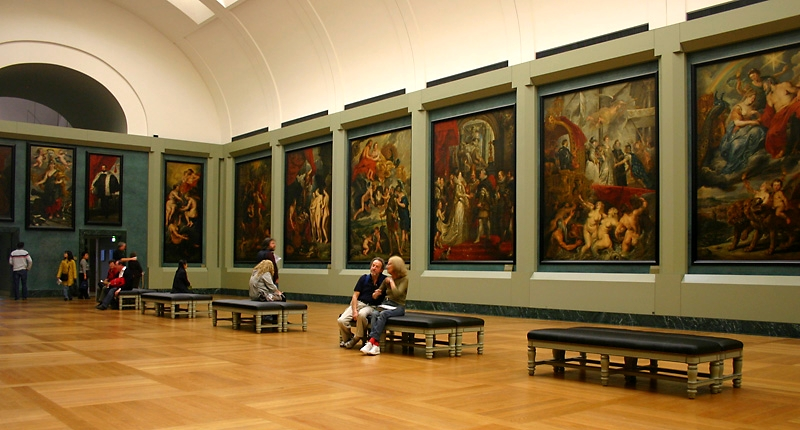
An exhibition at the Louvre

Along with cities like Tokyo and New York, Paris is one of the largest centers for exhibition activities. These cultural events are an opportunity for the public to discover many valuable collections of Paris and other cities through collaborative programs with their museums. In 2007, at 19 major cultural venues of the city, there were more than 80 exhibitions opened to the public, attracting more than 9 million visitors. The city's major museums sand and exhibition centers such as the Grand Palais, Jeu de Paume and the Centre Pompidou draw many attendees. Paris City Hall, Luxembourg Museum - the small museum in the garden of the same name - and Pinacothèque are also among the most attractive exhibition spaces. Many Paris exhibits are also held outdoors, with public display spaces such as the Champs-Élysées, the banks of the Seine or the Champ-de-Mars. Montmartre, Saint-Germain-des-Prés and Le Marais, known for being artist neighborhoods, feature many art galleries.

The most common topic of major Parisian exhibitions is art of many different types. In recent years, many "retrospective" exhibits are devoted to 19th and 20th century French artists, such as Paul Cézanne, Gustave Courbet, Paul Gauguin and Claude Monet. In 2007, 34 major exhibitions in Paris had an average lifespan of 4 months, with the 10 most popular exhibitions lasted 5 months on average. At the Grand Palais, in 2008, the Galeries nationales exhibition space was open for 12.5% of the day. However, during the exhibition Picasso et les maîtres (Picasso with the masters) from October 2008 to February 2009, the number of opening hours up to 31%, usually from 9 am to 10 pm. At the end of this exhibition, the Grand Palais was open for 83 consecutive hours, welcoming 33,000 visitors at night. Another feature often found in successful exhibits in Paris is the large number of exhibits on display. In the two exhibitions L’atelier d’Alberto Giacometti (Sculpture Workshop of Alberto Giacometti) at the Pompidou Center from October 2007 to February 2008, and Trésors engloutis d’Egypte (Egyptian Treasures) at the Grand Palais from December 2006 to August 2007, about 500 to 600 works were shown to the public.

In the 10 most successful exhibitions in Paris in 2007, 5 of them attracted more than 400 thousand visitors each. The remaining exhibitions welcomed about 300 to 400 thousand visitors each. Trésors engloutis d’Egypte, held in the Grand Palais' La Nef display spacem welcomed 730,000 visitors over a three-month period. In 2008, the exhibition Dans la nuit, des images (In the night, images), held from December 18 to 31 at the Grand Palais attracted 145,000 visitors, an average of 10,357 visitors per day, with only two Japanese exhibitions held in Tokyo and Nara having more attendees that year.

== Visitor statistics ==
With their collections of valuable artifacts and location in the "capital of light", the museums of Paris annually attract a large number of visitors, of which a significant part are foreign tourists. In 2007, 50 of Paris's main tourist destinations were visited by more than 70 million people, with most of them being museums. Ranked third on the list, the Louvre Museum with 8,260,000 visitors is the most visited location in the city that charges admission. Only two free attractions surpassed it: the famous Catholic churches of Sacré-Coeur and Notre-Dame. The Pompidou Cultural Center, including the Museum of Modern Art, the library and exhibition spaces, welcomed 5,509,425 visitors, taking fifth place, following the Eiffel Tower. Quai Branly Museum, which has only been open since mid-2006, also had 1,379,623 visitors in 2007. Among the museums managed by the city of Paris, which is free to open, Petit Palais is the collection point. most attractive, followed by the Carnavalet Museum and the City Museum of Modern Art. The Grévin Museum, which welcomed 762,000 visitors in 2007, continues to rank as the top private museum by admissions.

In 2008, according to The Art Newspaper, Paris accounted for 3 of the 10 most-visited museums in the world: the Louvre, Orsay and the Museum of Modern Art. In addition, the Centre Pompidou held 12th place. In the first place, the Louvre welcomed 8.5 million visitors, much more than next highest, the British Museum, even though it does not charge for admission unlike the Louvre. Paris' Musée National d'Art Moderne occupies the 8th place with 2,981,000 visitors, more than many famous museums such as New York City's Museum of Modern Art, Madrid's Prado Museum, and the Hermitage Museum in Saint Petersburg. For specific exhibitions, although Japanese cities dominate the top spots, the gallery Dans la nuit, des images, held at the Grand Palais in late 2008, ranked third among the most attractive exhibitions by the average number of visitors per day. The gallery exhibition of the Picasso Museum, held in Reina Sofía, Madrid, also welcomed 547,810 visitors, ranked sixth among the most-visited exhibitions in the world in 2008.

Most visited museums in Paris

Name	2006	2007
Louvre	8,348,000	8.260.000
Centre Pompidou	5,133,506	5,509,425
Orsay	3,009,203	3,.166,509
Cité des Sciences et de l'Industrie	3,055,000	3,030,628
Quai Branly	952.770	1.379.623
National Museum of Natural History	1.344.344	1.372.804
Les Invalides	1.130.841	1.188.728
Grévin	682,000	762,000
Arab World Institute	822.285	724.805
Rodin	621.513	700.001
Orangerie	447.093	598.762
Petit Palais	787.418	576.339
Palais de la découverte	625.383	500.000
Carnavalet	441.193	485.295
Picasso	470.500	501.060
Musée de la Mode et du Textile	288.179	421.373
Conciergerie	368.013	415.225
Musée d'Art Moderne de Paris	775.581	385.887
Guimet	246.208	309.509

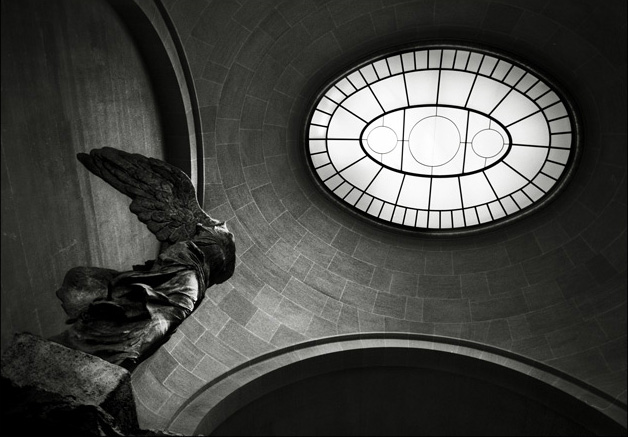
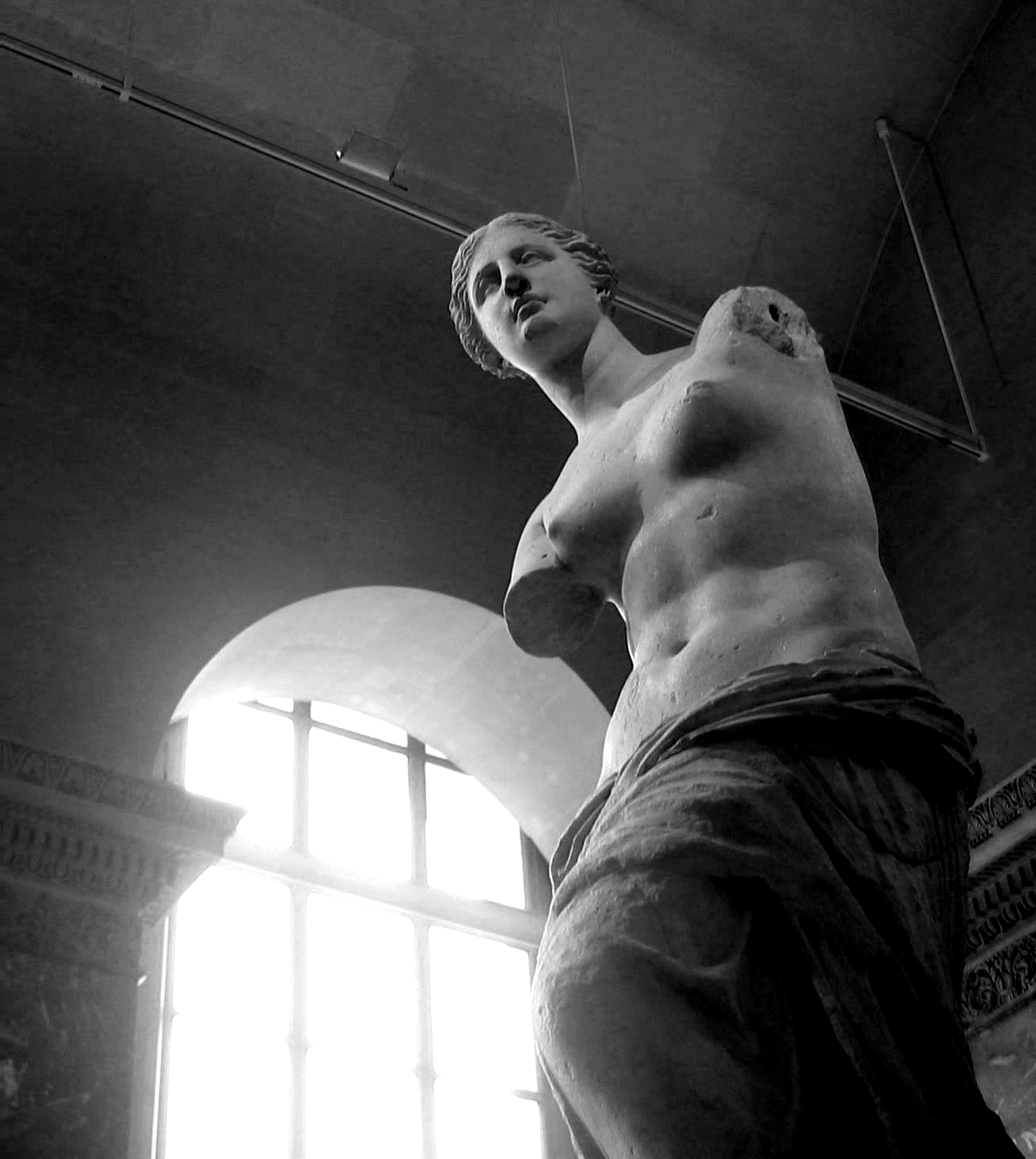
Winged Victory of Samothrace Venus de Milo

Name	2006	2007
Cluny	289.360	293.975
Catacombs of Paris	237.309	258.421
Jacquemart-André	180.000	243.400
Maillol	270.000	220.000
Musée des arts et métiers	184.484	183.000
Musée de l'Homme	165.417	154.273
Musée national de la Marine	103.957	153.782
Archives Nationales	132.113	143.827
Maison de Victor Hugo	126.785	128.829
Musée d'Art et d'Histoire du Judaïsme	91.806	125.579
Espace Dalí	110.000	120.000
Musée des Plans-Reliefs	103.294	95.362
Musée des Égouts	83.395	94.999
Galliera	41.000	75.724
Musée de la Poste	61.485	67.092
Musée de la Vie Romantique	71.577	62.000
Cernuschi	103.017	49.453
Bourdelle	41.729	46.656
Musée du Vin	40.000	40.000

Source: Paris Tourism Office.

== See also ==
- List of museums in Paris
- Tourism in Paris
