= Saint George (Raphael, Louvre) =

Painting by Raphael

Saint George and the Dragon
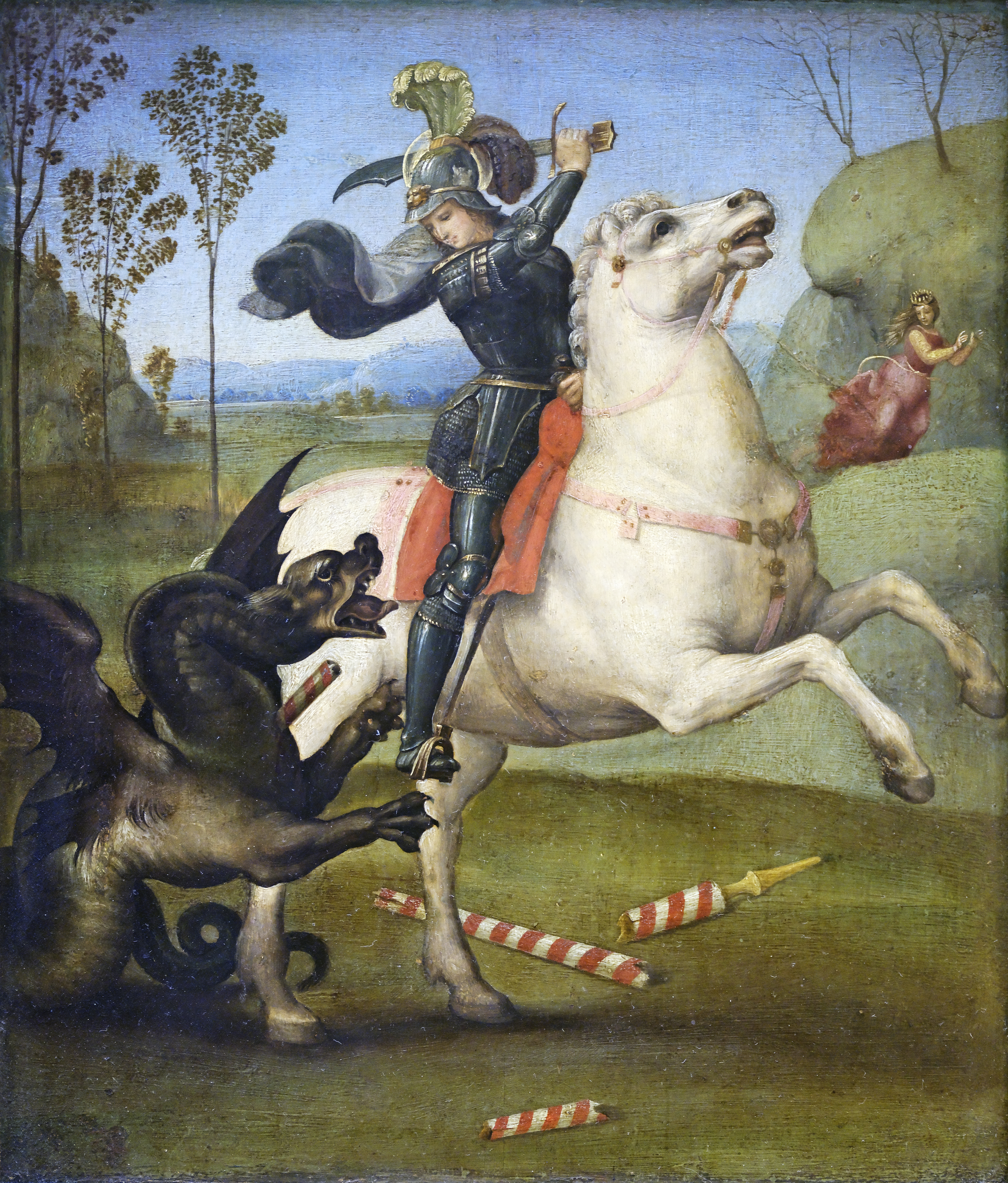
- Artist: Raphael
- Year: c. 1503–1505
- Medium: Oil on wood
- Dimensions: 31 cm × 27 cm (12 in × 11 in)
- Location: Louvre, Paris

Saint George or Saint George and the Dragon is a small painting by the Italian Renaissance artist Raphael, executed c. 1503–1505. It is housed in the Louvre in Paris. A later version of the same subject is the Saint George and the Dragon in the National Gallery of Art in Washington, D.C.

== History ==
This painting and the equally small Saint Michael, also in the Louvre, are a pair. In the Mazarin Collection they were joined together, forming a diptych, and bound in leather. Louis XIV acquired them from Cardinal Mazarin's heirs in 1661.

The Saint George has sometimes been ascribed to the artist's Roman period, because the horse resembles one of the horses of Monte Cavallo (the Quirinal Palace). However, Raphael could easily have known this particular horse from a drawing of it, done by one of Leonardo's pupils. To judge by the still somewhat naïve and Peruginesque style of the painting, it is really one of Raphael's early works, dating from about 1504. He produced another painting of the same subject a little later (the aforementioned panel in Washington D.C.), and towards the end of his life he painted a large Saint Michael which is also in the Louvre.

Giovanni Lomazzo, in his Trattato della Pittura (1584), mentions a Saint George by Raphael, commissioned by Guidobaldo da Montefeltro, Duke of Urbino, which was painted on a "little chess-board" (tavoliere). According to the old catalogues the small Saint Michael, if not the Saint George as well, had a draughts-board on the back which is now covered over. Examination by means of X-rays and infrared has not confirmed this statement. In the abovementioned book, Lomazzo seems to have confused various pictures of the same subject. If one can rely to some extent on his late and somewhat muddled testimony, it is possible that the two paintings in the Louvre were painted for the Duke of Urbino.

== See also ==
- List of paintings by Raphael
