= La Bella Nani =

Painting by Paolo Veronese

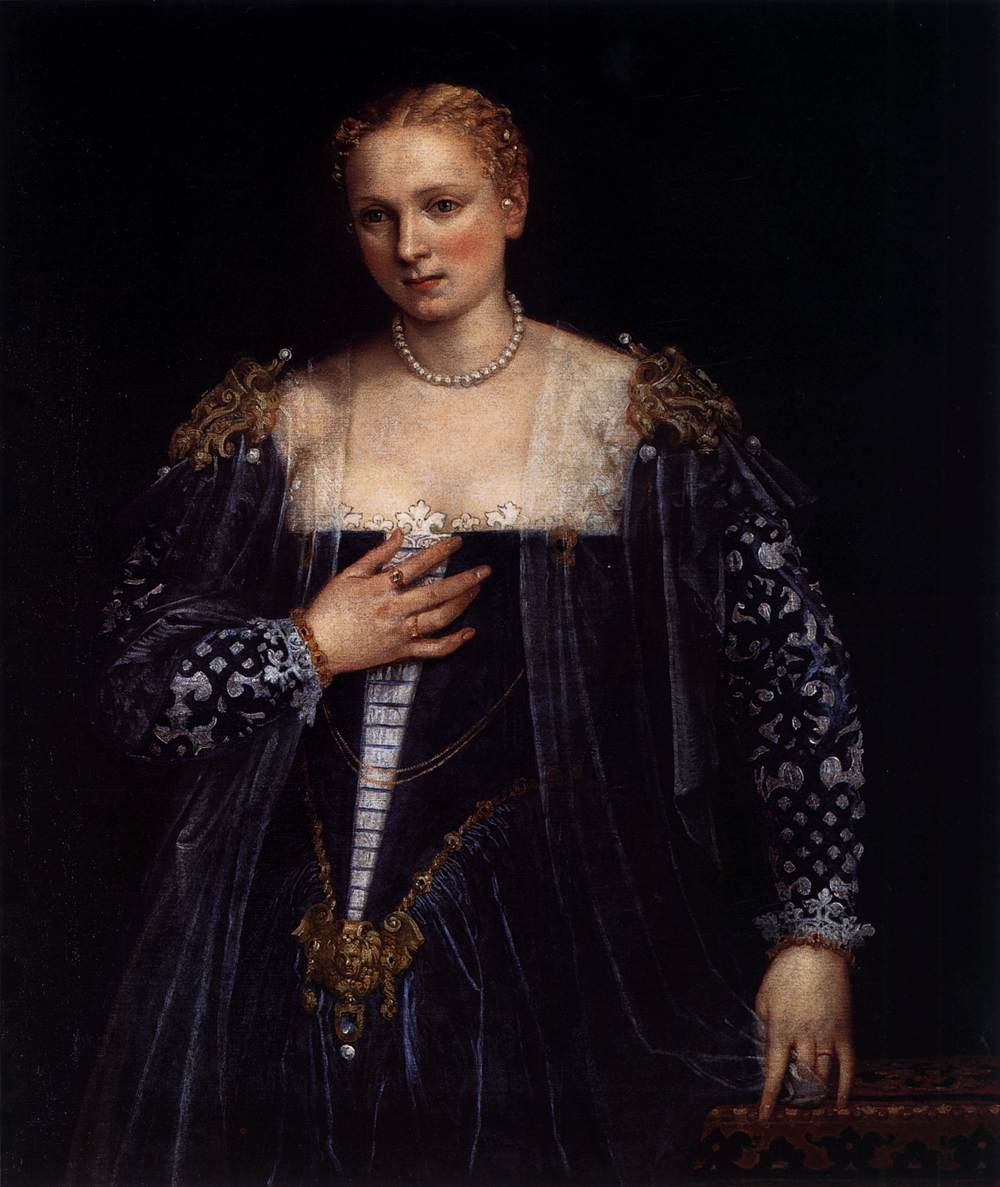
- Artist: Paolo Veronese
- Year: c. 1560
- Medium: oil on canvas
- Dimensions: 119 cm × 103 cm (3.90 ft × 3.38 ft)
- Location: Louvre, Paris

La Bella Nani, also known as Portrait of a Venetian Woman, is an oil painting on canvas depicting a wealthy noblewoman, painted by Paolo Veronese, c. 1560. The painting is in the Louvre, in Paris, and on display in Room 711 in the Denon Wing.

== Description ==
The painting depicts a woman, at half-bust, who wears a fancy dress typical of the wealthy fashion of Venice at the time, especially the wide neckline and rich ornaments. The reserved attitude of the sitter and the ring on her left hand indicate that she is a married woman. Her identity is unknown. The name of Nani came from the family that once supposedly owned the painting, and because of that it was thought that the subject was their member. The work is considered one of the most beautiful female portraits of the 16th century. Veronese rarely portrayed women, only six of these portraits are known.

== Cultural references ==
The painting was included by the French historian Paul Veyne in his book dedicated to Italian painting, Mon musée imaginaire, ou les chefs-d'œuvre de la peinture italienne (2010).
