= Saint Michael (Raphael) =

Painting by Raphael

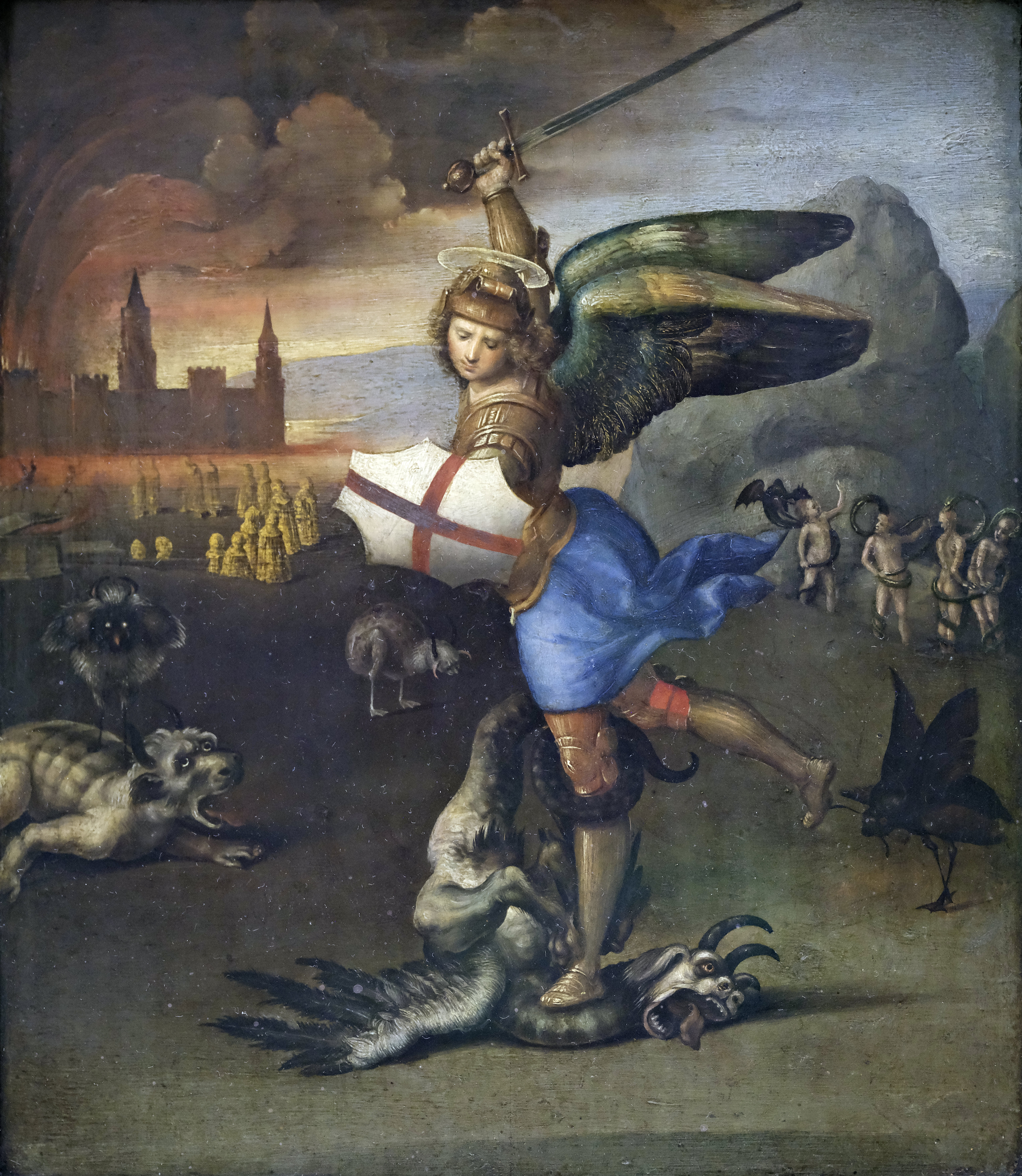
- Artist: Raphael
- Year: c. 1504–1505
- Medium: Oil on wood
- Dimensions: 30 cm × 26 cm (12 in × 10 in)
- Location: Louvre, Paris

Saint Michael is an oil painting by the Italian artist Raphael. Also called the Little Saint Michael to distinguish it from a larger, later treatment of the same theme, Saint Michael Vanquishing Satan, it is now in the Louvre in Paris. The work depicts the Archangel Michael in combat with the demons of Hell, while the damned suffer behind him. Together with the Saint George, it represents the first of Raphael's works on martial subjects.

== History ==
An early work of the artist, the painting was executed for Guidobaldo da Montefeltro, Duke of Urbino, in 1504 or 1505 on the back of a draughtboard, possibly commissioned to express appreciation to Louis XII of France for conferring the Order of Saint Michael on Francesco Maria I della Rovere, Guidobaldo's nephew and heir. Whatever the impetus for its creation, by 1548 it hung in the collection at the Palace of Fontainebleau.

In her 2006 study Early Work of Raphael, Julia Cartwright suggests that the work may betray the influence of Timoteo Viti in the gold tinting to the green wings of Michael, while the sinners in the background suggest that Raphael may have consulted an illustrated volume of Dante's Inferno. The punishments depicted reflect Dante's treatment of hypocrites and thieves.

A little more than a decade after completing the little Saint Michael, Raphael was commissioned to revisit the theme, producing Saint Michael Vanquishing Satan for Pope Leo X in 1518.

== See also ==
- List of paintings by Raphael
