= Marcellus as Hermes Logios =

Sculpture by Cleomenes the Athenian

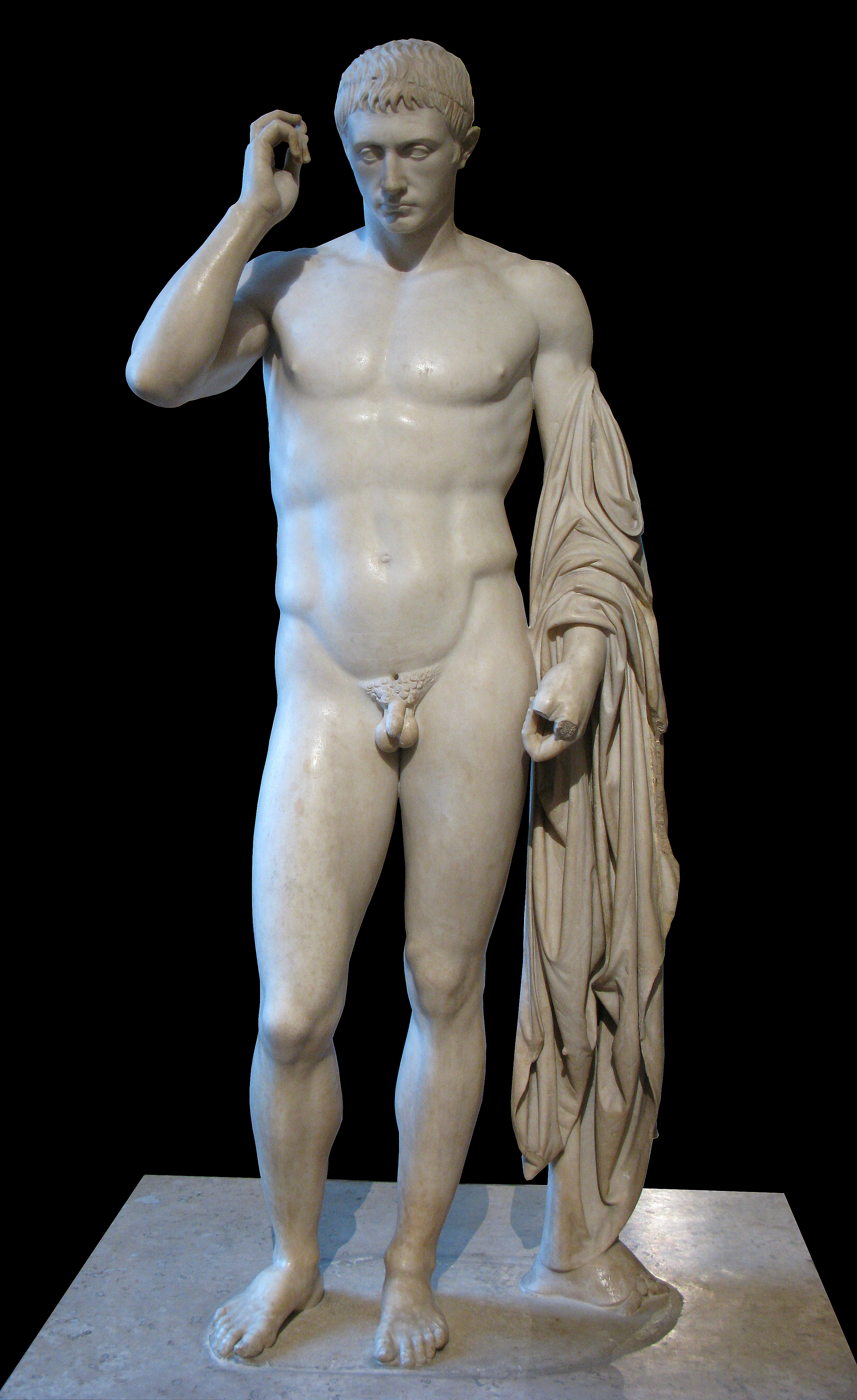
Marcellus as Hermes Logios in the Louvre, Paris

Marcellus as Hermes Logios is a sculpture of Marcellus the Younger as Hermes Logios, the god of eloquence, in Louvre (inv. 1207).

It was executed in marble (1.80 meters in height) circa 20 BC (i.e. 2 years after the nominal subject's death, possibly on his uncle Augustus's personal order as a funerary monument)

Statue is signed by Cleomenes the Athenian (Kleomenes), but probably not the author of the Aphrodite Medici in Florence, but rather his son.

It is the funerary variation of Hermes Ludovisi type with portrait head.

Before 1590 it was housed in Pope Sixtus V's villa on the Esquiline Hill. It was bought from the papal collections in 1664 by Louis XIV of France and placed in the Hall of Mirrors at the Palace of Versailles. Napoleon brought it from there to the Louvre, Paris in 1802, where it now resides. Traditionally it was thought to be a portrait of Marcellus' nephew Germanicus before the current attribution.
