= Hermes Ludovisi =

Roman sculpture

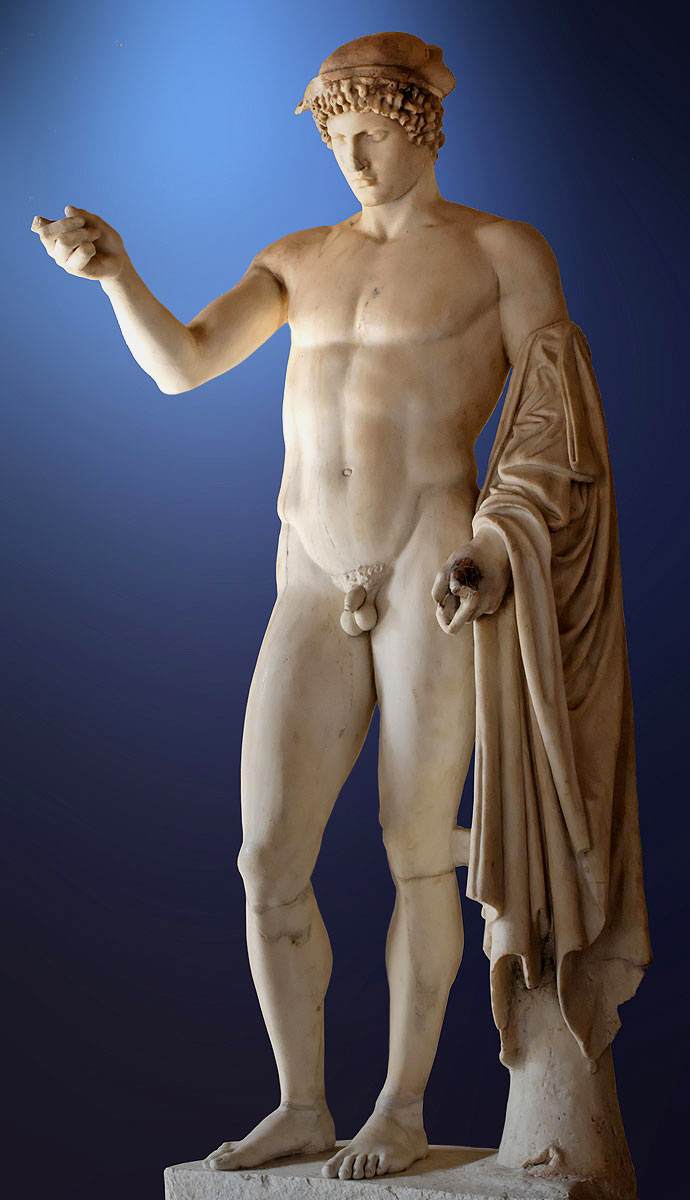
The Ludovisi Hermes (Altemps)

The Hermes Ludovisi, also formerly known as Mercurio Oratore ("Mercury the Orator"), is a Hellenistic sculpture of the god Hermes possibly in his form of Hermes Psychopompus.

Its model is among the earliest sculptural representations of Hermes as beardless and youthful.

== Description ==
It is made of Italic marble and is a somewhat slick 1st-century AD Roman copy after an inferred bronze original of the 5th century BC which is traditionally attributed to the young Phidias, ca 440 BC, or alternatively by Myron.

It was acquired by Cardinal Ludovico Ludovisi for the Ludovisi collection and is now on show at the Palazzo Altemps (National Museum in Rome).

== Hermes Ludovisi type ==
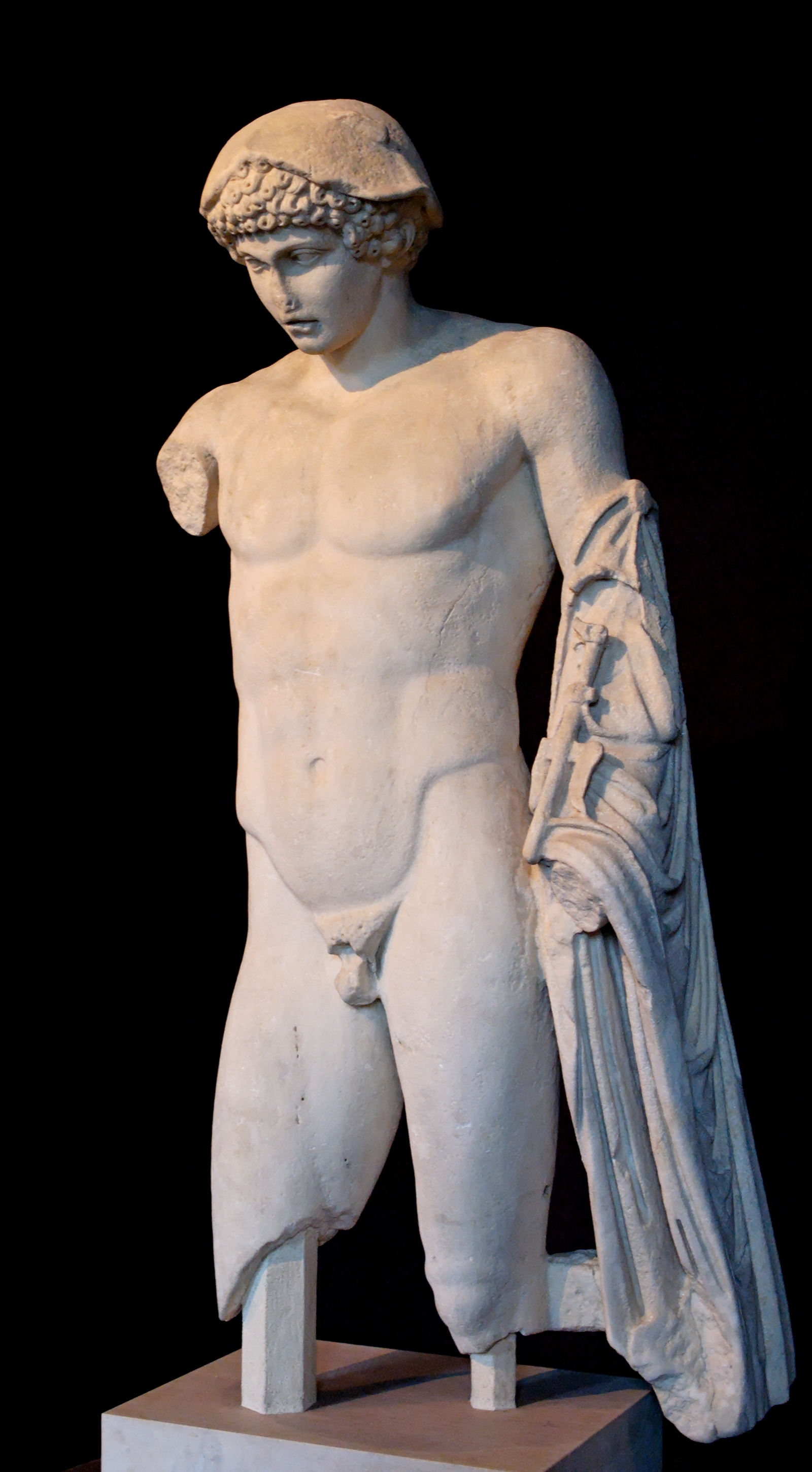
The unrestored Anzio Hermes of Ludovisi type

Greek original was quite popular, according to the number of copies. Although the Ludovisi statue has lent its name to this type, it is not an exact reproduction of the significant bronze work. Reconstruction of the original statue, derived from a comparison of all existing copies, reveals that it differs from the Ludovisi statue in at least three key aspects: hair style, right hand and the position and form of the petasos.

A variant on a somewhat reduced scale, found in Anzio, is conserved in the Museo Nazionale Romano, Palazzo Massimo alle Terme. As in other free Roman-era copies, there are variations in the shaping of the soft-brimmed petasos Hermes wears and the angle of the kerykeion in his left hand.

== Bibliography ==
- Arslan, E. A. (1966) Una Replica a Genova dell'Hermes tipo Ludovisi. BdA 51, 133--48
- Bol, P. C. (1989) Zum Petasos des Hermes Ludovisi. Festschrift fiir Jale Inan, edited by Basgelen, N., 223-27. Istanbul: Arkeoloji Ve Sanat Yayinlari.
- Graziu, V. (1992) Una Testa dell' Hermes tipo Ludovisi nella Galleria degli Uffizi. ArchCI XLIV, 297-307.
- Karouzou, S. (1961) Hermes Psychopompos. AM76, 91-106.
- Montagu, J. (1985) Alessandro Algardi, 11-12. New Haven/London: Yale University Press.
- Palma, B. (1983) Hermes Ludovisi. Catalogue no. 75 in Palma, B. & De Lachenal, L. (1983) 1 marmi Ludovisi nel museo nazionale romano. Museo nazionale romano. Le sculture, volume I, 5, edited by Giuliano, A. Rome: De Luca.
- Picozzi, M. G. (1990) Statua di Hermes (tipo Ludovisi) con testa giovanile antica non pertinente. Catalogue no. 114, 210-13, in Catalogo della Galleria Colonna in Roma. Sculture, by Carinci, F., Keutner, H., Musso, L., and Picozzi, M. G. Rome: Bramante.
