= Saint Michael Vanquishing Satan =

Painting by Raphael (1518)

- Artist: Raphael
- Year: 1518
- Type: Oil transferred from wood to canvas
- Dimensions: 268 cm × 160 cm (106 in × 63 in)
- Location: Louvre, Paris

Saint Michael Vanquishing Satan is a painting by the Italian High Renaissance artist Raphael. It shows the archangel Michael standing on top of Satan's back with his right foot. The painting was commissioned by Pope Leo X and has been located in the Louvre in Paris since 1667.

This painting has symbolic meaning within the Christian religion as it symbolizes God triumphing over evil. Raphael had a gift for creating images that evoked divinity in a subtle way and was known for being skillful at creating space within his compositions as well as movement captured at a standstill. Techniques used by Raphael were adopted at the Academie royale de peinture et de sculpture by Charles Le Brun as the foundation of French classicism. Raphael as an artist was known to stand his ground even against popes and cardinals. Having a father who was also an artist, he had the upper hand with navigating the art field.

== History ==
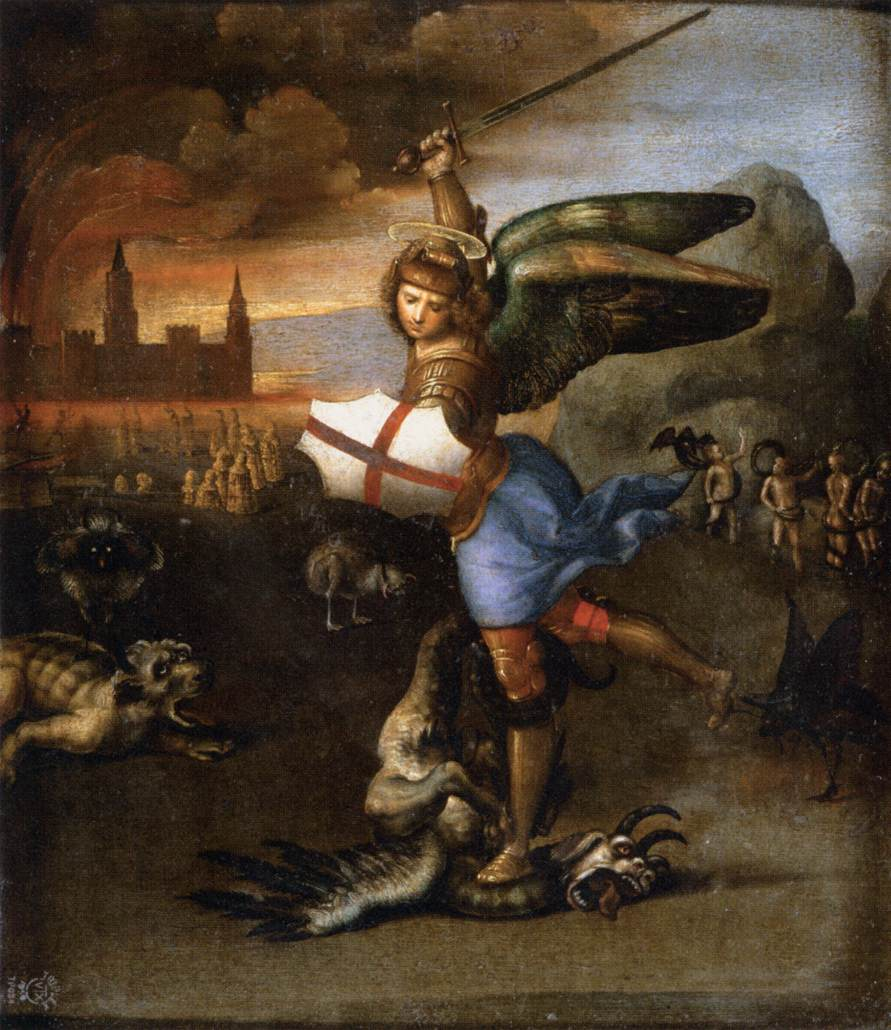
Raphael's earlier treatment of the subject, known as the Little Saint Michael (c. 1504–1505)

Raphael first visited the subject of the archangel Michael at the behest of Guidobaldo da Montefeltro, Duke of Urbino. This painting of Saint Michael was completed in 1504 or 1505 on the back of a draughtboard. The commission is believed to express appreciation to Louis XII of France for conferring the Order of Saint Michael on Francesco Maria I della Rovere, Guidobaldo's nephew and heir. A little more than a decade after completing the little Saint Michael, Raphael was commissioned to revisit the theme, producing Saint Michael Vanquishing Satan for Pope Leo X. Other sources state that the painting was originally a gift to Francis I of France. By 1667, the painting was placed in the Louvre by Louis XIV. Questions have arisen in the past as to whether the painting was executed by Raphael or by his apprentice Giulio Romano. It was atypical for Raphael to use color in such a manner. Combining orange, yellow, and gold to create a metallic finish was not typically found in his paintings. Black ink was also incorporated to darken the image while adding the effect of smoke. This painting can be tied to a collected group of elite people in France known as the Order of Saint Michael. It was used as an iconic image to represent power within the French government.

== Style ==
The image is of the Archangel Michael amidst rocky scenery. Michael stands on top of the devil with one leg while holding up his spear to deliver a strike to his head. His wings are depicted open while the devil's are closed, signifying defeat. The ideal figures that he would create were done so not to overpower the image, but with grace and reservation. George B. Rose claims that "Even though color wasn't his expertise, Raphael always used it appropriately. His use of lines were masterful and had a decorative quality to them. Raphael had great skill in portraying space through his compositions and it wasn't always tied to having a distant background. Regardless of the sense of space created, Raphael had an ability to juxtapose the vastness of nature with man's dominion over it. Man is always dominant, and the land is subservient to man's will." Here man is portrayed as the master through the image of Raphael and Satan is the subservient creature. Many of these stylistic qualities were passed down to Raphael by his teacher and master, Pietro Perugino. When comparing Raphael's paintings with those of Leonardo da Vinci, it is evident that Raphael was inspired by Leonardo's technique of creating action that is suspended in time. The way in which the Archangel's body is depicted with arm raised and foot planted on the back of Satan gives a sense of motion. The eye follows the lines of the body from the tip of the spear towards the head of the serpent. Raphael also skillfully appropriates the style in which Michelangelo would portray the male nude. One specific technique, for which Michelangelo is famous, that is found in much of Raphael's art, is the twisted pose as is depicted here. Raphael had the privilege of accessing works by Leonardo and Michelangelo as many of their artworks were commissioned by Florentine patrons. Having studied in Florence, Raphael had the opportunity to utilize these resources to his advantage.

== Reception ==
Raphael's painting was chosen as the central topic for Charles Le Brun's first class session at the Academie royale de peinture et de sculpture in 1667. During the lecture, he compared Saint Michael's musculature to that of sculptures of Apollo. Charles also noted that even though the image is frozen still, the positioning of Saint Michael's body suggests movement. In opposition to this action, the facial expression of the angel is very calm and collected. This is a reference to the authority that heaven has over hell. These insights that Le Brun made from this painting were then used as the building blocks of French classicism, especially at the Academie royale de peinture et de sculpture. Three concepts that Le Brun grasped from Raphael's painting include: a monotone color scheme to keep things connected within the composition, having a main concept that's simple, and positioning the human form in some kind of way to create the illusion of movement. These were key in understanding French classicism during this time period.

== Artist ==
Raphael's father was Giovanni Santi, who was also a painter as well as a poet. Due to this fact, Raphael had certain connections with patrons throughout his career which helped his fame. Considered a favorite of Pope Julius II, Raphael held a celebrity status in Rome from 1509 to 1520. The artist died at the very young age of 37 due to a fever. His body was buried in the Pantheon where a huge procession gathered. Paintings by Raphael are described as elevating the human experience to a heavenly place by creating figures that are indicative of the perfect bodies that humanity would obtain once in heaven. He had the ability to create feelings of divinity without affecting its ability to move people here on Earth. His paintings have a humble quality to them. He used aesthetics to represent men and women as refined in reference to the Bible so as to encourage believers. He kept the humanity of the character in order for the viewers to have something to relate to. His images gave the viewer a renewed faith and hope for a brighter future. This image touches on the idea of elevating one's faith by depicting an image where heaven is defeating hell, which is an important concept within the Christian faith. George B. Rose praised the artist by saying, "Beauty in the context of Renaissance painting was established by Raphael and he is said to have set the standard for other artists." Even though Raphael had success, he had his differences amongst the elites of his time including popes, cardinals, literati, and dukes. According to the art historian Giorgio Vasari, Raphael created his own style of painting by learning from previous masters and applying it to his works. Raphael was born in the city of Urbino in the year 1483. He moved to Florence in 1504 to study art. Having been exposed to the aesthetics of Florentine painters, Raphael's painting skills were elevated and refined. He adopted a certain style that emphasized musculature within the human form and a sense of tension created with intense compositions.

== Restoration ==
Raphael's contemporary, Sebastiano del Piombo, wrote to Michelangelo in July of the year the painting was completed to complain of the coloring of the work, suggesting that the figure looked smoky or made of iron because of the exaggerated contrast between the two sides. This may have been the hand of Giulio Romano, who according to the art historian Eugène Müntz overused black in a heavy-handed fashion to "obtain a more powerful effect." To deal with coloring issues, the painting was restored in 1537–1540 by Francesco Primaticcio. Following further restoration in 1685, it was transferred from the original wood to canvas in 1753.

== See also ==
- List of paintings by Raphael
