= Divine authority =

Divine authority may refer to:

- God, or God's power.
- Divine right of kings - claims of divinity or authority such as in the titular "king of kings".
- Mandate of Heaven - the Chinese version of the divine right of kings.
- God Emperor (disambiguation) - various rulers who claim a divine relationship.
- Scripture - the authority of religious texts.
  - Sola scriptura - the concept that the Bible alone has authority.
