= Seclusion of girls at puberty =

The seclusion of girls at puberty has been practised in societies around the world, especially prior to the early 20th century. In such cultures, girls' puberty held more significance than boys' due to menstruation, the girl's potential for giving birth, and widespread ideas of ritual purification related to the sacred power of blood. These societies practised various rites of passage, many of which lost their original forms or completely disappeared with the emergence of modern trends such as industrialization.

== Rites ==
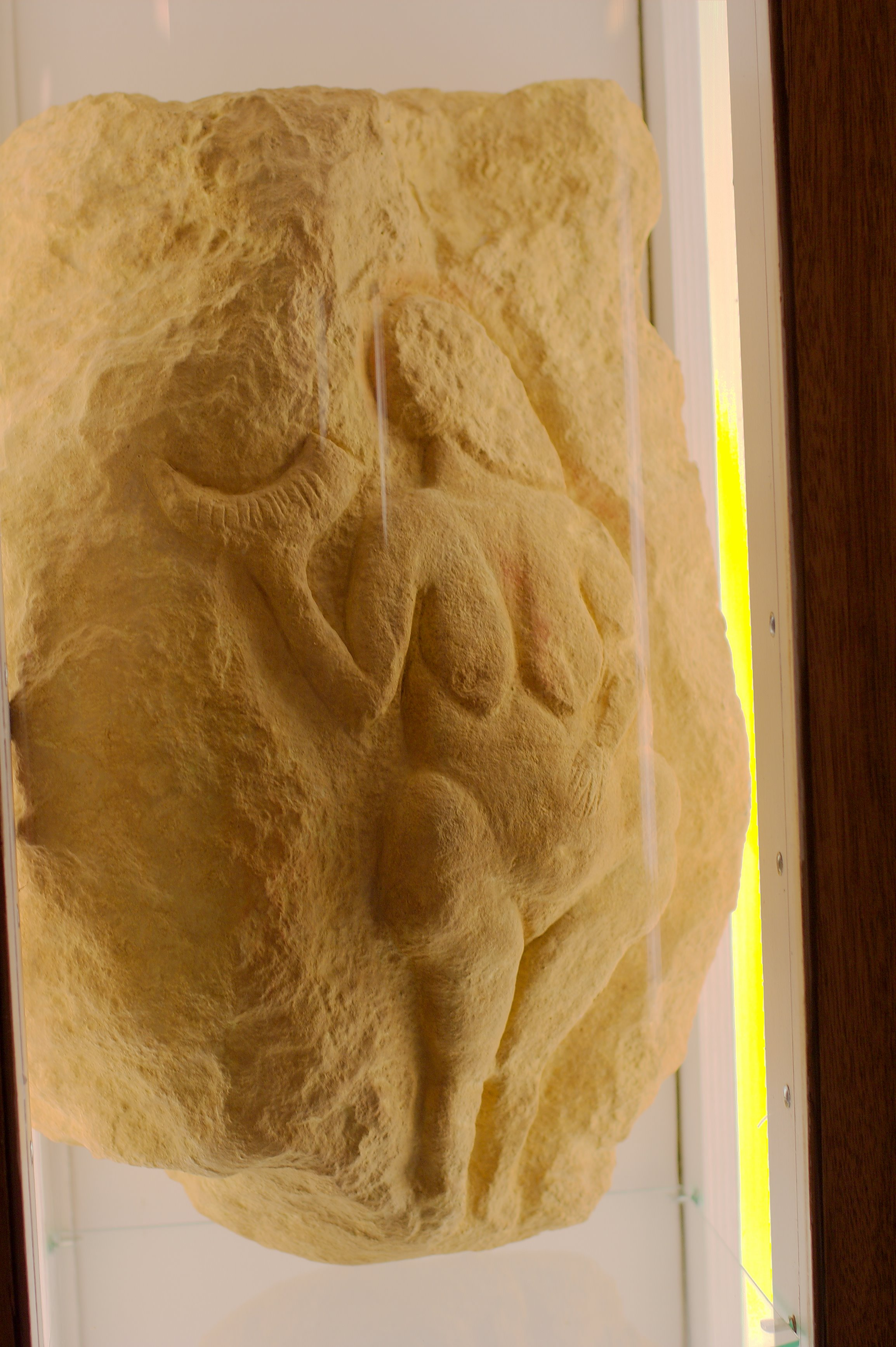
Venus of Laussel

Two rules were common in the seclusion of adolescent girls: the girl must neither touch the ground nor see the sun. According to Sir James George Frazer, these rules also applied to divine kings and priests. These divine kings were carried on shoulders by their underlings or walked upon tapestry or carpet. Scholars have speculated that the Paleolithic Venus figurines are related to such puberty rites as they lack facial features (not seeing the sun), their tapered legs without feet (not touching the ground), and their adiposity (caused by seclusion).

Among puberty rites which Frazer described, many adhered to the above rules:

- Once a girl from Zulu tribes in South Africa showed the first signs of puberty, she had to cover her head with her blanket and hide among the reeds by the river until the sunset. Afterward, she had to stay in a hut for some time before coming back to the society.
- In New Ireland and in the Kabadi District of New Guinea, pubescent girls were kept indoors in seclusion for several years.
- In many societies, including Brahmins of Bengal, girls undergoing puberty were not allowed to see any males, not even their relatives. Native Americans of California did not allow girls in their first menstruation to "look about".
- Among the Tiyans of Malabar, such girls were not allowed to catch the sight of a cow or touch "any other person, tree or plant".
- Among the Tukuna of the Northwest Amazon, the girl at puberty is kept in isolation for about three months while preparation for the ceremony is underway. During this time, she "is believed to be susceptible to all varieties of supernatural power"

Frazer believed that the Greek myth of Danaë, who was kept by her father in seclusion but was impregnated by Zeus, was related to girls' puberty rites. Lincoln also finds parallels between the Greek myth about the abduction of Persephone and the seclusion of girls at puberty. According to him, the seclusion of Tukuna girls at puberty may be referred to as "being in the underworld".

== Reasons for the seclusion ==
=== Preparation for womanhood ===
Such seclusion rites are linked to the social preparation of girls for womanhood and their roles as wives and mothers. During their seclusion, girls would be taught by older women about their future roles.

=== Superstition ===
Frazer claims the reason for seclusion practises was the "deeply engrained dread" of "menstruous blood". The first appearance of menstrual blood caused more fear than subsequent menstrual cycles. These fears stemmed more from superstition related to the sacred power of blood than from hygienic issues or the possible spread of disease.

Among the Apache Indians, "the adolescent girls are not segregated as sources of danger, but court is paid to them as to direct sources of supernatural blessing". A girl at her first menstruation was considered to be possessed of "a degree of supernatural power" which, though not entirely malevolent, still aroused feelings of the "power of evil".

The Bushmen of South Africa believed that making eye contact with a girl during this period would make men "fixed in whatever position they happen to occupy".

In earlier societies, some pubescent girls might have shown some unusual behaviours, giving rise to superstitions. Such behaviours could have been triggered by a number of factors; for example, pubescent girls are more prone to depressive episodes than boys of a similar age. Historical records also show that these girls may have been subjects of incestuous relationships and abuse, triggering abnormal behaviours.

== See also ==
- Culture and menstruation
- Menarche, a girl's first menstrual period
- Menstruation hut
- The Red Tent (Diamant novel), the tent in question being the place where the women of the tribe gather and the protagonist as a child is taught about womanhood
- Ritual purification
