= Divine right of kings =

Religious doctrine on the authority of monarchs

Henry VIII of England and Louis XIV of France were both adherents to the concept of the divine right of kings, and each of their reigns saw a rise in absolutism in their respective kingdoms.

The divine right of kings is a political and religious doctrine of political legitimacy of a monarchy in post-Reformation Western Christianity, culminating in the Age of Absolutism (c. 1610 – c. 1789). It is also known as the divine-right theory of kingship.

The doctrine asserts that a monarch is not accountable to any earthly authority (such as a parliament or the Pope) because their right to rule is derived from divine authority. Thus, the monarch is not subject to the will of the people, of the aristocracy, or of any other estate of the realm. It follows that only divine authority can judge a monarch, and that any attempt to depose, dethrone, resist or restrict their powers runs contrary to God's will and may constitute a sacrilegious act. It does not imply that their power is absolute.

In its full-fledged form, the Divine Right of Kings is associated with Henry VIII of England (and the Acts of Supremacy), James VI and I of Scotland and England, Louis XIV of France, and their successors.

== Prior medieval political concepts ==
The medieval political system, often summarised by the concept of the Res publica Christiana, was decentralised and had no concept of absolute monarchical power, as later held by rulers of the 17th and 18th centuries.

In that older system, the legitimacy of a regime was ultimately derivative of Eternal Law (Lex Aeterna), i.e. the divine blueprint for the order of the world, in which humans, by virtue of being rational creatures, participate, giving them knowledge of Natural Law (Lex Naturalis). The Natural Law is universal, but is determined locally by custom, which generates Human Law (Lex Humana). This hierarchical order from eternal to natural to human law is most famously articulated by Thomas Aquinas, and meant that a medieval regime, such as a monarchy, was legitimate so long as it ruled in accordance with that order, obligating the ruler to govern in accordance with Natural Law and to protect local customs.

The Church leadership held ultimate authority in interpreting whether a king complied with Natural Law and thus maintained his Divine Mandation, which was the signature feature of the pan-European political order of the Res publica Christiana. This is why Excommunication was dreaded by medieval kings, as it formally invalidated the legitimacy of their rule and gave the Church leadership Papal deposing power.

The power of a king was, consequently, far from absolute, and was furthermore shared with other political institutions of medieval society, such as parliaments (e.g. the Cortes Generales in Iberia) and a powerful nobility. This division was encouraged by the Church leadership and political theory of the time, with Thomas Aquinas promoting constitutional monarchy checked by a strong parliament as the preferred form of government.

All this was dramatically changed first by the Reformation, then by the Thirty Years' War, which demoted the Church leadership from ultimate political authority and developed the idea of kings as rulers under the authority of God alone, whence the Divine Right of Kings and the onset of Absolutism.

== Concept ==
Divine right has been a key element of the self-legitimization of many absolute monarchies, connected with their authority and right to rule. Related but distinct notions include Caesaropapism (the complete subordination of bishops etc. to the secular power), Supremacy (the legal sovereignty of the civil laws over the laws of the Church), Absolutism (a form of monarchical or despotic power that is unrestrained by all other institutions, such as churches, legislatures, or social elites) or Tyranny (an absolute ruler who is unrestrained even by moral law).

Historically, many notions of rights have been authoritarian and hierarchical, with different people granted different rights and some having more rights than others. For instance, the right of a father to receive respect from his son did not indicate a right for the son to receive a return from that respect. Analogously, the divine right of kings, which permitted absolute power over subjects, provided few rights for the subjects themselves.

It is sometimes signified by the phrase "by the Grace of God" or its Latin equivalent, Dei Gratia, which has historically been attached to the titles of certain reigning monarchs. Note, however, that such accountability only to God does not per se make the monarch a sacred king.

== Religious traditions outside Western Europe ==
=== Hinduism ===
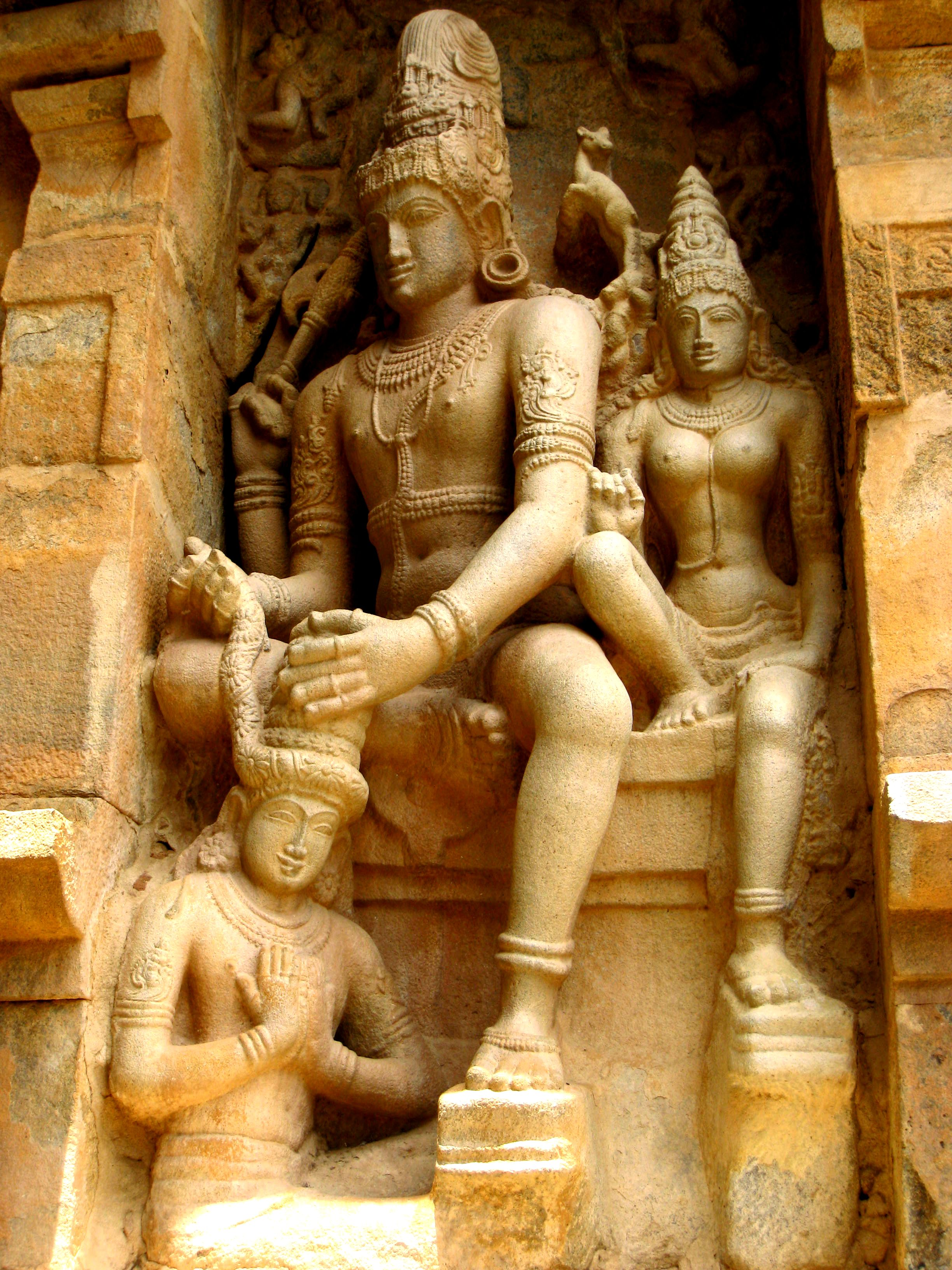
Relif from Gangaikondacholapuram depicting Chola Emperor Rajendra I being crowned by Shiva.

The Hindu text Mahabharata contains several concepts of kingship, especially underscoring its divine origins. The king is considered an embodiment of Indra, and fealty to him is considered as submitting to divine authority. In the Rajadharmanusasana Parva, Bhishma talks of the period before men had kings, and there was chaos all around –

It has been heard by us that men, in days of old, in consequence of anarchy, met with destruction, devouring one another like stronger fishes devouring the weaker ones in the water. It has been heard by us that a few amongst them then, assembling together, made certain compacts, saying, 'He who becomes harsh in speech, or violent in temper, he who seduces or abducts other people’s wives or robs the wealth that belongs to others, should be cast off by us.' For inspiring confidence among all classes of the people, they made such a compact and lived for some time. Assembling after some time they proceeded in affliction to the Grandsire, saying, 'Without a king, O divine lord, we are going to destruction. Appoint some one as our king. All of us shall worship him and he shall protect us.'.

The Mahabharata also mentions that in a land without king or royal authority, Vedic rituals are ineffectual and Agni does not convey sacrificial libations to the gods.

Another text, the Markandeya Purana, divinises the position of kingship

A king should assume the five forms of Indra, the Sun, Yama and the Moon, and also of the Wind in the work of government. Just as Indra nourishes the people on the earth with showers of water for four months, so should a king nourish them with largesses. Just as the Sun draws up the water with his rays for eight months, so should a king collect the tolls and other dues by truly subtle means. Just as Yama restrains friend and foe when the time arrives, so a king should he impartial towards friend and foe, towards the vicious and the virtuous. Just as by gazing on the full Moon, a man grows affectionate, so, where the people are all peaceful, that is the practice he should adopt from the moon. Just as the Wind moves mysterious among all creatures, so should a king move among the citizens, ministers and others, and among his relatives by the agency of spies.

— Markandeya Purana, Chapter 27

Yet at the same time, the narrative of Vena also shows a strong aversion towards the concept of an imperial cult.

When he (Veṇa) was inaugurated by the Ṛṣis monarch of the earth, he caused. it to be every where proclaimed, that no worship should be performed, no oblations offered, no gifts bestowed upon the Brahmans. "I, the king," said he, "am the lord of sacrifice; for who but I am entitled to the oblations." The Ṛṣis, respectfully approaching the sovereign, addressed him in melodious accents, and said, "Gracious prince, we salute you; hear what we have to represent. For the preservation of your kingdom and your life, and for the benefit of all your subjects, permit us to worship Hari, the lord of all sacrifice, the god of gods, with solemn and protracted rites; a portion of the fruit of which will revert to you. Viṣṇu, the god of oblations, being propitiated with sacrifice by us, will grant you, oh king, all your desires. Those princes have all their wishes gratified, in whose realms Hari, the lord of sacrifice, is adored with sacrificial rites." "Who," exclaimed Veṇa, "is superior to me? Who besides me is entitled to worship? Who is this Hari, whom you style the lord of sacrifice? Brahmā, Janārddana. Śambhu, Indra, Vāyu, Ravi, Hutabhuk, Varuṇa, Dhātā, Pūṣā, Bhūmi, the lord of night; all these, and whatever other gods there be who listen to our vows; all these are present in the person of a king: the essence of a sovereign is all that is divine. Conscious of this, I have issued my commands, and look that you obey them. You are not to sacrifice, not to offer oblations, not to give alms. As the first duty of women is obedience to their lords, so observance of my orders is incumbent, holy men, on you." "Give command, great king," replied the Ṛṣis, "that piety may suffer no decrease. All this world is but a transmutation of oblations; and if devotion be suppressed, the world is at an end." But Veṇa was entreated in vain; and although this request was repeated by the sages, he refused to give the order they suggested. Then those pious Munis were filled with wrath, and cried out to each other, "Let this wicked wretch be slain. The impious man who has reviled the god of sacrifice who is without beginning or end, is not fit to reign over the earth." And they fell upon the king, and beat him with blades of holy grass, consecrated by prayer, and slew him, who had first been destroyed by his impiety towards god.

— Vishnu Purana, Book I, Chapter 13

The development of the divine right of kingship according to Hindu principles was visible, not in the Indian subcontinent, but in Hinduised polities of Southeast Asia like Majapahit and Srivijaya (see Devaraja).

=== Zoroastrianism (Iranian world) ===
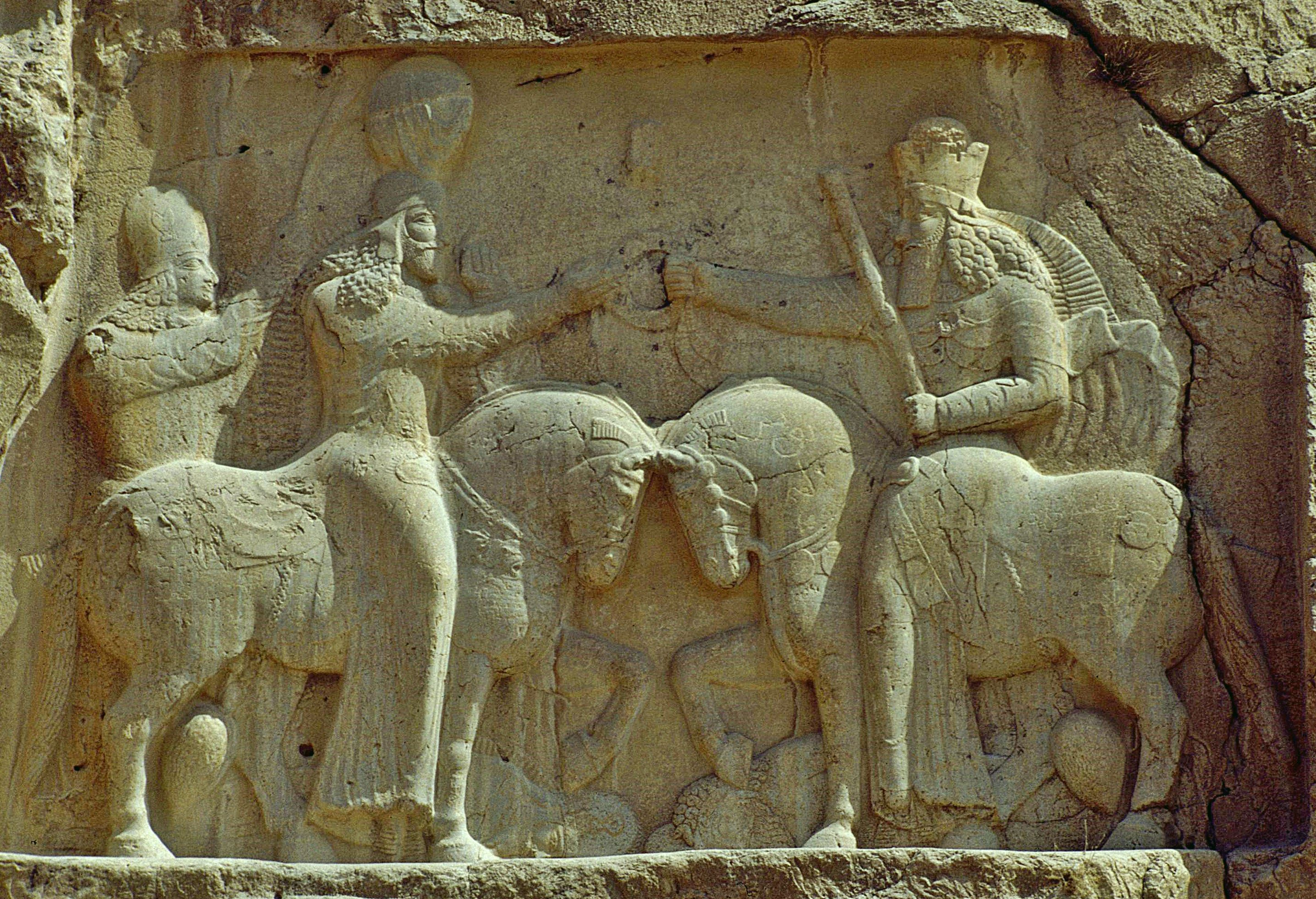
Ahura Mazda gives divine kingship to Ardashir I, scene from Naqsh-e Rostam.

Khvarenah (also spelled khwarenah or xwarra(h): Avestan: 𐬓𐬀𐬭𐬆𐬥𐬀𐬵 xᵛarənah; Persian: فرّ, romanized: far) is an Iranian and Zoroastrian concept, which literally means glory, about divine right of the kings. This may stem from early Mesopotamian culture, where kings were often regarded as deities after their death. Shulgi of Ur was among the first Mesopotamian rulers to declare himself to be divine. In the Iranian view, kings would never rule, unless Khvarenah is with them, and they will never fall unless Khvarenah leaves them. For example, according to the Kar-namag of Ardashir, when Ardashir I of Persia and Artabanus V of Parthia fought for the throne of Iran, on the road Artabanus and his contingent are overtaken by an enormous ram, which is also following Ardashir. Artabanus's religious advisors explain to him that the ram is the manifestation of the khwarrah of the ancient Iranian kings, which is leaving Artabanus to join Ardashir.

=== Judaism ===
Painting from the Dura-Europos synagogue depicting the anointing of David.

While the earliest references to kingship among Israel in the Hebrew Bible proclaim that

14.When you come to the land that the Lord your God is giving you, and you possess it and dwell in it and then say, 'I will set a king over me, like all the nations that are around me'. 15. You may indeed set a king over you whom the Lord your God will choose. One from among your brothers you shall set as king over you. You may not put a foreigner over you, who is not your brother.(Deut 17:14–15).

Significant debate on the legitimacy of kingship has persisted in Rabbinical Judaism until Maimonides, though many mainstream currents continue to reject the notion.

The controversy is highlighted by the instructions to the Israelites in the above-quoted passage, as well as the passages in 1 Samuel 8 and 12, concerning the dispute over kingship; and Perashat Shoftim. It is from 1 Samuel 8 that the people of Israel receive mishpat ha-melech, the ius regium, or the law of kingship, and from this passage that Maimonides finally concludes that Judaism supports the institution of monarchy, stating that the Israelites had been given three commandments upon entering the Promised Land – to designate a king for themselves, to wipe out the memory of Amalek, and to build the Temple.

The debate has primarily centered around the problem of being told to "designate" a king, which some rabbinical sources have argued is an invocation against a divine right of kings, and a call to elect a leader, in opposition to a notion of a divine right. Other rabbinical arguments have put forward an idea that it is through the collective decision of the people that God's will is made manifest, and that the king does therefore have a divine right – once appointed by the nation, he is God's emissary.

Jewish law requires one to recite a special blessing upon seeing a monarch: "Blessed are You, L‑rd our G‑d, King of the universe, Who has given from His glory to flesh and blood".

=== Christianity ===
Ivory panel depicting the Byzantine emperor Constantine VII receiving his crown from Jesus.

The Christian notion of a divine right of kings is traced to a story found in 1 Samuel, where the prophet Samuel anoints Saul and then David as Messiah ("anointed one") – king over Israel. In Jewish traditions, the lack of a divine leadership represented by an anointed king, beginning shortly after the death of Joshua, left the people of Israel vulnerable, and the promise of the "promised land" was not fully fulfilled until a king was anointed by a prophet on behalf of God.

The effect of anointing was seen to be that the monarch became inviolable, so that even when Saul sought to kill David, David would not raise his hand against him because "he was the Lord's anointed". Raising a hand to a king was therefore considered to be as sacrilegious as raising a hand against God and stood on equal footing as blasphemy. In essence, the king stood in place of God and was never to be challenged "without the challenger being accused of blasphemy" – except by a prophet, which under Christianity was replaced by the church.

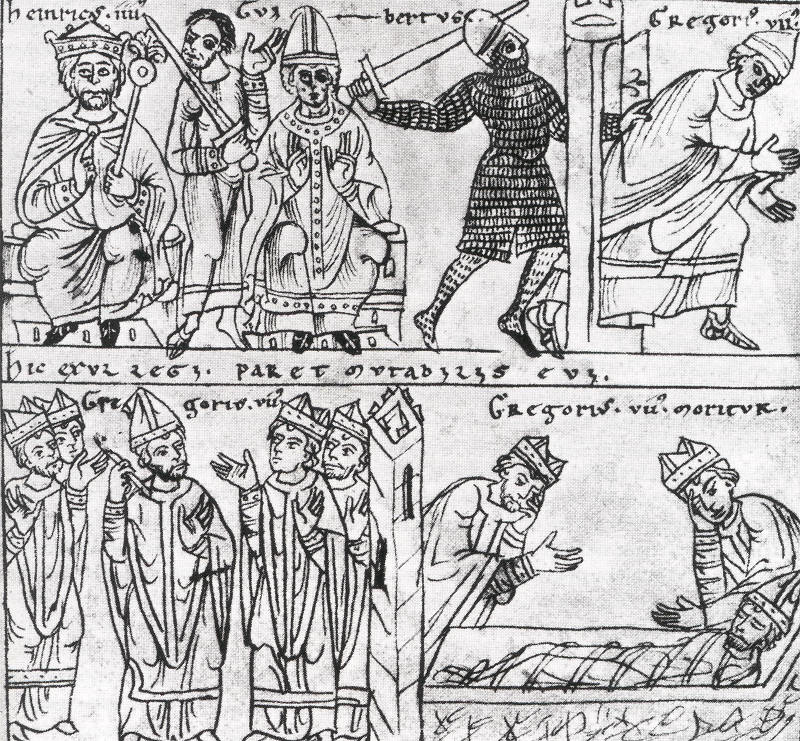
Henry IV, Holy Roman Emperor expels Pope Gregory VII from Rome (who death is portrayed in the second panel below) and replaces him with Antipope Clement III, drawn by Otto of Freising.

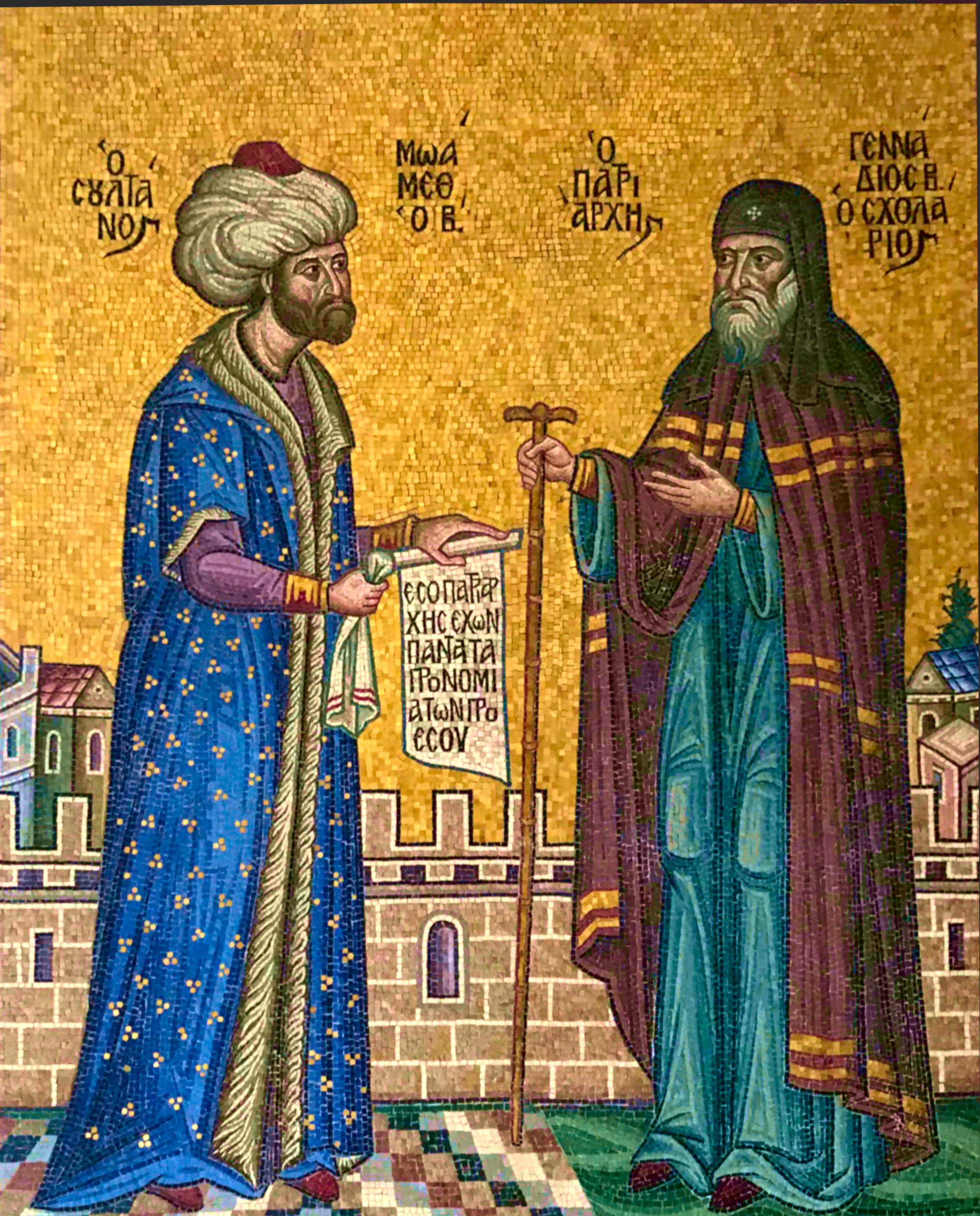
Mosaic at St. George's Cathedral, Istanbul showing Ottoman Sultan, Mehmed II appointing Gennadios II as the Greek Patriarch of Constantinople shortly after conquering the city in a continuation of Byzantine traditions. Mehmed would also create an Armenian Patriarchate of Constantinople.

Another aspect of the Christian notion of divine right of kings is the right of monarchs to nominate candidates into church positions. In the Roman Catholic Church, this practice was vehemently opposed by the Popes, beginning with the Investiture Controversy beginning with Pope Gregory VII, culminating in the abolition of the Imperial veto by Pope Pius X. In contrast, the Eastern Orthodox Church, which had its doctrine of Caesaropapism, normalised state interference in ecclesiastical appointments, to the point of even allowing the Islamic sultans of the Ottoman Empire having a say in church appointments, under the millet system.

A significant predecessor of the Western European model of divine right of kings was the notion of Ceasaropapism that emerged within the Byzantine Empire, developed under the Symphonia doctrine of Justinian I. Built over the foundations of the Roman imperial cult (where Roman emperors were also the highest priest of the pagan Roman religion), Justinian semi-legitimised this doctrine by bullying the Patriarchs during the Controversy of Three Chapters, who eventually gave in during the Second Council of Constantinople. Caesaropapism and symphonia would become the cornerstones of the Eastern Orthodox Church and the Byzantine commonwealth, as rulers like the Serbian emperor Stefan Dušan and Bulgarian emperor Boris I unilaterally raised the archbishoprics of Peć & Preslav into patriarchates, despite opposition of the Patriarch of Constantinople. The most famous example of caesaropapism is seen in Russia, when Peter the Great abolished the position of Patriarch of Moscow, replacing it with the Holy Synod. Caesaropapism persisted in the Eastern Orthodox Church even after the Ottoman conquest, as Eastern Orthodox Christians were clubbed together under the Rum millet. Appointment of the Patriarch of Constantinople couldn't proceed without approval of the Ottoman Sultan (who took on the role that was previously exercised by Byzantine Emperors), the Patriachate of Peć and Archbishopric of Ohrid were abolished by firmans issued by Sultan Mustafa III in 1766 and 1767 respectively and the Status Quo formulated by the Sublime Porte formalised division of sacred sites officially claimed by the Greek Patriarchate of Jerusalem among other Christian denominations. Elsewhere, the Serbian Orthodox Patriarchs of Karlovci were appointed by the Roman Catholic Hapsburg rulers of Hungary.

In Western Europe that was under the Latin Church, the doctrine of symphonia lost ground with the end of the Byzantine Papacy due to the Iconoclast controversy and the Photian schism, with its ultimate demise occurring during the East-West schism (also precipitated by the problem of two emperors). Caesaropapism persisted within the Latin Church, through the Frankish Papacy and Tusculan Papacy culminating in Holy Roman Emperor Henry III deposing Pope Benedict IX at the Council of Sutri (similar to how Justinian had deposed the Ostrogothic Pope Silverius following the Byzantine reconquest of Rome). The first significant challenge to Caesaropapism in Latin Church emerged during the Investiture Controversy, with Pope Gregory VII ultimately emerging victorious through the Concordat of Worms. However, ceasoropapism continued to persist in the Latin Church, as exemplified by the conflict of the Popes with the Hohenstaufen emperors (resulting in creation of antipopes by the emperors), the Avignon Papacy and the Western Schism. It was only during the Renaissance Papacy that the popes were able to shake off caesaropapism completely, giving way to the doctrine of Papal supremacy.

== Pre-Modern history ==
With the rise of firearms, the consolidation of centralized nation-states, and the upheavals of the Protestant Reformation in the late 16th and early 17th centuries, the theory of divine right emerged as a powerful justification for monarchical authority. It asserted that the king’s power was granted directly by God, giving him absolute control over political governance and, in many cases, spiritual affairs, and placing him above accountability to parliaments, nobles, or other earthly institutions. This doctrine helped monarchs legitimize centralized rule during a period of religious conflict, technological change, and challenges to traditional feudal structures.

Henry VIII of England declared himself the Supreme Head of the Church of England and exerted the power of the throne more than any of his predecessors.

As a political theory, it was further developed by James VI of Scotland (1567–1625) and came to the fore in England under his reign as James I of England (1603–1625). Louis XIV of France (1643–1715) strongly promoted the theory as well.

Historian J. P. Sommerville stresses the theory was polemic: "Absolutists magnified royal power. They did this to protect the state against anarchy and to refute the ideas of resistance theorists", those being in Britain Catholic and Presbyterian theorists.

The concept of divine right incorporates, but exaggerates, the ancient Christian concept of "royal God-given rights", which teaches that "the right to rule is anointed by God", although this idea is found in many other cultures, including Aryan and Egyptian traditions.

=== Medieval Era ===
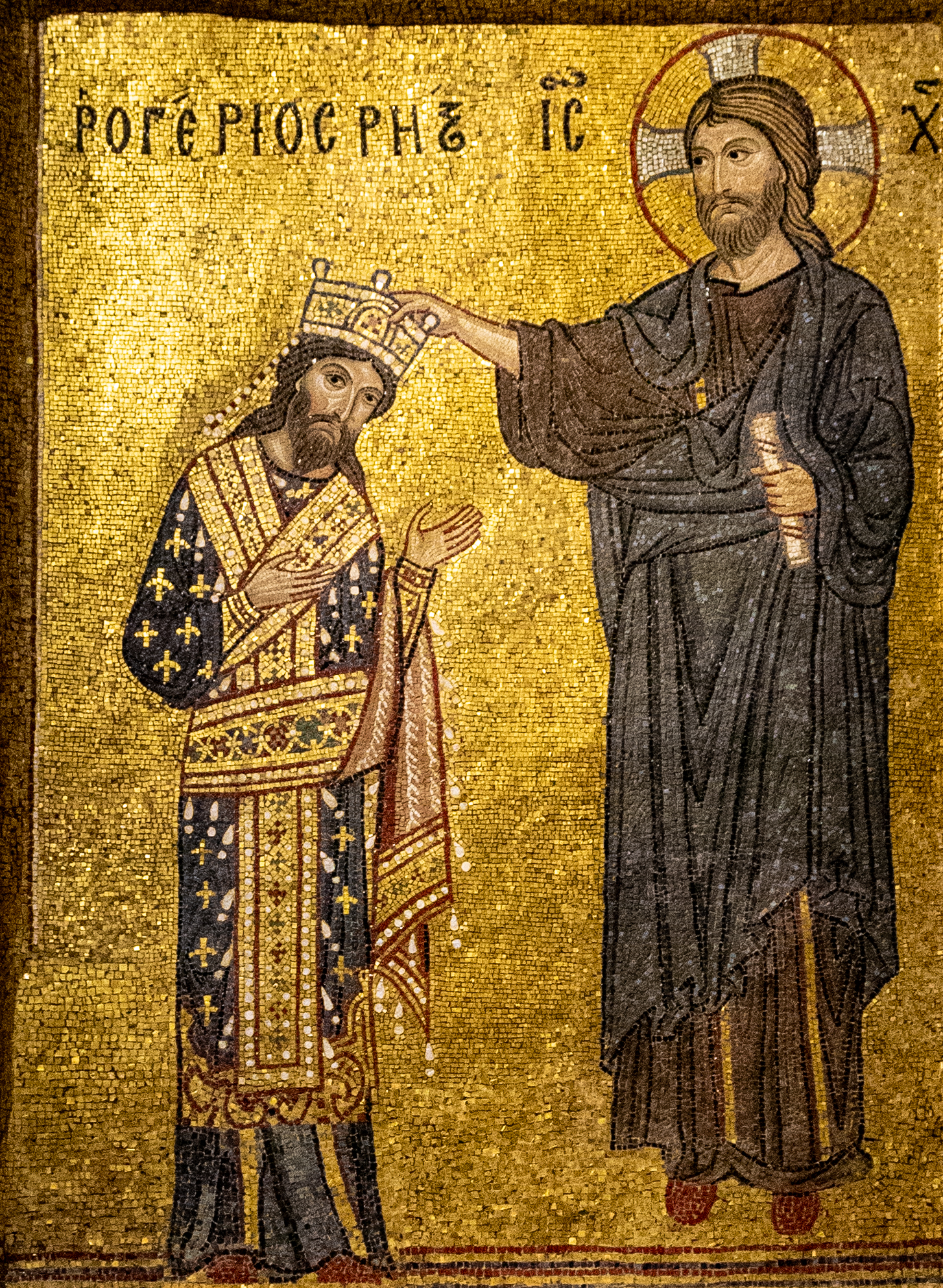
Roger II of Sicily invested with kingship by Christ (mosaic of the Church of Santa Maria dell'Ammiraglio, Palermo)

Outside of Christianity, kings were often seen as ruling with the backing of heavenly powers.

==== Early Middle Ages ====
Although the later Roman Empire had developed the European concept of a divine regent in Late Antiquity, Adomnan of Iona provides one of the earliest written examples of a Western medieval concept of kings ruling with divine right. He wrote of the Irish King Diarmait mac Cerbaill's assassination and claimed that divine punishment fell on his assassin for the act of violating the monarch.

Adomnan also recorded a story about Saint Columba supposedly being visited by an angel carrying a glass book, who told him to ordain Aedan mac Gabrain as King of Dal Riata. Columba initially refused, and the angel answered by whipping him and demanding that he perform the ordination because God had commanded it. The same angel visited Columba on three successive nights. Columba finally agreed, and Aedan came to receive ordination. At the ordination, Columba told Aedan that so long as he obeyed God's laws, then none of his enemies would prevail against him, but the moment he broke them, this protection would end, and the same whip with which Columba had been struck would be turned against the king.

Adomnan's writings most likely influenced other Irish writers, who in turn influenced continental ideas as well. Pepin the Short's coronation may have also come from the same influence. The Byzantine Empire can be seen as the progenitor of this concept (which began with Constantine I). This in turn inspired the Carolingian dynasty and the Holy Roman Emperors, whose lasting impact on Western and Central Europe further inspired all subsequent Western ideas of kingship.

==== High Middle Ages ====
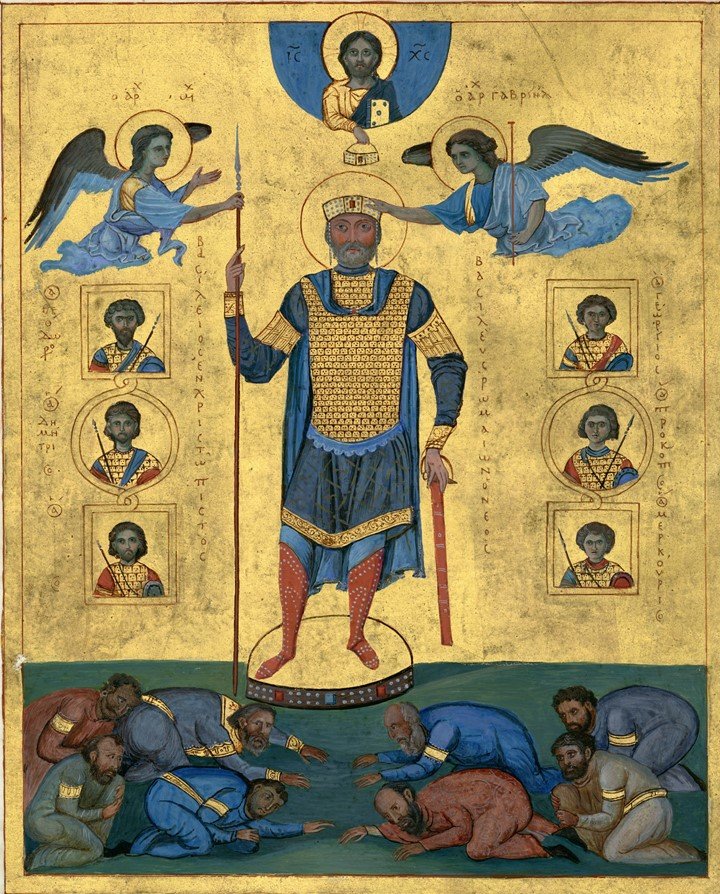
Contemporary image of Basil II receiving the Imperial Crown and Holy Lance from angels and receiving a crown from Christ (signifying his divine right to kingship), with men resembling the people he ruled over, bowing down before him.

In the Middle Ages, the idea that God had granted certain earthly powers to the monarch, just as he had given spiritual authority and power to the church, especially to the Pope, was already a well-known concept long before later writers coined the term "divine right of kings" and employed it as a theory in political science.

However, the dividing line for the authority and power was a subject of frequent contention: notably in England with the murder of Archbishop Thomas Beckett (1170). For example, Richard I of England declared at his trial during the diet at Speyer in 1193: "I am born in a rank which recognizes no superior but God, to whom alone I am responsible for my actions", and it was Richard who first used the motto "Dieu et mon droit" ("God and my right") which is still the motto of the Monarch of the United Kingdom.

Thomas Aquinas condoned extra-legal tyrannicide in the worst of circumstances:

When there is no recourse to a superior by whom judgment can be made about an invader, then he who slays a tyrant to liberate his fatherland is [to be] praised and receives a reward.

— Thomas Aquinas, Commentary on the Magister Sententiarum (Sentences II, Distinction 44, question 2, article 2)

On the other hand, Aquinas forbade the overthrow of any morally, Christianly and spiritually legitimate king by his subjects. The only human power capable of deposing the king was the pope. The reasoning was that if a subject may overthrow his superior for some bad law, who was to be the judge of whether the law was bad? If the subject could so judge his own superior, then all lawful superior authority could lawfully be overthrown by the arbitrary judgement of an inferior, and thus all law was under constant threat.

According to John of Paris, kings had their jurisdictions and bishops (and the pope) had theirs, but kings derived their supreme, non-absolute temporal jurisdiction from popular consent.

==== Late Middle Ages and Renaissance ====
The Church was the final guarantor that Christian kings would follow the laws and constitutional traditions of their ancestors and the laws of God and of justice.

Radical English theologian John Wycliffe's theory of Dominium meant that injuries inflicted on someone personally by a king should be born by them submissively, a conventional idea, but that injuries by a king against God should be patiently resisted even to death; gravely sinful kings and popes forfeited their (divine) right to obedience and ownership, though the political order should be maintained. More aggressive versions of this were taken up by Lollards and Hussites.

For Erasmus of Rotterdam it was the consent of the people which gives and takes away "the purple", not an unchangeable divine mandate.

=== Catholic limits ===
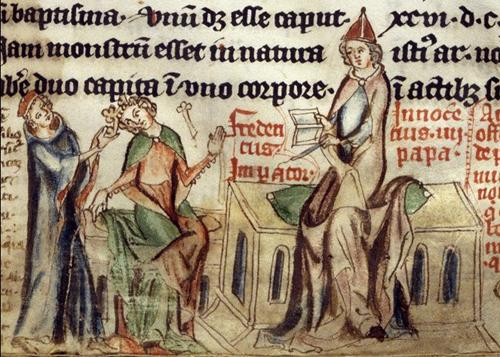
Medieval miniature depicting the deposition of Frederick II, Holy Roman Emperor by Pope Innocent IV.

Catholic jurisprudence holds that the monarch is always subject to natural and divine law, which are regarded as superior to the monarch.

The possibility of monarchy declining morally, overturning natural law, and degenerating into a tyranny oppressive of the general welfare was answered theologically with the Catholic concept of the spiritual superiority of the Pope (there is no "Catholic concept of extra-legal tyrannicide", as some falsely suppose, the same being expressly condemned by St Thomas Aquinas in chapter 7 of his De Regno).

Catholic thought justified limited submission to the monarchy by reference to the following:

1. The Old Testament, in which God chose kings to rule over Israel, beginning with Saul who was then rejected by God in favour of David, whose dynasty continued (at least in the southern kingdom) until the Babylonian captivity.
2. The New Testament, in which the first pope, Peter, commands that all Christians shall honour the Roman Emperor, even though, at that time, he was still a pagan emperor. Paul agreed with Peter that subjects should be obedient to the powers that be because they are appointed by God, as he wrote in his Epistle to the Romans. Likewise, Jesus Christ proclaims in the Gospel of Matthew that one should "Render unto Caesar the things which are Caesar's"; that is at first, literally, the payment of taxes as binding those who use the imperial currency. Jesus told Pontius Pilate that his authority as Roman governor of Judaea came from heaven according to John 19:10–11.
3. The endorsement by the popes and the church of the line of emperors beginning with the Emperors Constantine and Theodosius, later the Eastern Roman emperors, and finally the Western Roman emperor, Charlemagne and his successors, the Catholic Holy Roman Emperors.

== Conceptions in the early modern period ==
=== Reformation Era ===
The divine right of kings, or divine-right theory of kingship, is a political and religious doctrine of royal and political legitimacy. It asserts that a monarch is subject to no earthly authority, deriving his right to rule directly from the will of God. The king is thus not subject to the will of his people, the aristocracy, or any other estate of the realm, including (in the view of some, especially in Protestant countries) the church.

A weaker or more moderate form of this political theory does hold, however, that the king is subject to the church and the pope, although completely irreproachable in other ways; but according to this doctrine in its strong form, only God can judge an unjust king.

The doctrine implies that any attempt to depose the king or to restrict his powers runs contrary to the will of God and may constitute a sacrilegious act.

Before the Reformation the anointed king was, within his realm, the accredited vicar of God for secular purposes (see the Investiture Controversy); after the Reformation he (or she if queen regnant) became this in Protestant states for religious purposes also.

==== Kingdom of Scotland ====
The Scots textbooks of the divine right of kings were written in 1597–1598 by James VI of Scotland. His Basilikon Doron, a manual on the powers of a king, was written to edify his four-year-old son Henry Frederick that a king "acknowledgeth himself ordained for his people, having received from God a burden of government, whereof he must be countable".

The conception of ordination brought with it largely unspoken parallels with the Anglican and Catholic priesthood, but the overriding metaphor in Basilikon Doron was that of a father's relation to his children. "Just as no misconduct on the part of a father can free his children from obedience to the fifth commandment."

==== Kingdom of England ====
In England, the first modern proponent of the divine right of kings, and Caesaropapism, was Protestant William Tyndale's Obedience of the Christian Man. Historian Gerard Wegemer comments "In 1528 Anne Boleyn exacerbated Henry’s lust for imperial power by giving him a book that justified everything he would ever want to do."

James, after becoming James I of England, also had printed his Defense of the Right of Kings in the face of English theories of inalienable popular and clerical rights.

He based his theories in part on his understanding of the Bible, as noted by the following quote from a speech to parliament delivered in 1610 as James I of England:

The state of monarchy is the supremest thing upon earth, for kings are not only God's lieutenants upon earth and sit upon God's throne, but even by God himself, they are called gods. There be three principal [comparisons] that illustrate the state of monarchy: one taken out of the word of God, and the two other out of the grounds of policy and philosophy. In the Scriptures, kings are called gods, and so their power after a certain relation compared to the Divine power. Kings are also compared to fathers of families; for a king is true parens patriae [parent of the country], the politic father of his people. And lastly, kings are compared to the head of this microcosm of the body of man.

James's reference to "God's lieutenants" is apparently a reference to the text in Romans 13 where Paul refers to "God's ministers".

(1) Let every soul be subject unto the higher powers. For there is no power but of God: the powers that be are ordained of God. (2) Whosoever, therefore, resisteth the power, resisteth the ordinance of God: and they that resist shall receive to themselves damnation. (3) For rulers are not a terror to good works, but to the evil. Wilt thou then not be afraid of the power? do that which is good, and thou shalt have praise of the same: (4) For he is the minister of God to thee for good. But if thou do that which is evil, be afraid; for he beareth not the sword in vain: for he is the minister of God, a revenger to execute wrath upon him that doeth evil. (5) Wherefore ye must needs be subject, not only for wrath but also for conscience sake. (6) For this cause pay ye tribute also: for they are God's ministers, attending continually upon this very thing. (7) Render therefore to all their dues: tribute to whom tribute is due; custom to whom custom; fear to whom fear; honour to whom honour.

===== Ceremonial conflation =====
Some of the symbolism within the coronation ceremony for British monarchs, in which they are anointed with holy oils by the Archbishop of Canterbury, thereby ordaining them to monarchy, perpetuates the ancient Christian monarchical ideas and ceremonial. However, in the UK, the symbolism ends there, as the real governing authority of the monarch was all but extinguished by the Glorious Revolution of 1688–89. The monarch of the United Kingdom is currently the only European sovereign still crowned in a formal, religious coronation ceremony. In most other monarchies, accession is marked by an oath, inauguration, blessing, or simple proclamation rather than by a full Christian coronation.

In England, it is not without significance that the sacerdotal vestments, generally discarded by the clergy – dalmatic, alb and stole – continued to be among the insignia of the sovereign (see Coronation of the British monarch). Moreover, this sacrosanct character he acquired not by virtue of his "sacring", but by hereditary right; the coronation, anointing and vesting were but the outward and visible symbol of a divine grace adherent in the sovereign by virtue of his title. Even Roman Catholic monarchs, like Louis XIV, would never have admitted that their coronation by the archbishop constituted any part of their title to reign; it was no more than the consecration of their title.

==== Kingdom of France ====
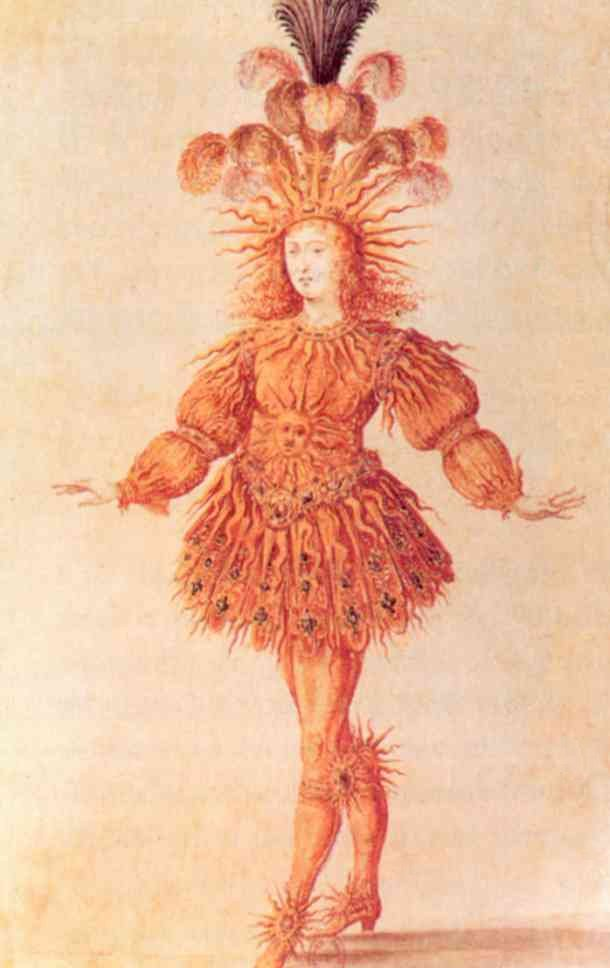
Louis XIV depicted as the Sun King

The French prelate Jacques-Bénigne Bossuet made a classic statement of the doctrine of divine right in a sermon preached before King Louis XIV:

Les rois règnent par moi, dit la Sagesse éternelle: 'Per me reges regnant'; et de là nous devons conclure non seulement que les droits de la royauté sont établis par ses lois, mais que le choix des personnes est un effet de sa providence.

Kings reign by Me, says Eternal Wisdom: "Per me reges regnant" [in Latin]; and from that we must conclude not only that the rights of royalty are established by its laws, but also that the choice of persons [to occupy the throne] is an effect of its providence.

The French Huguenot nobles and clergy, having rejected the pope and the Catholic Church, were left only with the supreme power of the king who, they taught, could not be gainsaid or judged by anyone. Since there was no longer the countervailing power of the papacy and since the Church of England was a creature of the state and had become subservient to it, this meant that there was nothing to regulate the powers of the king, and he became an absolute power. In theory, divine, natural, customary, and constitutional law still held sway over the king, but, absent a superior spiritual power, it was difficult to see how they could be enforced since the king could not be tried by any of his own courts.

==== Holy Roman Empire ====
One passage in scripture supporting the idea of the divine right of kings was used by Martin Luther, when urging the secular authorities to crush the Peasant Rebellion of 1525 in Germany in his Against the Murderous, Thieving Hordes of Peasants, basing his argument on Paul's Epistle to the Romans.

It is related to the ancient Catholic philosophies regarding monarchy, in which the monarch is God's vicegerent upon the earth and therefore subject to no inferior power.

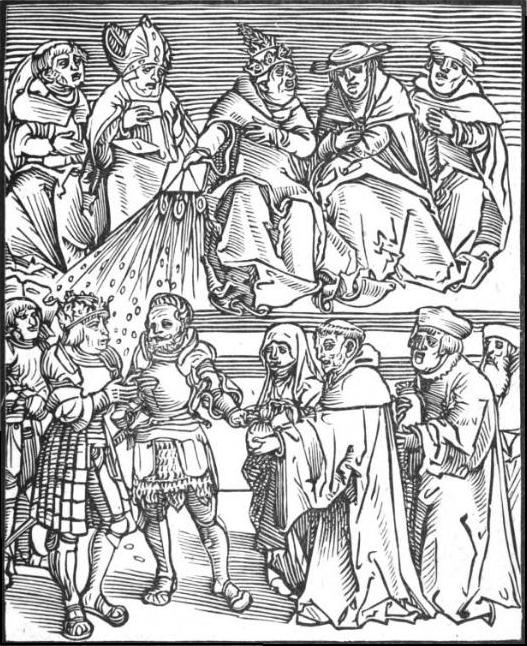
Antichristus, a woodcut by Lucas Cranach the Elder, of the pope using the temporal power to grant authority to a ruler contributing generously to the Catholic Church

=== Religious Opposition ===
In the sixteenth century, both Catholic and Protestant political thinkers alike challenged the idea of a monarch's "divine right".

==== Catholic ====
The Spanish Catholic historian Juan de Mariana put forward the argument in his book De rege et regis institutione (1598) that since society was formed by a "pact" among all its members, "there can be no doubt that they are able to call a king to account". Mariana thus challenged divine right theories by stating in certain circumstances, tyrannicide could be justified.

Cardinal Robert Bellarmine also "did not believe that the institute of monarchy had any divine sanction" and shared Mariana's belief that there were times where Catholics could lawfully remove a monarch.

==== Protestant ====
Among groups of English Protestant exiles fleeing from Queen Mary I, some of the earliest anti-monarchist publications emerged. "Weaned off uncritical royalism by the actions of Queen Mary ... The political thinking of men like Ponet, Knox, Goodman and Hales."

In 1553, Mary I, a Roman Catholic, succeeded her Protestant half-brother, Edward VI, to the English throne. Mary set about trying to restore Roman Catholicism by making sure that: Edward's religious laws were abolished in the Statute of Repeal Act (1553); the Protestant religious laws passed in the time of Henry VIII were repealed; and the Revival of the Heresy Acts were passed in late 1554.

When Thomas Wyatt the Younger instigated what became known as Wyatt's rebellion in early 1554, John Ponet, the highest-ranking ecclesiastic among the exiles, allegedly participated in the uprising. He escaped to Strasbourg after the Rebellion's defeat and, the following year, he published A Shorte Treatise of Politike Power, in which he put forward a theory of justified opposition to secular rulers.

Ponet's treatise comes first in a new wave of anti-monarchical writings ... It has never been assessed at its true importance, for it antedates by several years those more brilliantly expressed but less radical Huguenot writings which have usually been taken to represent the Tyrannicide-theories of the Reformation.

— A.G. Dickens

Ponet's pamphlet was republished on the eve of King Charles I's execution.

== Peak and decline ==
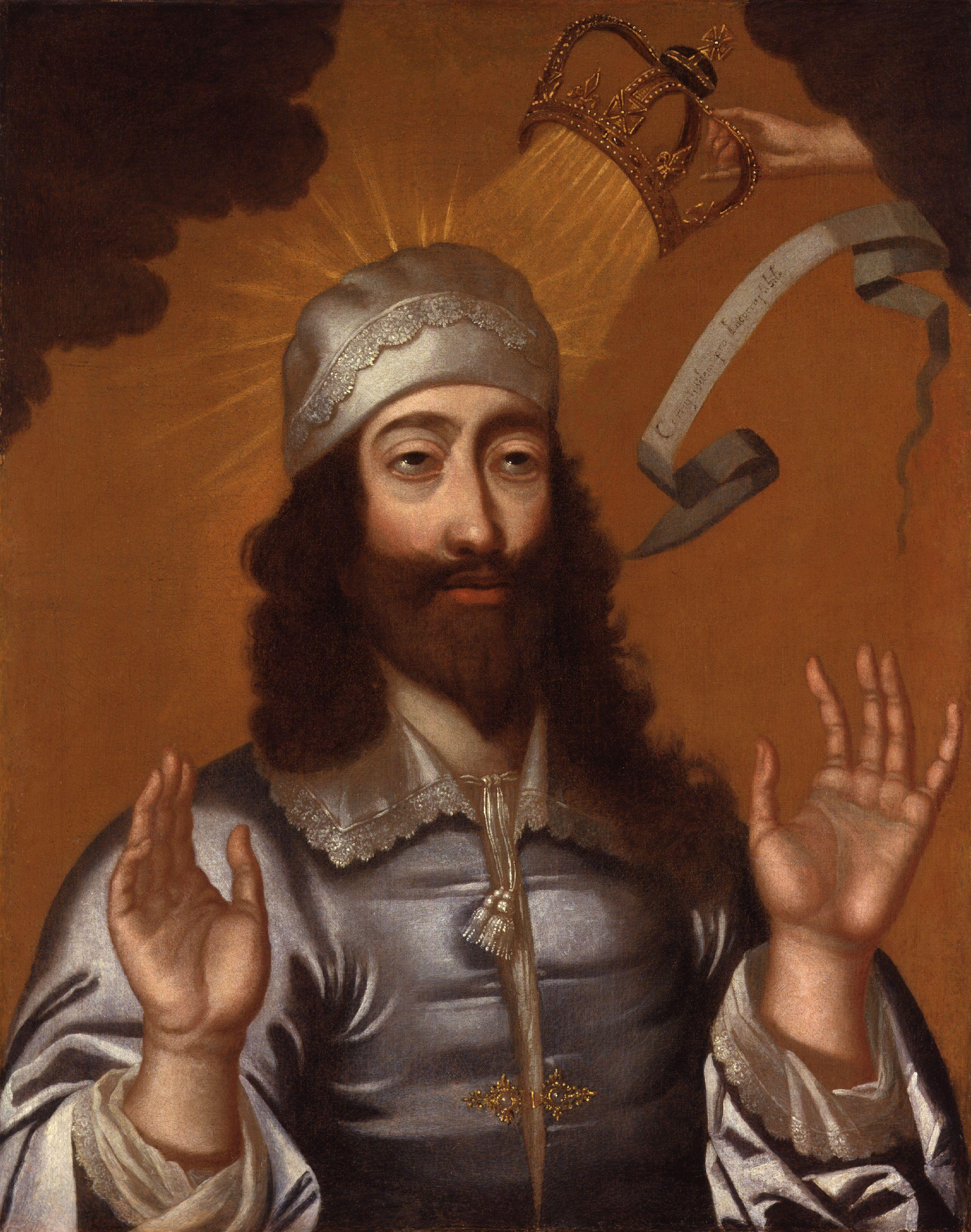
Charles I of England, with a divine hand moving his crown

=== Pre-Enlightenment ===
In England the doctrine of the divine right of kings was developed to its most extreme logical conclusions during the political controversies of the 17th century; its most famous exponent was Sir Robert Filmer. It was the main issue to be decided by the English Civil War, the Royalists holding that "all Christian kings, princes and governors" derive their authority direct from God, the Parliamentarians that this authority is the outcome of a contract, actual or implied, between sovereign and people.

In one case the king's power would be unlimited, according to the famous saying misattributed to Louis XIV: "L' état, c'est moi", or limited only by his own free act; in the other his actions would be governed by the advice and consent of the people, to whom he would be ultimately responsible. The victory of this latter principle was proclaimed to all the world by the execution of Charles I.

The doctrine of divine right, indeed, for a while drew nourishment from the blood of the royal "martyr"; it was the guiding principle of the Anglican Church of the Restoration; but it suffered a rude blow when James II of England made it impossible for the clergy to obey both their conscience and their king.

The Glorious Revolution of 1688 made an end of it as a great political force. This has led to the constitutional development of the Crown in Britain, as held by descent modified and modifiable by parliamentary action.

=== Enlightenment era ===
Counter-reaction to the Divine Rights of Kings played an important role in the development of concepts of legal rights, such as Liberty, dignity, freedom and equality . Its focus on the individual of the monarch stands in contrast to the conception of non-hierarchical, universal human rights, which started being developed in the Middle Ages by scholars such as St. Thomas Aquinas (see Natural Law) and were systematised by the thinkers of the Age of Enlightenment, e.g. John Locke.

U.S. Founding Father John Adams considered John Ponet's work to have contained "all the essential principles of liberty, which were afterward dilated on by Sidney and Locke", including the idea of a three-branched government.

Over time, opposition to the divine right of kings came from a number of sources, including poet John Milton in his pamphlet The Tenure of Kings and Magistrates, and Thomas Paine in his pamphlet Common Sense. By 1700 an Anglican Archbishop was prepared to assert that Kings hold their Crowns by law alone, and the law may forfeit them.

Probably the two most famous declarations of a right to revolution against tyranny in the English language are John Locke's Essay concerning The True Original, Extent, and End of Civil-Government and Thomas Jefferson's formulation in the United States Declaration of Independence that "all men are created equal".

== Related concepts in other religions ==
- Mandate of Heaven and monarch as the Son of Heaven - Sinosphere
- Madkhalism - Islam
- Monarchs who are also deities:
  - God emperors
  - God kings
- Sacred kings - the occupant of the monarchy gains religious significance or has support from a deity
  - Cakravartin - South Asia
  - Kut - Central Asia

== See also ==
- Absolutism (European history)
- Absolute monarchy
- Theocracy
- Ancien Régime – the government in France justified by the divine right of kings
- Caliphate
- Church and state in medieval Europe
- Cuius regio, eius religio – the European idea that the religion of the people follows the religion of the ruler
- Exclusive right
- Royal prerogative
- Vindiciae contra tyrannos – a tract opposing the divine right of kings
- Sacred king
- Divine command theory
