= Rite of passage =

Ritual reflecting change of social status

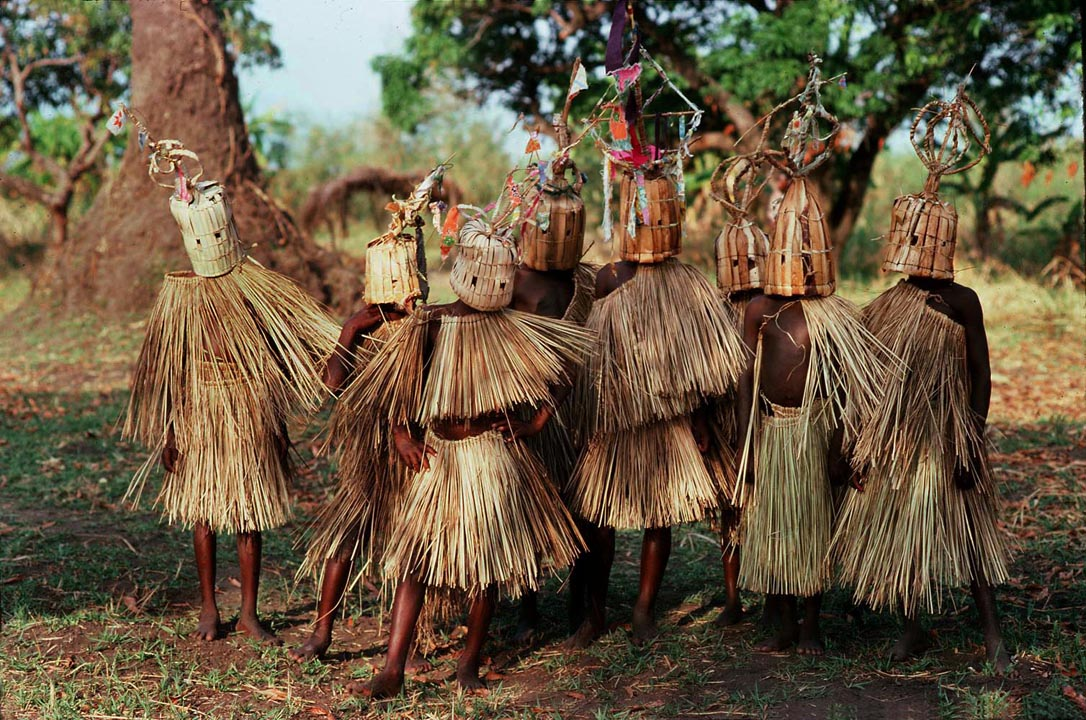
Initiation ritual of boys in Malawi. The ritual marks the passage from child to adult, each subgroup having its customs and expectations.

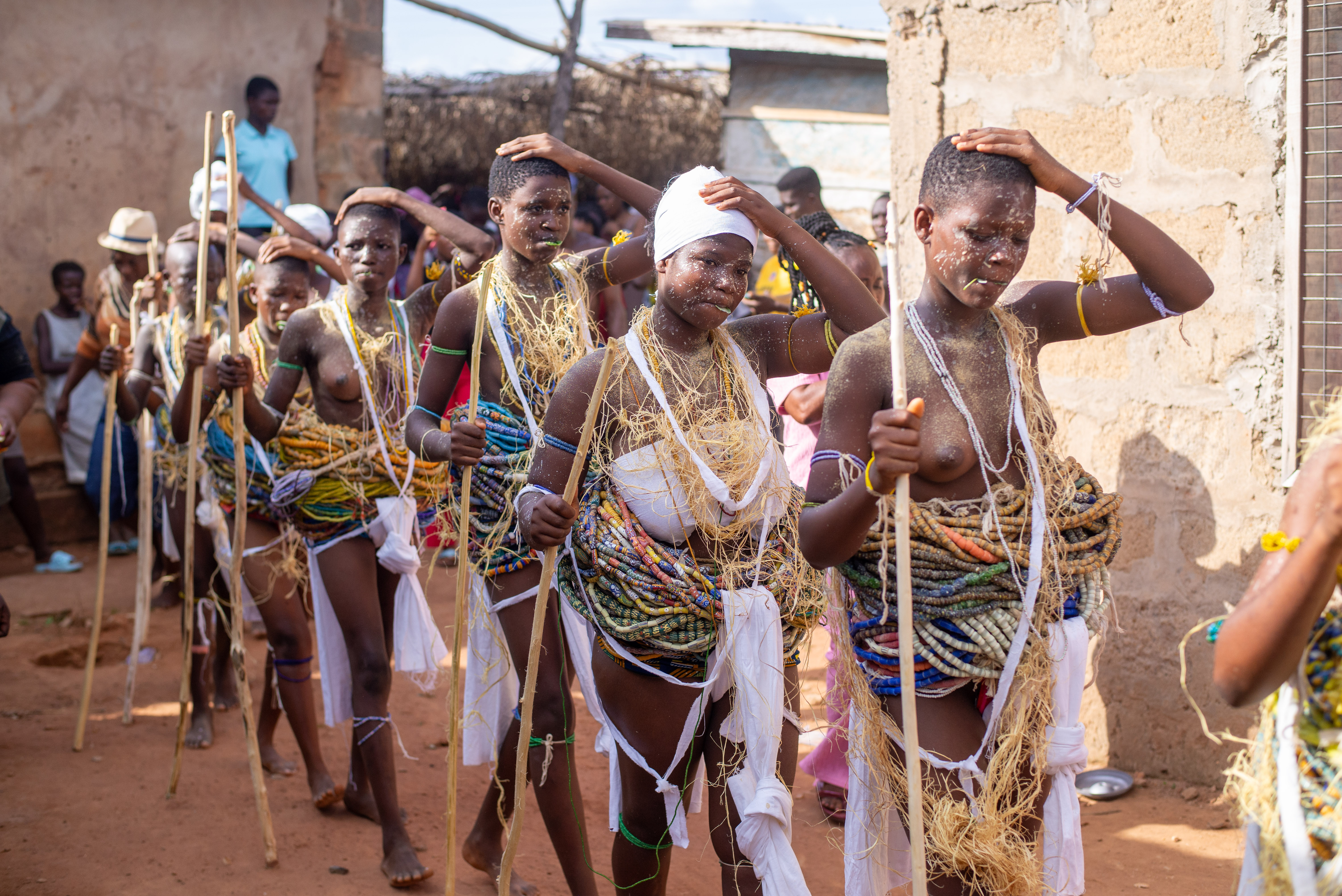
Dipo rites of passage

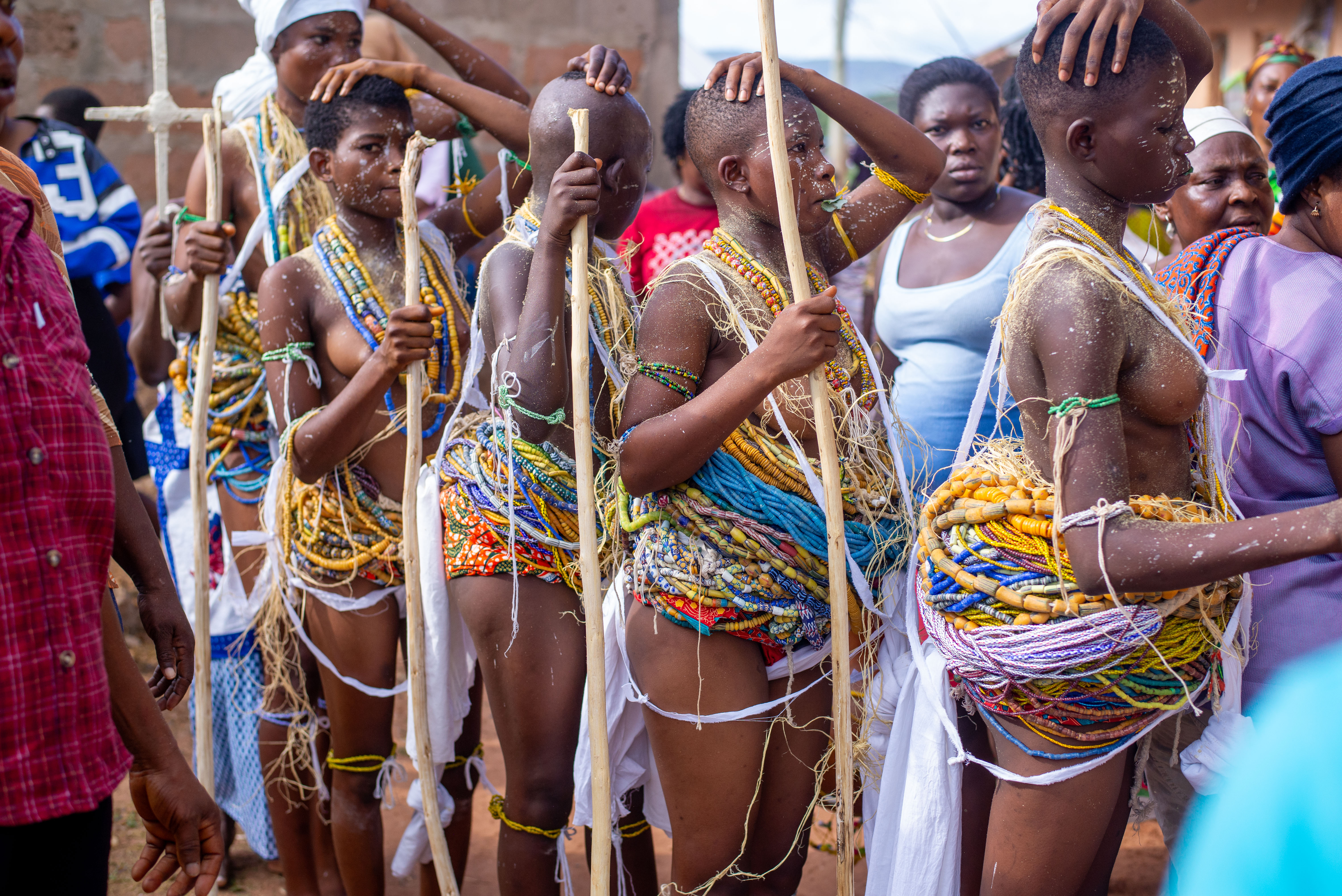
Rites of passage of young girls in the Eastern Region of Ghana

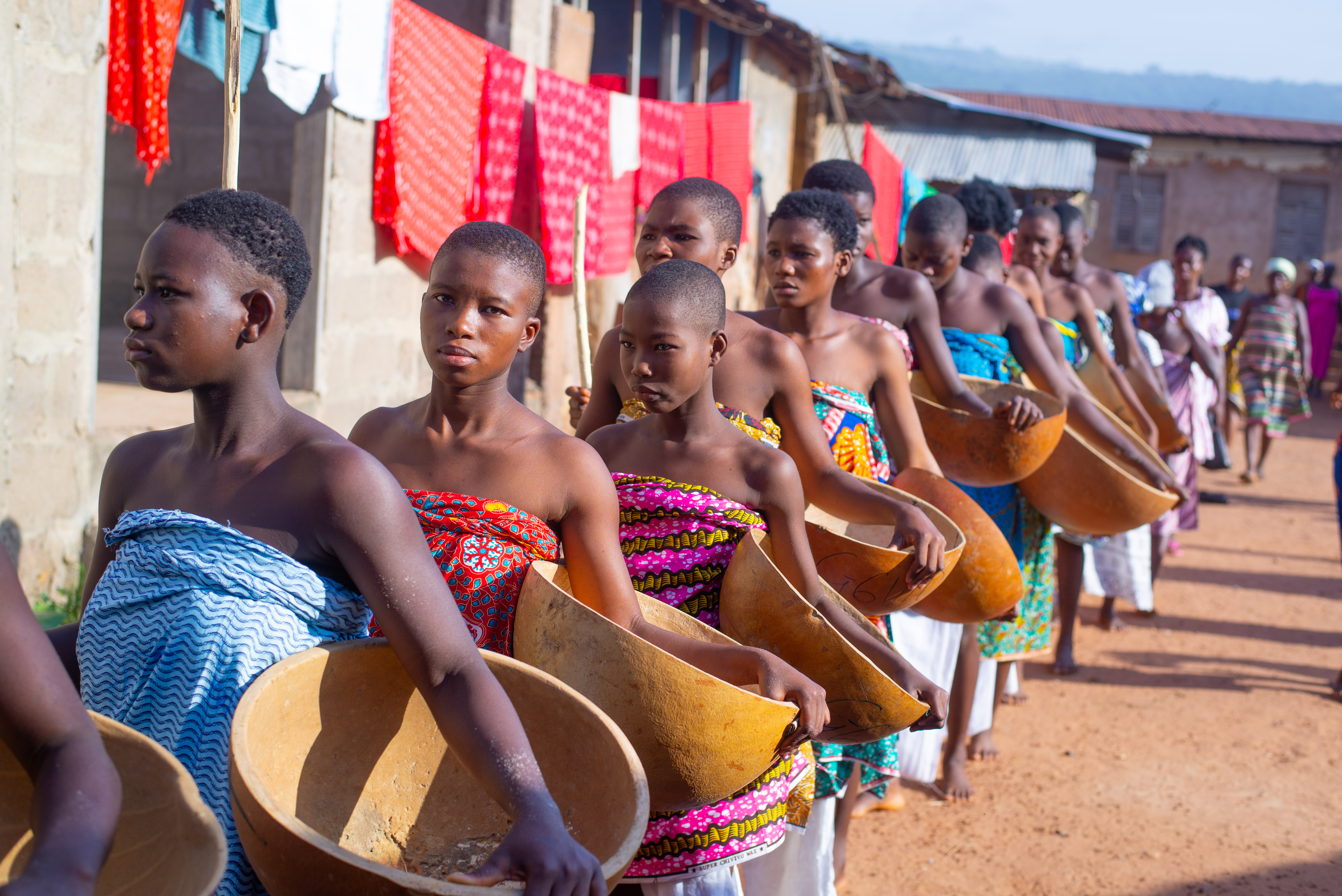
Dipo girls undergoing rites of passage

A rite of passage is a ceremony or ritual of the passage which occurs when an individual leaves one group to enter another. It involves a significant change of status in society. In cultural anthropology, the term is the anglicisation of rite de passage, a French term innovated by the ethnographer Arnold van Gennep in his work Les rites de passage, The Rites of Passage. The term is now fully adopted into anthropology as well as into the literature and popular cultures of many modern languages.

== Original conception ==
In English, Van Gennep's first sentence of his first chapter begins:

"Each larger society contains within it several distinctly separate groupings. ... In addition, all these groups break down into still smaller societies in subgroups."

The population of a society belongs to multiple groups, some more important to the individual than others. Van Gennep uses the metaphor, "as a kind of house divided into rooms and corridors." A passage occurs when an individual leaves one group to enter another; in the metaphor, he changes rooms.

Van Gennep further distinguishes between "the secular" and "the sacred sphere." Theorizing that civilizations are arranged on a scale, implying that the lower levels represent "the simplest level of development," he hypothesizes that "social groups in such a society likewise have magico-religious foundations." Many groups in modern industrial society practice customs that can be traced to an earlier sacred phase. Passage between these groups requires a ceremony: a ritual rite of passage, that is, a life cycle ritual.

The rest of Van Gennep's book presents a description of rites of passage and an organization into types, although in the end he despairs of ever capturing them all: "It is but a rough sketch of an immense picture ...." He is able to find some universals, mainly two: "the sexual separation between men and women, and the magico-religious separation between the profane and the sacred." (Earlier the translators used secular for profane.) He refuses credit for being the first to recognize type of rites. In the work he concentrates on groups and rites individuals might normally encounter progressively: pregnancy, childbirth, initiation, betrothal, marriage, funerals and the like. He mentions some others, such as the territorial passage, a crossing of borders into a culturally different region, such as one where a different religion prevails.

== Stages ==
Rites of passage have three phases: separation, liminality, and incorporation, as van Gennep described. "I propose to call the rites of separation from a previous world, preliminal rites, those executed during the transitional stage liminal (or threshold) rites, and the ceremonies of incorporation into the new world postliminal rites."

In the first phase, people withdraw from their current status and prepare to move from one place or status to another. "The first phase (of separation) comprises symbolic behavior signifying the detachment of the individual or group ... from an earlier fixed point in the social structure." There is often a detachment or "cutting away" from the former self in this phase, which is signified in symbolic actions and rituals. For example, the cutting of the hair for a person who has just joined the army. He or she is "cutting away" the former self: the civilian.

The transition (liminal) phase is the period between stages, during which one has left one place or state but has not yet entered or joined the next. "The attributes of liminality or of liminal personae ("threshold people") are necessarily ambiguous."

In the third phase (reaggregation or incorporation) the passage is consummated [by] the ritual subject." Having completed the rite and assumed their "new" identity, one re-enters society with one's new status. Re-incorporation is characterized by elaborate rituals and ceremonies, like debutant balls and college graduation, and by outward symbols of new ties: thus "in rites of incorporation there is widespread use of the 'sacred bond', the 'sacred cord', the knot, and of analogous forms such as the belt, the ring, the bracelet and the crown."

== Psychological effects ==
Laboratory experiments have shown that severe initiations produce cognitive dissonance. It is theorized that such dissonance heightens group attraction among initiates after the experience, arising from internal justification of the effort used. Rewards during initiations have important consequences in that initiates who feel more rewarded express stronger group identity. As well as group attraction, initiations can also produce conformity among new members. Psychology experiments have also shown that initiations increase feelings of affiliation.

Aronson and Mills tested the Festinger's (1957) theory of cognitive dissonance by having three groups read either embarrassing material, not very embarrassing material, or nothing at all to a group. Aronson and Mills summarized Festinger's theory of cognitive dissonance as such when discussing the rationale for their study: "No matter how attractive a group is to a person it is rarely completely positive, i.e., usually there are some aspects of the group that the individual does not like. If he has undergone an unpleasant initiation to gain admission to the group, his cognition that he has gone through an unpleasant experience for the sake of membership is dissonant with his cognition that there are things about the group that he does not like. He can reduce this dissonance in two ways. He can convince himself that the initiation was not very unpleasant, or he can exaggerate the positive characteristics of the group and minimize its negative aspects. With increasing severity of initiation it becomes more and more difficult to believe that the initiation was not very bad. Thus, a person who has gone through a painful initiation to become a member of a group should tend to reduce his dissonance by over estimating the attractiveness of the group." Those who read the severely embarrassing material perceived the group as more attractive than those who read the mildly embarrassing material or nothing at all. Another study using mathematical subtraction tasks reached the opposite conclusion but research using electrical shocks supported the concept that suffering increased the degree to which participants liked the group.

== Cultural ==
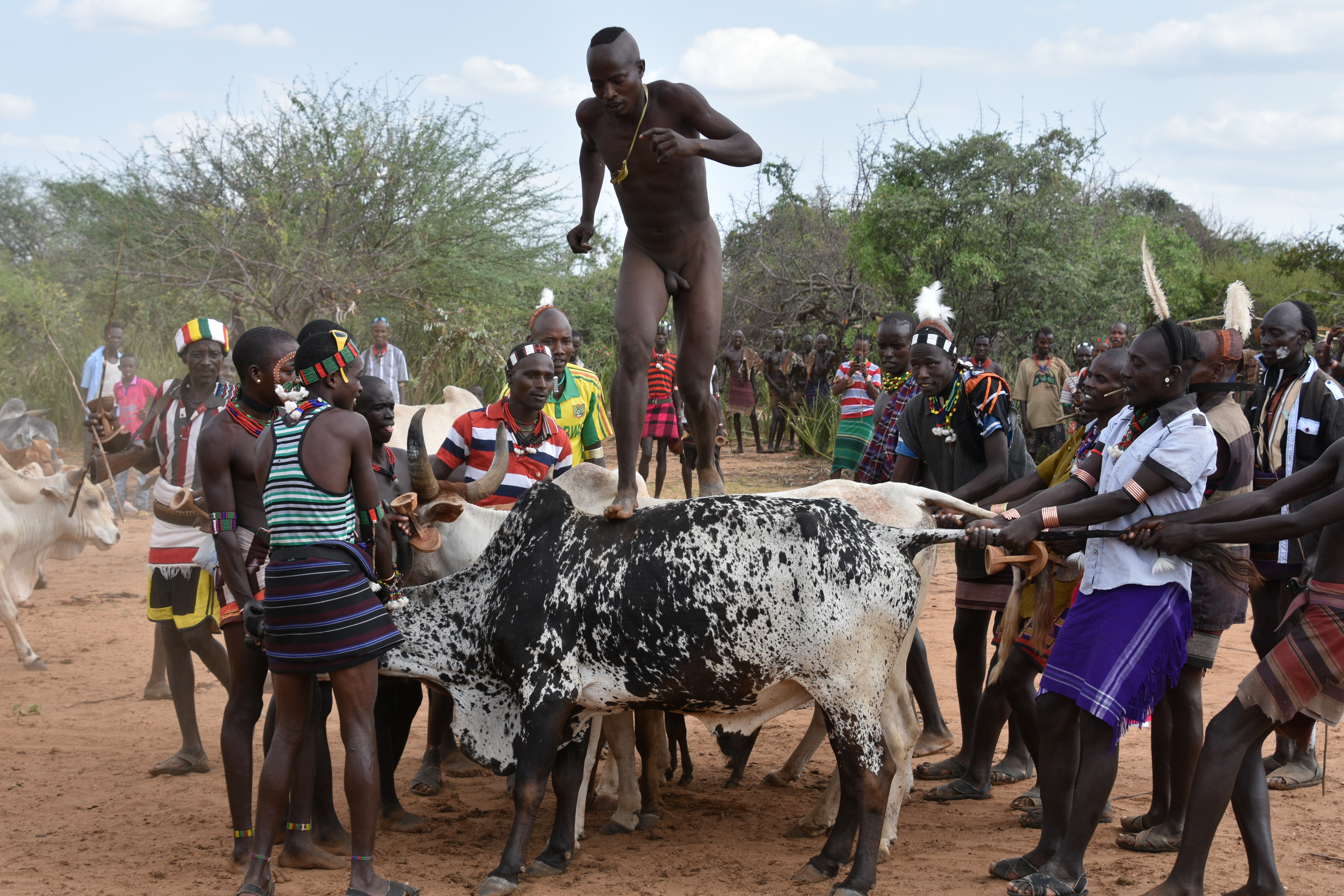
The Hamar are known for their custom of "bull jumping", which initiates a boy into manhood.

Initiation rites are seen as fundamental to human growth and development as well as socialization in many African communities. These rites function by ritually marking the transition of someone to full group membership. It also links individuals to the community and the community to the broader and more potent spiritual world. Initiation rites are "a natural and necessary part of a community, just as arms and legs are natural and necessary extension of the human body". These rites are linked to individual and community development. Dr. Manu Ampim identifies five stages; rite to birth, rite to adulthood, rite to marriage, rite to eldership and rite to ancestorship. In Zulu culture, entering womanhood is celebrated by the Umhlanga.

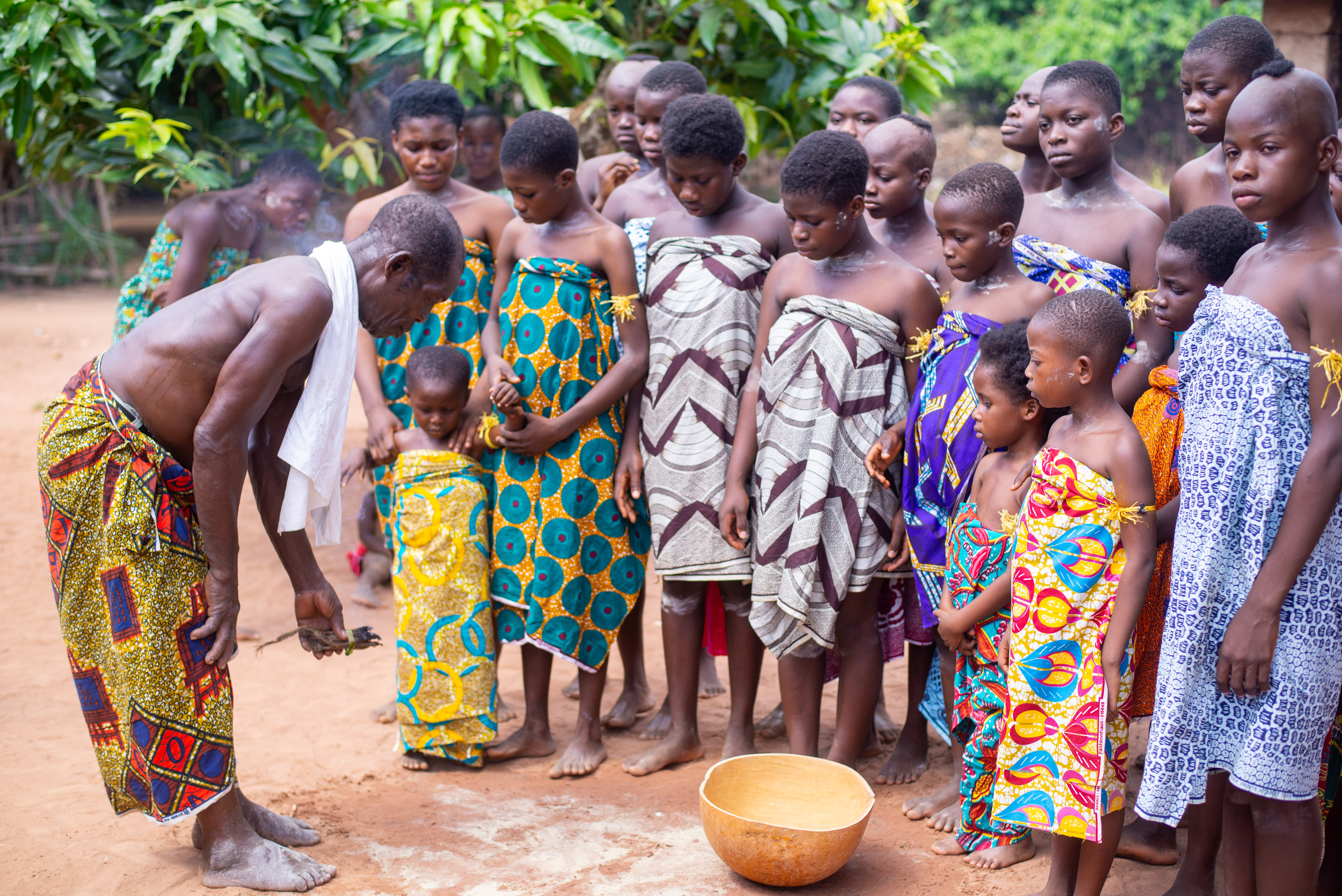
Pouring of libation and incantation by an elder during Dipo rites

== Types and examples ==
Rites of passage are diverse, and are found throughout many cultures around the world. Many western societal rituals may look like rites of passage but miss some of the important structural and functional components. However, in many Native and African-American communities, traditional rites of passage programs are conducted by community-based organizations such as Man Up Global. Typically the missing piece is the societal recognition and reincorporation phase. Adventure education programs, such as Outward Bound, have often been described as potential rites of passage. Pamela Cushing researched the rites of passage impact upon adolescent youth at the Canadian Outward Bound School and found the rite of passage impact was lessened by the missing reincorporation phase. Bell (2003) presented more evidence of this lacking third stage and described the "Contemporary Adventure Model of a Rites of Passage" as a modern and weaker version of the rites of passage typically used by outdoor adventure programs.

=== Coming of age ===
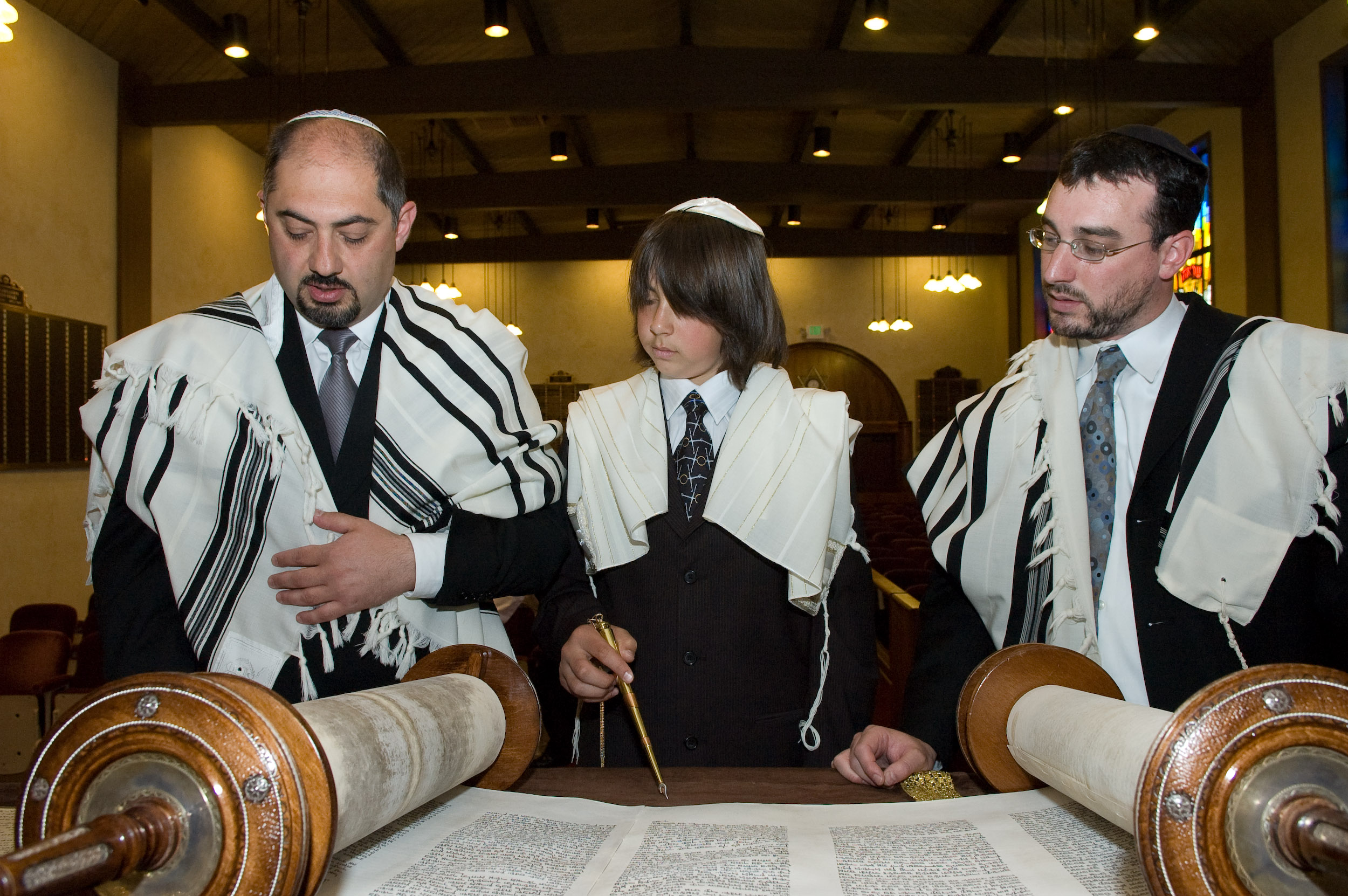
Jewish boy reading a Torah scroll at his Bar Mitzvah, using a Yad

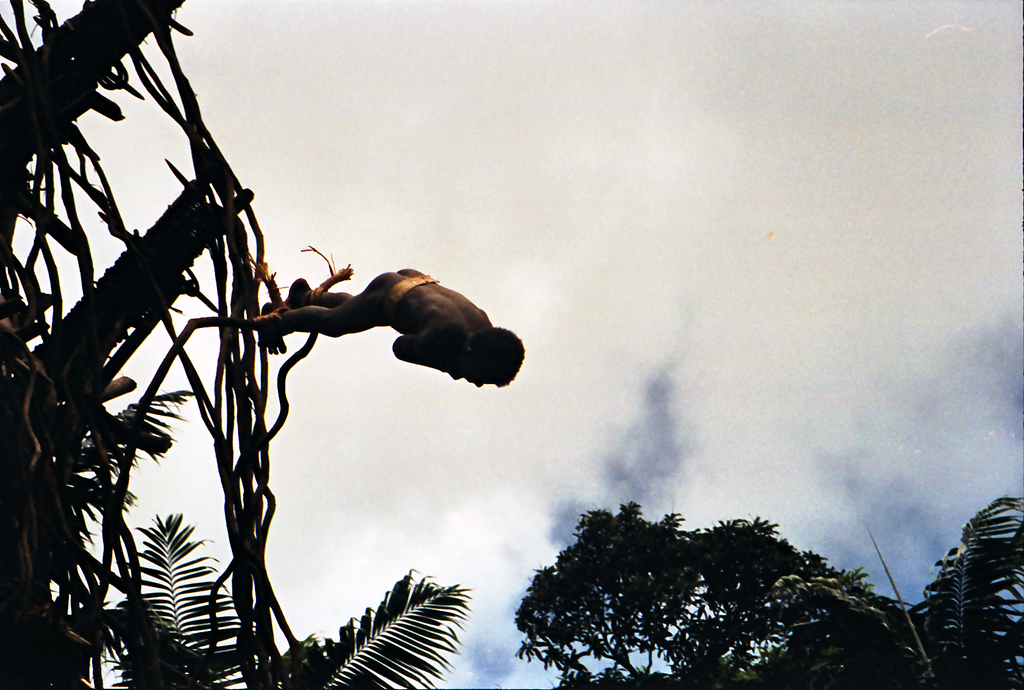
Land diving is a rite of passage for boys of the South Pacific island of Pentecost.

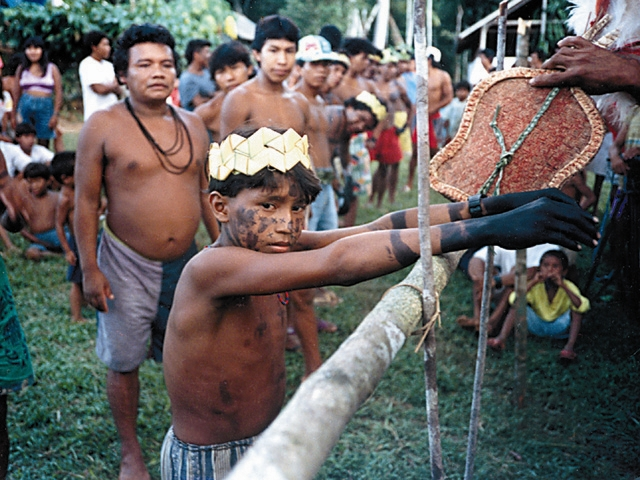
The Mawé people in the Amazon rainforest intentionally use bullet ant stings as a rite of passage into manhood.

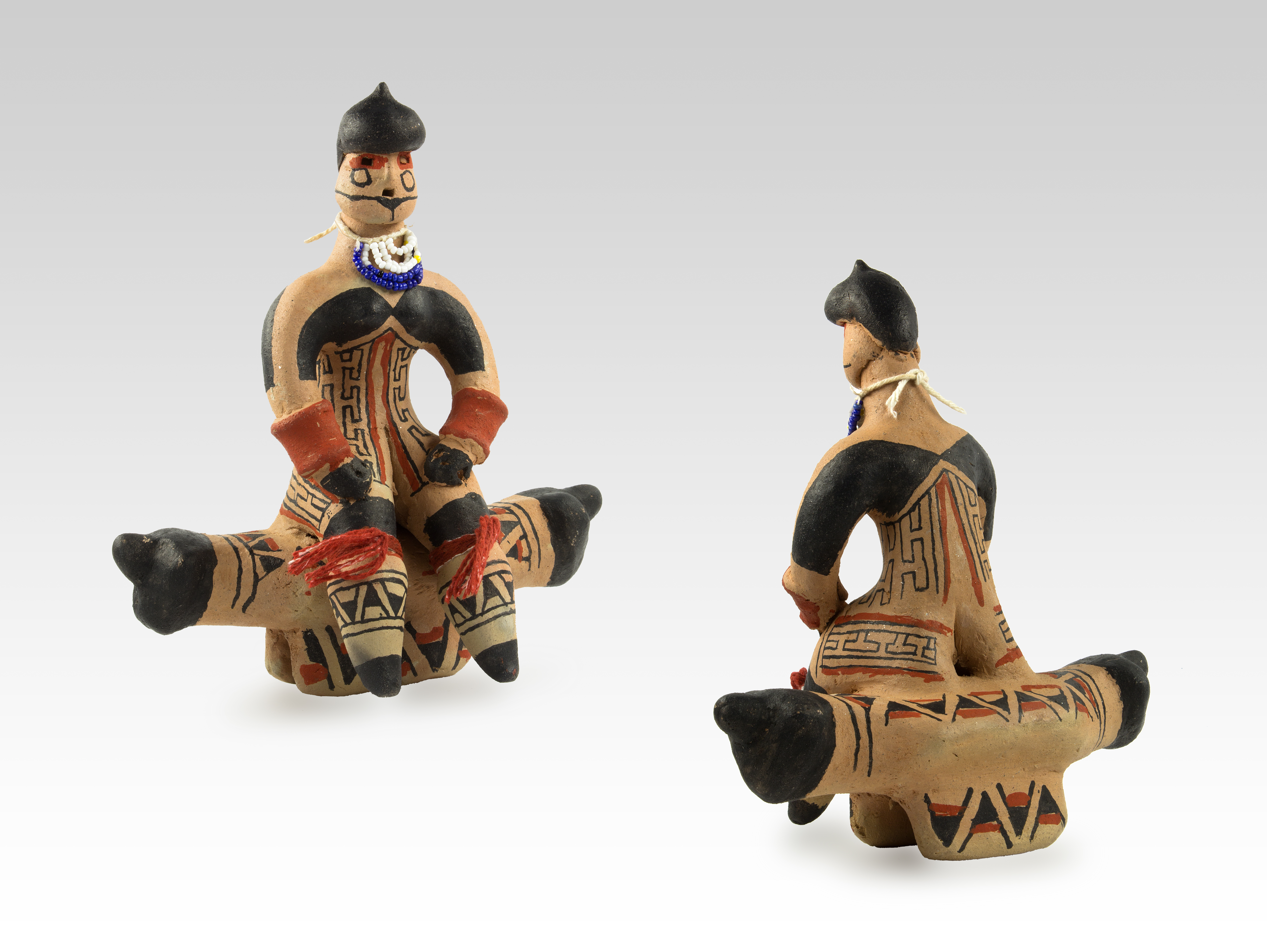
Karajà statuettes

In various tribal and developed societies, entry into an age grade—generally gender-separated—(unlike an age set) is marked by an initiation rite, which may be the crowning of a long and complex preparation, sometimes in retreat.

- Acquisition of a drivers license
- Removal of impacted wisdom teeth
- Bar and Bat Mitzvah
- Breeching, when an infant is put into boy's clothing
- Coming of Age in Unitarian Universalism
- Completion of toilet training
- Débutante ball
- Dokimasia
- First training bra and bra
- First menstruation, i.e. menarche
  - Seclusion of girls at puberty
  - Sevapuneru or Turmeric ceremony
- Graduation
- Matrescence, the transition to motherhood
- Okuyi in several West African nations
- Philippine debut
- Poy Sang Long in Shan Buddhist community
- Quinceañera
- Retirement
- Russefeiring in Norway
- Scarification and various other physical endurances
- Secular coming of age ceremonies for non-religious youngsters who want a rite of passage comparable to the religious rituals like confirmation
- Shichi-Go-San in Japan
- Shinbyu in Burmese Buddhist community
- Sweet Sixteen
- Wedding
- Walkabout

=== Religious ===
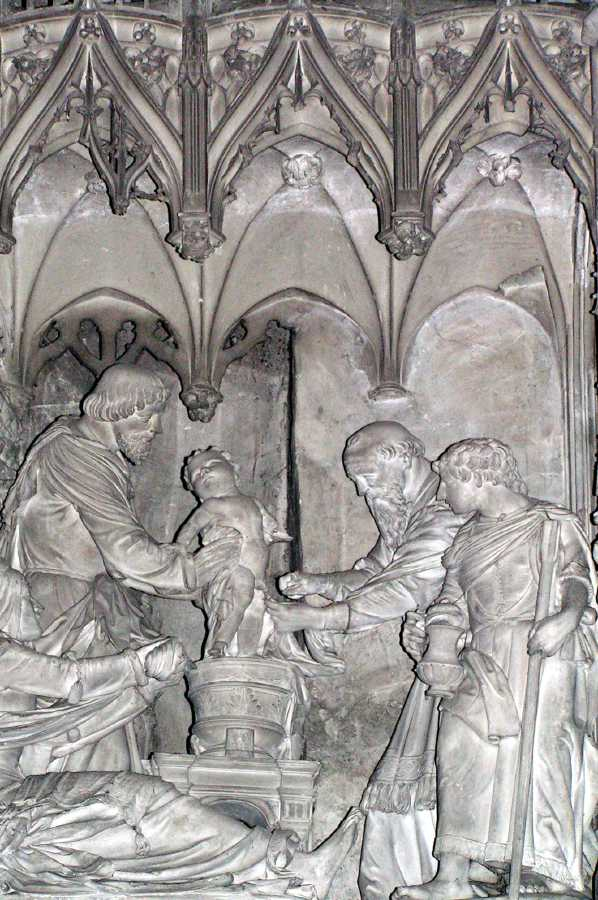
Jesus underwent Jewish circumcision, here depicted in a Catholic cathedral; a liturgical feast commemorates this on New Year's Day

- Amrit Sanchar in Sikhism
- Annaprashana
- Baptism (Christening)
- Bar and Bat Mitzvah in Judaism
- Bwiti
- Circumcision
  - Zeved habat and Bris in Judaism
  - Khitan in Islam
  - In Coptic Christianity, the Ethiopian Orthodox Church and the Eritrean Orthodox Church
- Consecration in Reform Judaism
- Confirmation in Western Christianity and some streams of Judaism
- Diving for the Cross, in some Orthodox Christian churches
- First Communion, First Eucharist and First Confession
- Siddur presentation ceremony in Judaism
- Bible presentation ceremony in several branches of Protestantism
- Hajj in Islam
- Chudakarana, or hair cutting in Hinduism
- Rumspringa
- Sanskara, a series of sacraments in Hinduism
- Shinbyu in Theravada Buddhism
- Vision quest in some Native American cultures
- Okipa in traditional Mandan culture
- Wiccaning in Wicca
- Temple Endowment in the Latter-day Saint tradition

=== Military ===
- Boot camp and officer candidate school are rites of passage from civilian to military life. In the United States Navy's officer candidate school and the United States Marine Corps, drill instructors manufacture stress as a form of training. In the Turkish Armed Forces recruits have an oath taking ceremony as a passage from civilian to military members.
- Blood wings
- Line-crossing ceremony
- Krypteia, a rite involving young Spartans, part of the agoge regime of Spartan education.
- Ephebeia, a training period for young Athenians
- Wetting-down. In the U.S. Navy and Royal Navy, is a ceremony in which a naval officer throws a party for his shipmates upon receiving a promotion.
- Turkish Air Force officers in pilot training are hosed down with water and ordered to do push-ups after completing their first solo flight.

=== Academic ===
- The first day of school, whether the first overall or the first in a specific phase prior to postsecondary education
- Graduation
- Matura

Some academic circles such as dorms, fraternities, teams and other clubs practice hazing, ragging and fagging. Szecskáztatás, a mild form of hazing (usually without physical and sexual abuse), is practiced in some Hungarian secondary schools. First-year junior students are publicly humiliated through embarrassing clothing and senior students branding their faces with marker pens; it is sometimes also a contest, with the winners usually earning the right to organize the next event. Fraternities and sororities, like other private societies, often have codified initiation ceremonies as ritual separating candidates from members.

=== Vocational/professional ===
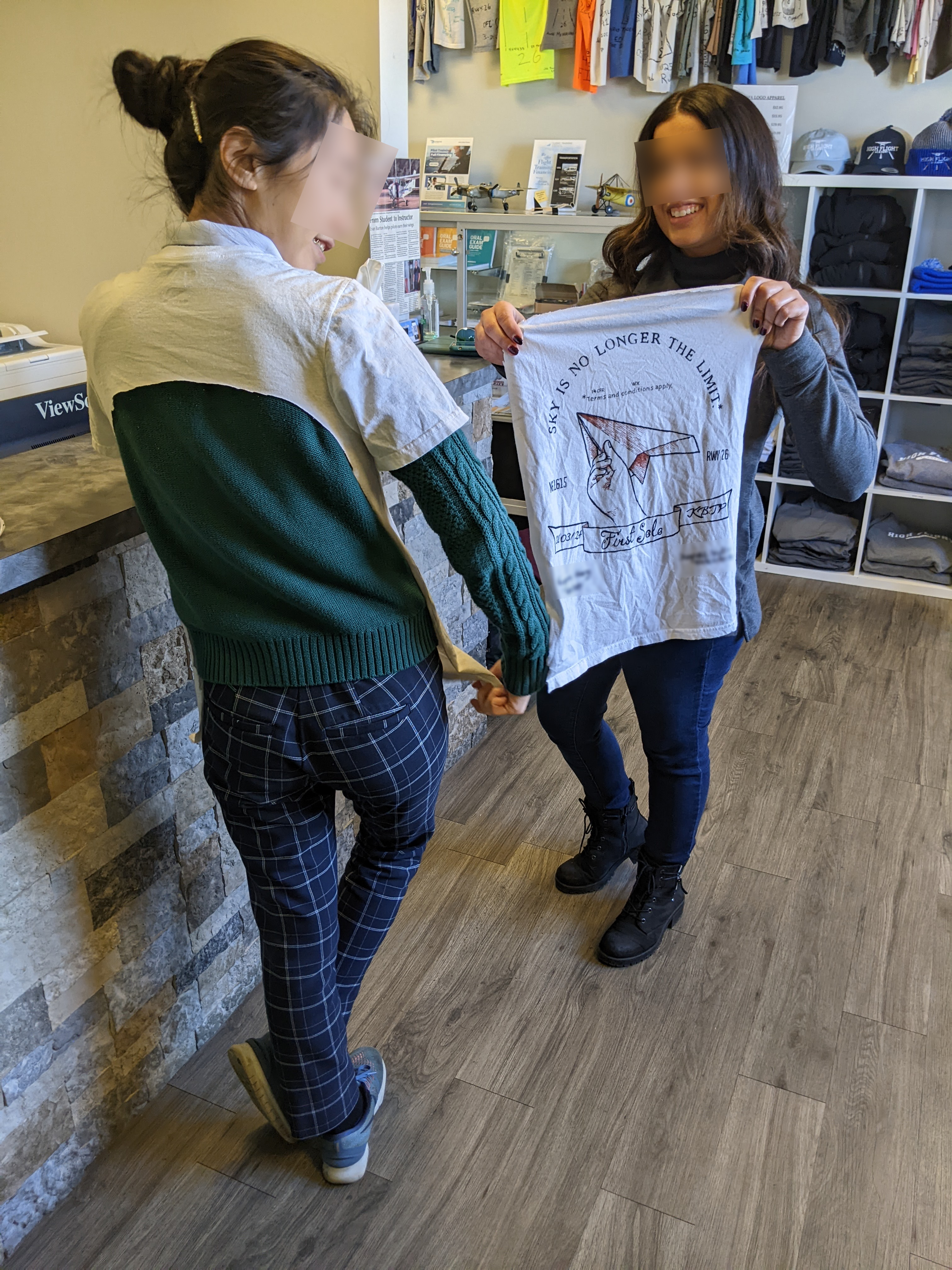
Student pilots will have their shirt back cut off after their first solo flight.

- White coat ceremony in medicine and pharmacy.
- The Ritual of the Calling of an Engineer, also known as the Iron Ring Ceremony
- Walk on Water: Second-year students must pass the competition to continue in the school of architecture at Florida International University in the United States
- A student pilot successfully completing a first solo flight traditionally gets drenched with water and has his or her shirt tail cut off.

=== Sports ===
- Batizados in capoeira
- Black belt in martial arts
- Blooding in fox hunting
- a Major League Baseball player's first hit (The ball is retrieved, labeled, and given to the player as a keepsake.)
- A National Hockey League player's first goal (The puck used to score said goal may be retrieved, labeled, and given to the player as a keepsake.)
- In trap shooting and skeet shooting, the first time a shooter scores 25 straight (perfect score for a round), their hat is thrown in the air and shot down by the other shooters present.

=== Other ===
- Castration in some sects and special castes
- Dental evulsion, among various cultures of Africa, Asia and Oceania.
- Earlier seasons of the television series Survivor typically include a rite of passage prior to the final immunity challenge. Though the specifics of this rite of passage vary based on the customs and traditions of the host country, most rites of passage include a lengthy walk to the final challenge along which the remaining castaways pass the torches of every eliminated contestant from that season. There have been variations on this walk, such as seasons in which the remaining contestants paddle a boat to the final challenge and drop the torches into the ocean along the way.

== See also ==
- Pilgrimage
- Seclusion of girls at puberty
- Female genital mutilation
