= Donation of Pepin =

756 transfer of Frankish territory to the papacy

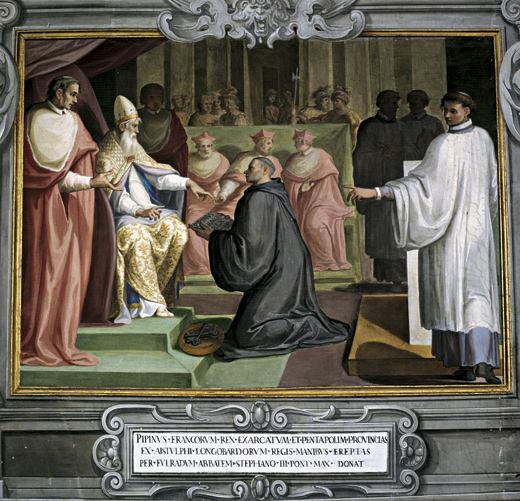
Fresco by a painter from the school of Giovan Battista Ricci, depicting the abbot St. Fulrad giving Pepin's written guarantee to Pope Stephen II.

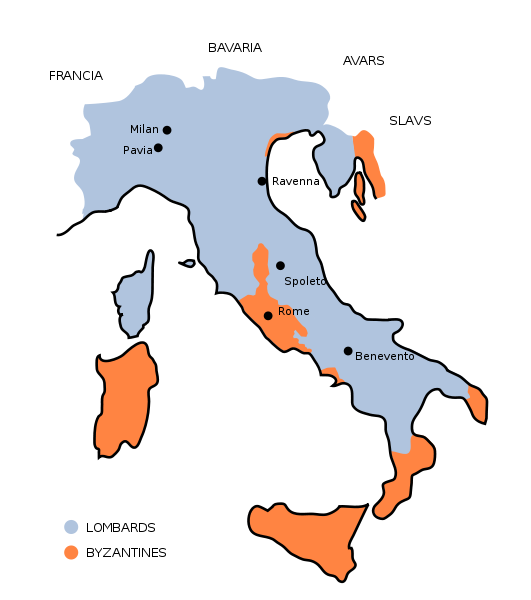
Map of Lombard territories in 756 before the donation

The Donation of Pepin, or Donation of Pippin, was the transfer of Frankish territory in Central Italy to Pope Stephen II made by Pepin the Short, King of the Franks, in 756. Credited with "effectively establishing the temporal authority of the papacy," the Donation took place amid the Byzantine Empire's decline in Italy and marked both "an important moment in the papal–Carolingian alliance" and an "important step" in the formation of the Papal States. With the fall of Ravenna, the imperial capital in Italy, to Aistulf, King of the Lombards in 751, "any semblance of imperial protection for Rome" had vanished and the pope, who had technically been a Byzantine subject to this point, turned to Pepin for assistance. The pope had first appealed to Byzantine Emperor Constantine V, but without success. Pepin invaded Italy and, following an initial victory in 755, he decisively "defeated Aistulf and imposed a peace on him" in 756.

Pepin had promised Italian lands to Stephen II during a meeting at Quierzy, France in April 754. While this earlier promise is "often identified as the Donation," it may have only been verbal and "does not exist in written form." Papal accounts of the 754 promise state that Pepin "granted the pope the exarchate, including Ravenna, and the Roman duchy." In 756, the "Confession of St. Peter," a document listing the cities involved in the Donation, was "placed on the altar of Old St. Peter's Basilica in Rome" along with "keys of the cities and territories in central Italy." The Confession document was created "following Pippin's second invasion of Italy to assist the pope." After his initial invasion in 755, Pepin had concluded the First Peace of Pavia, but Aistulf "refused to abide by" this agreement and attacked Rome. Pepin then defeated Aistulf again, imposing "heavy penalties" with the Second Peace of Pavia in 756.

The Donation extended the temporal rule of the popes beyond the duchy of Rome, establishing the "Frankish Papacy" and providing a legal basis for the creation of the Papal States. The Donation was subsequently "confirmed by Pippin's successors, Charlemagne and Louis the Pious, in 778 and 817 respectively," as both "sought to strengthen their ties with the pope." Although the Donation "involved territories that were technically not Pippin's to give," the inability of the Byzantine Empire to control these lands signalled that "the imperial presence in central Italy" was at an end. The Donation of Pepin came at a "critical time in the history of the early Middle Ages," and "had a significant impact on the history of the papal states." The Donation prompted debate "at the time as well as in subsequent historiography" due to the "symbolic importance of the cities involved" and the "practicalities of seeing the agreement implemented," since the donation did not adhere to the Quierzy statement exactly. It has also sparked debate regarding the credibility of the manuscript in which it was referenced. Some scholars take issue with the terminology due to the fact the lands in question were not "donated" in the traditional sense.

== Background ==
In 751, Aistulf, king of the Lombards, conquered what remained of the exarchate of Ravenna, the last vestige of the Roman Empire in northern Italy. In 752, Aistulf demanded the submission of Rome and a tribute of one gold solidus per capita. Pope Stephen II and a Roman envoy, the silentiary John, tried through negotiations and bribes to convince Aistulf to back down. When this failed, Stephen led a solemn procession through the streets of Rome and nailed the treaty which Aistulf had violated to a crucifix. He then sent envoys to Pepin the Short, king of the Franks, with a letter requesting his support and the provision of a Frankish escort so that Stephen could go to Pepin to confer. At the time, the Franks were on good terms with the Lombards.

In 753, John the Silentiary returned from Constantinople to Rome with an imperial order (iussio) that Pope Stephen accompany him to meet Aistulf in the Lombard capital of Pavia. The pope duly requested and received a letter of transit from the Lombards. With the Frankish envoys who had by then arrived, the pope and the imperial envoy set out for Pavia on 14 October 753. The Roman magnates did not accompany them past the border of the duchy of Rome. At Pavia, Aistulf denied the requests of Stephen and John to return the conquered exarchate to the empire, but he did not prevent Stephen from continuing with the Frankish envoys to the court of Pepin. They left Pavia on 15 November 753. John the Silentiary did not accompany them. This was the first time a pope had crossed the Alps. The decision to act independently of the imperial envoy was of the immense moment. It is likely that the pope saw himself as acting on behalf of the Italian province subjugated and threatened by Aistulf.

== Original promise ==
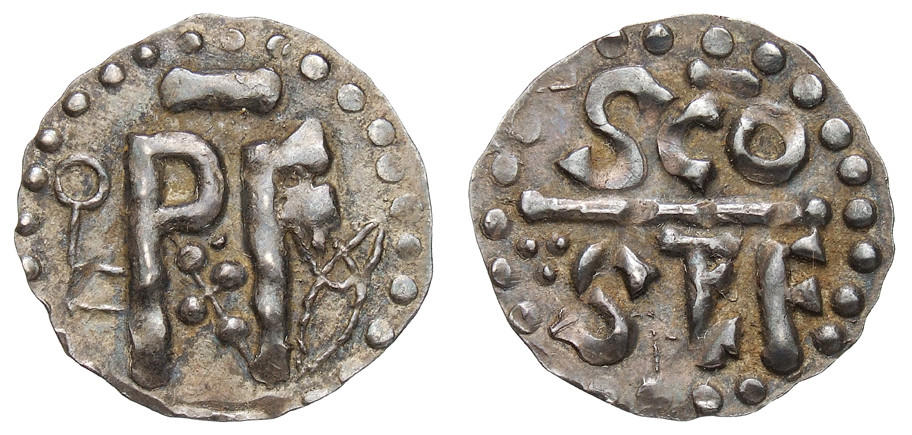
Carolingian coin of Pepin the Short, dating from 754/55 to 768.

Due to military pressure from the Lombards, in late 753 Pope Stephen II, Pope Zacharias' successor, implored Pippin to defend Rome. Pope Stephen met Pepin the Short at the royal estate at Ponthion on 6 January 754. The king led the Pope's horse, while the pope in sackcloth and ashes bowed down and asked Pepin "that in accordance with the peace treaties [between Rome and the Lombards] he would support the suit of St Peter and of the republic of the Romans". Pepin responded by promising "to restore the exarchate of Ravenna and the rights and territories of the republic". The exact nature of this commitment cannot be known, but it is unlikely that Pepin had in mind the Roman Empire. It has been suggested that the two parties exchanged oaths on this occasion, but that is unlikely.

Over the next two years, Pepin dispatched three embassies to Aistulf demanding that he honour his treaties with the Romans. In April 754, he held a general assembly at Quierzy-sur-Oise. Some noblemen left the proceedings in opposition to the policy, but Pepin restated publicly his promise to the Pope and enumerated the territories that he would restore. Afterwards, this promise was put into writing. On 28 July in the Basilica of Saint-Denis, the Pope anointed Pepin and his sons Charles and Carloman as kings of the Franks and patricians of the Romans. He also pronounced a blessing on Queen Bertrada and the assembled nobility. The pope's right to grant the patrician title is doubtful. The 754 anointing also had a sacramental element, giving the king "a place and function in the church with duties, privileges and responsibilities" that would manifest over time through the Franco-Papal alliance.

== Military actions ==
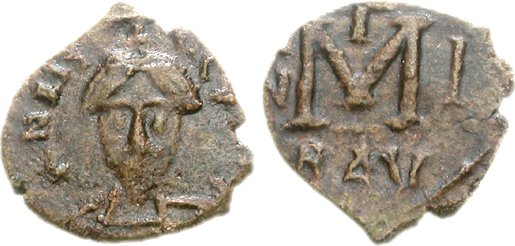
A follis coin of King Aistulf, dating from 749 to 756.

In the spring of 755, Pepin summoned the army to muster at Braisne-sur-Vesle. He sent envoys ahead to offer Aistulf an indemnity if he restored the Roman territories he had taken in violation of his treaties. The Frankish army crossed the Mont Cénis and defeated the Lombard army near Susa. Aistulf submitted to some form of Frankish overlordship and promised under oath to return Ravenna and the other cities he had occupied to the Pope. The peace treaty was signed by the "Romans, Franks, and Lombards" without direct reference to the Empire.

As soon as the Frankish army left Italy, Aistulf disregarded the treaty. On 1 January 756, he put Rome under siege. The Pope appealed to the Franks in a series of letters to Pippin about the Lombard threat, which includes the pope claiming that "a good name," or title "means to dispute with all energy for the enhancement of the holy Church of God," since God favors those who are "loyal adherents and defenders of his holy Church." Recorded by the Codex Carolinus, the letters detail the pope's perspective of the Lombard presence. In 755, one letter to Pippin describes the pope's motives for writing, prompted by the "many trials" of Rome due to the "wicked King Aistulf of the Lombards." The pope references the Quierzy document, established in 754, mentioning that "through a charter of donation" the king's "goodness has been confirmed that restitution should be made." He urges the king that "hasten to restore and hand over to blessed Peter" what was promised in the donation, and what the king "once promised blessed Peter." In a separate letter addressed on February 24, 756, he mentions how the earlier peace treaty established after Pippin first came to the pope's aid has been "overthrown" by Aistulf. Rome, he mentions, is surrounded by the Lombards, and have set fire to the "churches of God, casting the most holy images of the saints into the fire." The pope is imploring Pippin to come to their aid again, asking him not to abandon Rome so that the Lord does not abandon him, with "all possible haste and the greatest speed." The letters from Pope Stephen II to the Frankish king Pippin III regarding the increasing threat of Lombard invasion are "crucial sources for the commencement and early years of the Franco-papal alliance" and "the emergence of the Papal States."

After three months, Aistulf abandoned the blockade. In April, a Frankish army invaded Italy again and defeated the Lombards. Aistulf was forced to give hostages and pay annual tribute to the Franks. He also had to promise in writing to return the occupied territories to the Pope.

== Final agreement ==
The treaty officially conferred upon the pope the territories belonging to Ravenna, even cities such as Forlì with their hinterlands, the Lombard conquests in the Romagna and in the Duchy of Spoleto and Benevento, and the Pentapolis (the "five cities" of Rimini, Pesaro, Fano, Senigallia and Ancona). Narni and Ceccano were former papal territories. The territories specified in the treaty of 756 had belonged to the Roman Empire. Envoys of the Empire met Pepin in Pavia and offered him a large sum of money to restore the lands to the Empire, but he refused, saying that they belonged to St Peter and the Roman church. The boundaries of the grant to the Pope can only be approximated, since the text of the treaty has not survived. It is possible that the boundaries were the same as those in a previous Imperial–Lombard treaty. Abbot Fulrad was charged with collecting the keys of the cities to be handed over and depositing them along with the written agreement on the tomb of St Peter.

The Donations made the Pope a temporal ruler for the first time. This strip of territory extended diagonally across Italy from the Tyrrhenian to the Adriatic Sea. Over these extensive and mountainous territories the medieval Popes were unable to exercise effective sovereignty, given the pressures of the times.

== Charlemagne ==
The relationship between Charlemagne, the Carolingians, and the papacy was also developing around the time of the Donation. Bertrada, wife of Pippin III, utilized her young son Charles, later known as Charlemagne, to maintain the peace established with the Lombards. She arranged for Charlemagne's marriage to a daughter of the Lombard king Desiderius. Pope Stephen II was against this match, but Bertrada reassured the pope that the pairing would not harm the Frankish relationship with Rome, St. Peter's see, or the pope's status. However, for reasons unknown, Charles reneged on his agreement to marry the Lombard princess. The rejection of his daughter humiliated Desiderius and strengthened the Franco-Papal alliance on the "more traditional anti-Lombard terms."

When Charlemagne came to power in 771, he continued to protect St. Peter's see by invading Rome. In 773, Pope Hadrian I requested assistance against the Lombards just like Pope Stephen had years a few decades earlier. Charlemagne came to the aid of the pope in 774 and besieged the Lombard capital, Pavia. After his successful conquest of the Lombards, which added Italy from the Alps to Rome to the Carolingian kingdom, Charlemagne received the title of King of the Lombards once their prior king, Desiderius, had surrendered. Charlemagne was different from his father or other Frankish kings in that he claimed to be both secular and spiritual lord of his domains, unlike other rulers who kept these designations separate.

== See also ==
- Donation of Constantine, a forged Roman imperial decree by which the 4th-century emperor Constantine the Great supposedly transferred authority over Rome and the western part of the Roman Empire to the Pope.

== Sources ==
- Noble, Thomas F. X. (1984). The Republic of St. Peter: The Birth of the Papal State, 680–825.
- Partner, Peter (1972). The Lands of St. Peter: The Papal State in the Middle Ages and the Early Renaissance. University of California Press.
- Ullmann, Walter (1962). The Growth of Papal Government in the Middle Ages: A Study in the Ideological Relation of Clerical to Lay Power.
