= Wetting-down =

U.S. Navy ceremony

Wetting-down is a raucous ceremony for newly promoted officers observed in the U.S. and Royal navies, and the U.S. Coast Guard. The U.S. Marines, National Oceanic and Atmospheric Administration Corps, and U.S. Public Health Service officers also participate in this custom as homage to their naval heritage.

== Procedure ==
The wetting-down celebration is consistently paid for and hosted by the newly promoted officer, who invites their friends, which usually include several officers of the same rank at which they have most recently served. It is customary for the officer to spend the difference between their pay at their old rank and their pay at the new rank on the bar tab for their guests.

Normally the party occurs at a bar or pub frequented by officers. Being located in a bar, there is typically a great deal of drinking of alcohol. There must always be at least one ceremonial toast. Friends present several rowdy speeches expressing their appreciation of the new officer's good comradeship and endearing faults. Often one of the speeches describes an embarrassing event in the new officer's career which occurred under the old rank, although this latter variety of speech is sometimes discouraged in order to avoid providing evidence pertinent to a disciplinary hearing.

== Improvisations ==
A wetting-down party is informal and improvisations on the ceremony are the rule, not the exception. The senior officer present may make the final speech, or if present, the commanding officer who made the promotion can make the final speech. Sometimes the final speech is presented by the new officer's father, especially if he has served in a navy. Although, for particularly exuberant wetting-down parties, parents and senior officers are not usually invited and the honor falls to one of the new officer's close friends.

== History ==
The "wetting down" for such a party term comes from the historical practice of wetting new rank insignia to give it a more weathered appearance. In most navies, officers's rank insignia consists of gold braiding in the form of stripes on the cuff, epaulets, and (historically) arrangements of gold braid on buttonholes, collars, etc. Upon promotion, a newly added stripe or epaulet would stand out against the more weathered gold braiding already on the uniform. Newly promoted officers would literally soak the new gold braid (usually with either seawater or an alcoholic beverage) to make it appear older so that the promotion would not look as recent. Modern wetting down parties may or may not include some version of, or homage to, this ritual, such as pouring beer over the officer's head or forcing them to jump fully-uniformed into the ocean.

== See also ==
- Rite of passage
