= Divine king =

Divine king may refer to:

- Sacred king, a human monarch with religious significance
- God king, a monarch who is also a deity
