= God king =

God king, or God-King, is a terminology for a ruler that is venerated as a deity. In particular, it is used to refer to:

- the Egyptian pharaohs (although most pharaohs were not considered deities)
- Devaraja
- a sacred king in any other polytheistic faith

== See also ==
- Divine king (disambiguation)
- Euhemerism
- God emperor (disambiguation)
- Imperial cult
- List of people who have been considered deities
- List of pharaohs deified during lifetime
- Theocracy
