= God emperor =

God-Emperor or God Emperor may refer to:

== Historical and legendary ==
- Three Sovereigns and Five Emperors, a group of mythological rulers or deities in ancient northern China said to be god emperors
- Sapa Inca, the emperor of the Inca Empire, viewed as a god
- An emperor worshipped as a deity by an imperial cult
  - Imperial cult (ancient Rome) identified emperors with divinely sanctioned authority
- Emperor Jimmu, first emperor of Japan according to legend
  - Emperor of Japan, called Tennō, "heavenly sovereign"

== Modern popular culture ==
- God Emperor of Dune, the fourth novel in Frank Herbert's Dune series
  - Leto II Atreides, the title character of the novel, introduced in the previous novel
- The God-Emperor of Mankind, in the science fantasy universe, Warhammer 40,000, first published in 1987
- The Emperor, the godlike character in Andreas Eschbach's The Carpet Makers (2005)
- God Emperor Doom, from Marvel's Secret Wars (2015 comic book)
- God-Emperor, character in The Last Remnant role-playing video game
- God Emperor Trump, a statue of, and term for, US President Donald Trump.

== See also ==
- Christ Pantocrator, a specific depiction of Christ
- Caesaropapism, the idea of combining the power of secular government with the religious power
- Divine right of kings
- God king, a term for a deified ruler
- List of people who have been considered deities
- Mandate of Heaven
- Sacred king
