= Camposagrado Palace =

Camposagrado Palace may refer to the following palaces in Spain:

- Camposagrado Palace (Oviedo) -a baroque and Neo-classical palace located in the town of Oviedo, in Asturias, Spain
- Camposagrado Palace (Avilés) - a baroque-style palace located in Avilés in Asturias, Spain
