= Pagi =

Pagi may refer to:

== People ==
- Antoine Pagi (1624–1699), French ecclesiastical historian
- François Pagi (1654–1721), French Franciscan historian of the Catholic Church
- Mickaël Pagis (born 1973), French footballer
- Ranchordas Pagi (1901–2013), Indian Army scout

== Other uses ==
- pagi, plural of pagus, a Roman administrative term designating a rural subdivision of a tribal territory
- Pagi language, spoken in Papua New Guinea
- Pagi (title), a title used by the Koli caste in Gujarat
- PAGI, a 1940s Israeli ideological and political movement

== See also ==
- Pagoi, a village in Corfu
- Buntot Pagi, or stingray tail, a type of Filipino whiplike weapon
- Nuansa Pagi, an Indonesian TV newscast
- Pasar pagi, a type of traditional market in Indonesia and Malaysia
