= Bishops of Rome under Constantine the Great =

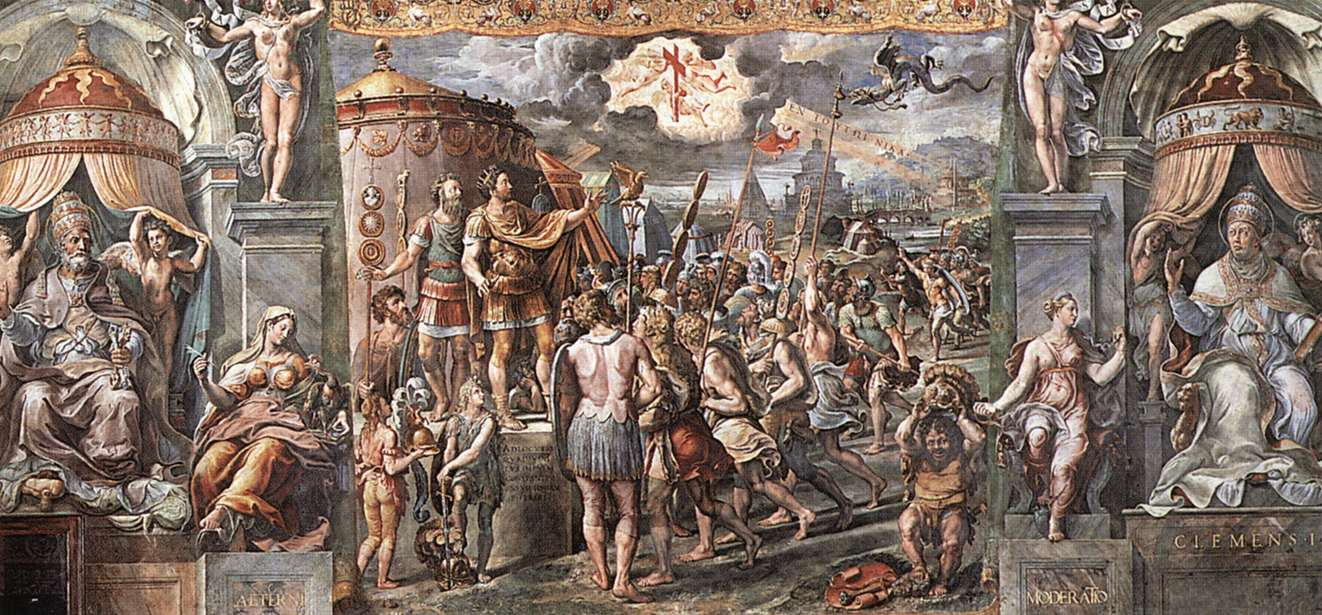
Raphael's The Vision of the Cross depicts a cross instead of the Chi Rho.

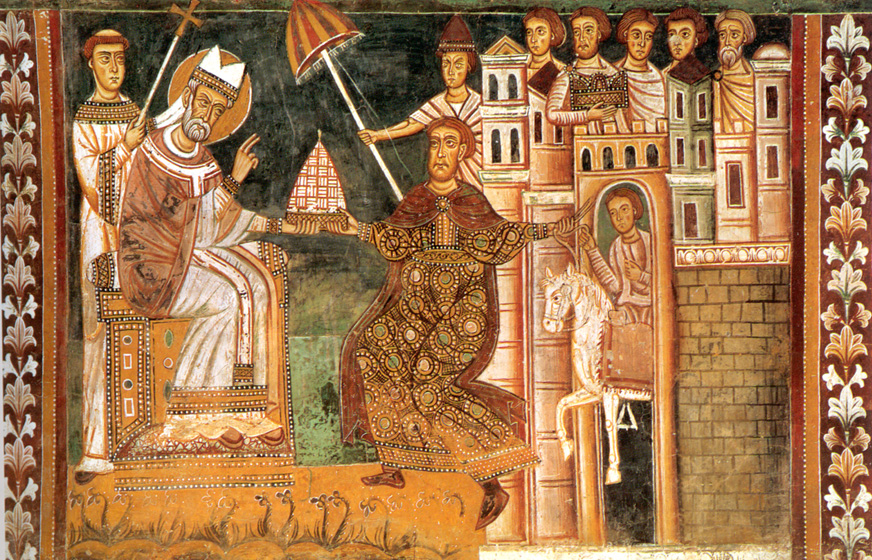
A fresco in the Benedictine monastery of Santi Quattro Coronati depicts Constantine offering his crown to Sylvester.

Constantine the Great's (272–337) relationship with the four Bishops of Rome during his reign is an important component of the history of the Papacy, and more generally the history of the Catholic Church.

The legend surrounding Constantine I's victory in the Battle of the Milvian Bridge (312) relates his vision of the Chi Rho (☧) and the text in hoc signo vinces in the sky and his reproducing this symbol on the shields of his troops. The following year Constantine and Licinius proclaimed the toleration of Christianity with the Edict of Milan, and in 325 Constantine convened and presided over the First Council of Nicaea, the first ecumenical council. None of this, however, has particularly much to do with the popes, who did not even attend the council; in fact, the first bishop of Rome to be contemporaneously referred to as "Pope" (πάππας, or pappas) is Damasus I (366–384). Moreover, between 324 and 330, he built Constantinople as a new capital for the empire, and—with no apologies to the Roman community of Christians—relocated key Roman families and translated many Christian relics to the new churches.

The Donation of Constantine, an 8th-century forgery used to enhance the prestige and authority of popes, places the pope more centrally in the narrative of Constantinian Christianity. The legend of the Donation claims that Constantine offered his crown to Sylvester I (314–335), and even that Sylvester baptized Constantine. In reality, Constantine was baptized (nearing his death in May 337) by Eusebius of Nicomedia, who, unlike the pope, was an Arian bishop of Constantinople. Sylvester was succeeded by Mark (336) and Julius I (337–352) during the life of Constantine.

Although the "Donation" never occurred, Constantine did hand over the Lateran Palace to the bishop of Rome, and began the construction of Old Saint Peter's Basilica (the "Constantinian Basilica"). The gift of the Lateran probably occurred during the reign of Miltiades (311–314), Sylvester I's predecessor, who began using it as his residence. Old St. Peter's was begun between 326 and 330 and would have taken three decades to complete, long after the death of Constantine. Constantine's legalization of Christianity, combined with the donation of these properties, gave the bishop of Rome an unprecedented level of temporal power, for the first time creating an incentive for secular leaders to interfere with papal succession.

== Background ==
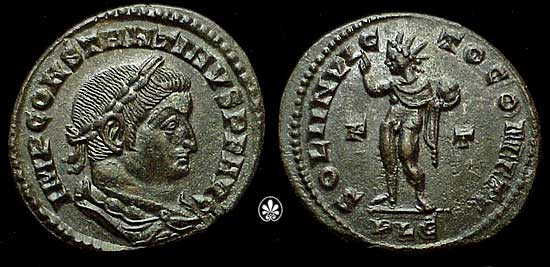
The coins of Constantine continued to depict Roman god Sol Invictus ("Unconquered Sun") until about 315.

In spite of the Diocletian Persecution, Christians constituted approximately one-tenth of the population of the Roman Empire at the time of Constantine's rise to power. Christianity was legalized by Galerius, who was the first emperor to issue an edict of toleration for all religious creeds including Christianity in April 311. Eamon Duffy characterizes the church in Rome before Constantine as "not one congregation, but a loose constellation of churches based in private houses or, as time went on and the community grew, meeting in rented halls in markets and public baths. It was without any single dominant ruling officer, its elders or leaders sharing responsibility, but distributing tasks, like that of foreign correspondent. By the eve of the conversion of Constantine, there were more than two dozen of these religious community-centers or tituli".

The Roman church was a small community, and its bishop exercised little influence outside its members in the time of Constantine. Constantine was the first Roman Emperor to embrace Christianity, although he likely continued in his pre-Christian beliefs. He and co-Emperor Licinius bestowed imperial favor on Christianity through the Edict of Milan promulgated in 313. After the Edict of Milan, the church adopted the same governmental structure as the Empire: geographical provinces ruled by bishops. These bishops of important cities (Metropolitan bishops) therefore rose in power over the bishops of lesser cities (later called Suffragan bishops).

Whatever his personal beliefs, Constantine's political interest in Christianity was as a unifying force and his policy of "the imposition of unity on the churches at all costs" soon set him on a "collision course with the popes."

== Popes under Constantine ==
=== Miltiades ===
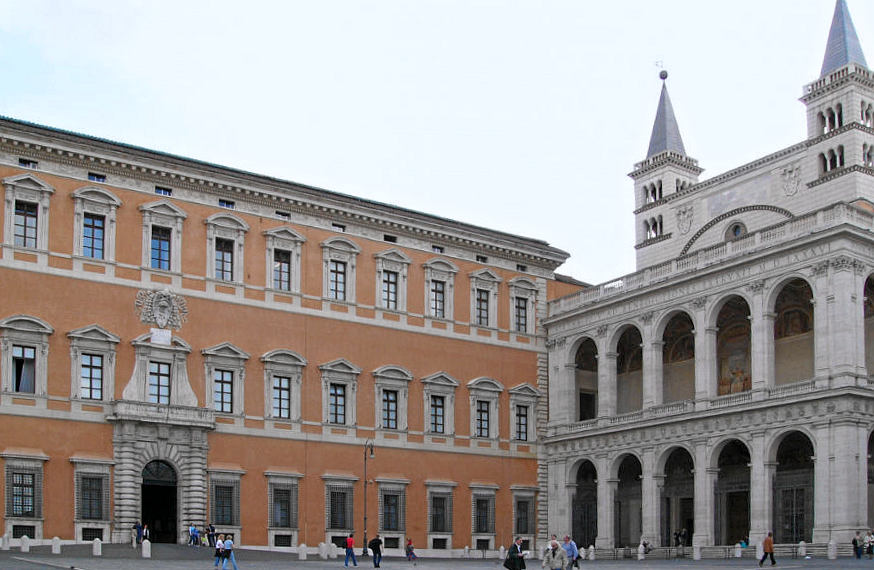
The modern facade of the Lateran Palace

Miltiades (311–314) was pope at the time of Constantine's victory, and Constantine gifted to Miltiades the Lateran Palace, where he relocated, holding a synod in 313. Constantine designated Miltiades as one of four bishops to adjudicate the case of the Donatists, but he had no authority to decide the case or publish the result without the approval of the emperor himself. Customarily, the African bishops may have gone to the bishop of Rome as a respected, neutral figure, but it was well known that Miltiades would not agree with the Donatist position that ordination by a "traitor" bishop would invalidate the sacrament.

Turning to Constantine was a strange move because he had not yet been baptized, and word of his budding conversion may not yet have reached Alexandria. Constantine therefore referred the matter to Miltiades, requiring him to collaborate with three bishops from Gaul. Eamon Duffy calls this the "first direct intervention by an emperor in the affairs of the church." When Miltiades invited fifteen additional Italian bishops to participate in the synod and ruled against the Donatists, they appealed to Constantine again, who called for a new synod in Arles, this time headed by the bishops of Arles and Syracuse.

=== Sylvester I ===
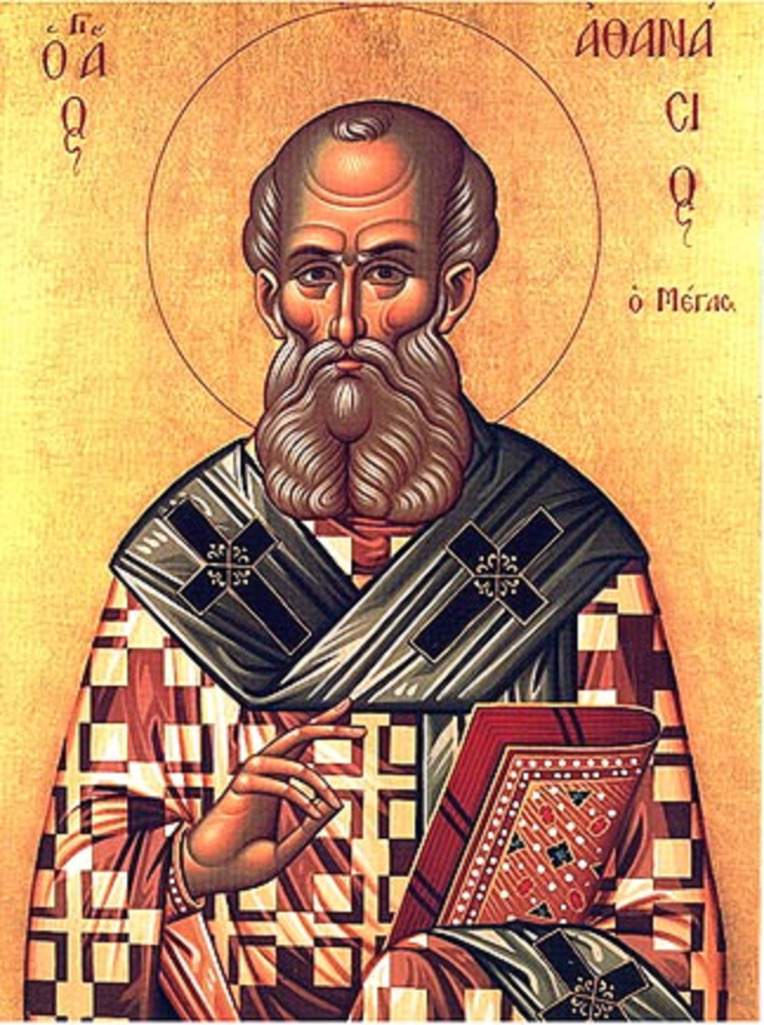
Athanasius of Alexandria

Miltiades died, and his successor, Sylvester I (313–335), did not travel to Arles. The Arles synod gave Silvester I somewhat of a nod by asking him to circulate their decisions to the other bishops, although he had no part in the process. During Silvester I's reign, construction began on the Lateran Basilica, Santa Croce in Gerusalemme, and St. Peter's. Silvester did not attend the first ecumenical council, the First Council of Nicaea (325), but sent two priests as his representatives; the Western bishops of Carthage and Milan were also in attendance.

Silvester would have viewed Arianism as a heresy; Constantine himself probably did not understand the complex theological issues in dispute, although he had surrounded himself with many followers of Arius, including Bishop Eusebius of Nicomedia, his eventual baptizer. Arius's followers did poorly at Nicaea, and the Nicene Creed that was adopted was squarely against their Christological position. The Arians were "silenced, not persuaded" by the council, and the controversy in the larger Christian community was not resolved. The Arian position would persist in the East for three generations, and even eventually be adopted by Constantine's son, Constantius II. Constantine himself supported the Nicene position mainly because it was "his Council", and sought a compromise text that would "paper over the differences between the two sides." Eusebius remained an Arian, although he assured Constantine his views were compatible with his interpretation of the Nicene Creed, and baptized Constantine in 337.

The chief supporter of the Nicene Creed was Bishop Athanasius of Alexandria, but in 335 he was deposed and exiled to Gaul over unrelated fears about the Egyptian corn supply to Constantinople. His followers were rounded up and picked off. The key debates in Nicaea had been conducted in the Greek language, with the subtleties of particular words inciting great controversy; the Latin language of the West simply "did not yet even possess adequate terminology to handle the debate properly." The pope's legates signed onto the findings of the council, and it continued to be supported by the next two popes, just as followers of Athanasius remained welcome in Rome, but the theological issues were little examined in the West.

=== Mark ===
Mark (336) was the first to designate the bishop of Ostia as the first among the consecrators of the new bishop of Rome (the bishop of Ostia is currently the Dean of the College of Cardinals).

=== Julius I ===
The influence of Constantine would help solidify a strong role for the Roman emperor in the selection process: Constantine chose Julius I (337–352) for all intents and purposes, and his son Constantius II exiled Liberius and installed Felix II (an Arian) as his successor.

Julius I received Athanasius, and invited the Arian Eastern bishops then in Antioch to join him in Rome. The Eastern bishops would have regarded Julius I as having an equal dignity to their own episcopate, but were not pleased that he took into his communion a bishop condemned by an Eastern synod.

== Aftermath ==
Under Pope Liberius (352–366), the Arian conflict between the emperor and bishop of Rome culminated in the Synod of Arles (353), convened by Constantius II. Therein, Liberius's legates signed a declaration condemning the Council of Nicaea. When Liberius himself refused to cooperate, he was exiled. Pope Damasus, (366–384) was able to largely suppress the Arians with the help of Emperor Theodosius, Gregory of Nazianzus, Gregory of Nyssa, and Ambrose of Milan.

== Historiography ==
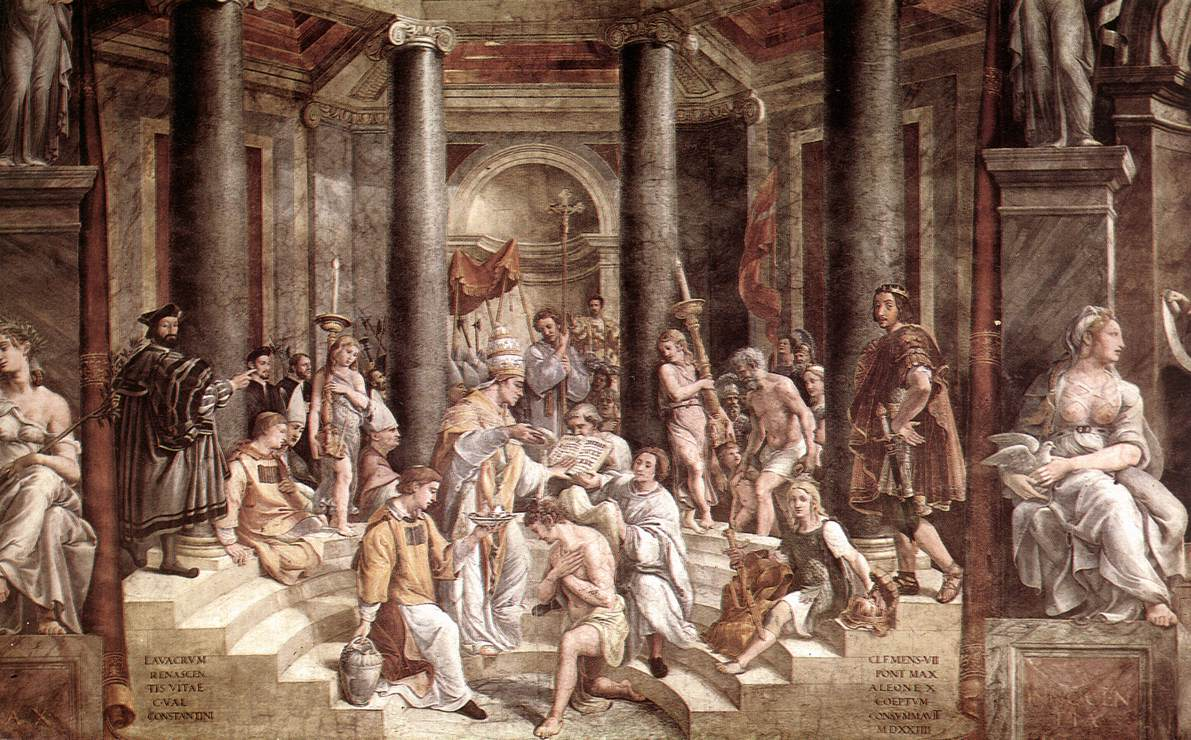
Raphael's The Baptism of Constantine depicts Sylvester I instead of Arian bishop Eusebius of Nicomedia, Constantine's actual baptizer.

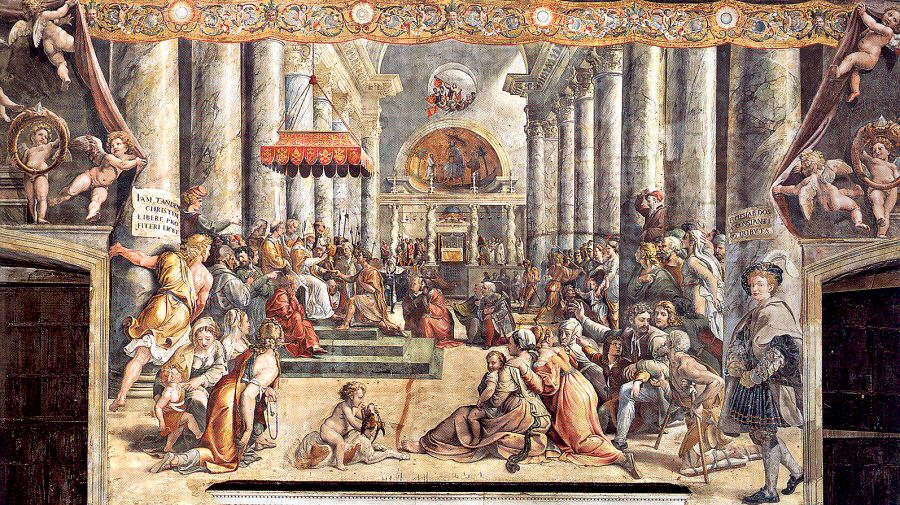
Raphael's The Donation of Constantine depicts the inside St. Peter's, which was not completed before Constantine's death.

The Donation of Constantine purported to memorialize the transfer to Sylvester I and his successors of dominion over the entire Western Roman Empire for the consideration of Sylvester I's instruction of Constantine in Christianity, baptism of Constantine, and curing Constantine of leprosy. Constantine allegedly kept for himself only the Eastern Roman Empire. The forgery was probably constructed during the Frankish Papacy, when Pope Stephen II became the first pope to cross the Alps to crown Pepin the Short, who issued the Donation of Pepin (a non-forgery), granting the pope control of the lands of the Lombards, which coalesced into the first fragments of the Papal States.

It was not long before the document was denounced as a forgery, notably by Otto III, Holy Roman Emperor (r. 983–1002). By the mid 15th century, not even the popes themselves regarded the document as genuine. Italian humanist Lorenzo Valla further proved its falsity in 1440 by showing that its Latin language did not correspond to that of the 4th century. The "Donation" purports to acknowledge the primacy of Rome over Antioch, Jerusalem, Alexandria, and Constantinople, even though the last of these had not even been founded at the time of the claimed Donation.

The myth of the "Donation of Constantine" is embellished further in a 5th-century hagiographic text Vita S Silvestri (or Actus S Silvestri). Among other things, the document claims that Silvester I slew a dragon that had been threatening Rome. The text says that all of these events occurred right after Constantine's entry into the city following the Battle of the Milvian Bridge, despite the fact that Silvester I did not become bishop until 314. These events were incorporated uncritically into the Liber pontificalis c. 530. John Malalas further embellished the story in his Chronicon, which claimed that Silvester I baptized not only Constantine, but his mother Helena, and—for good measure—a large group of his relatives and Roman bystanders. Theophanes the Confessor in his Chronicle c. 815-820 adds Constantine's son Crispus to the list and viciously attacks contrary accounts as Arian lies; Theophanes refers to the Lateran Baptistery as the "Baptistry of Constantine."

Pope Pius V's Breviarum Romanum (1568) and Pope Gregory XIII's Martyrologium Romanum (1584) also asserted that Silvester I was the baptizer of Constantine. When Pope Sixtus V erected the Egyptian obelisk to the north of the Lateran Basilica in 1588, he added to the base the inscription "Constantine was baptized here." Cardinal Cesare Baroni continued to claim this in his Annales Ecclesiastici (1592) and a French author has claimed this as recently as 1906.

This falsified version of Constantine's baptism has found its way into a great deal of ecclesiastical art. Depictions include the Stavelot Triptych (c. 1165), frescoes in I Santi Quattro Coronati, stained glass in the St Michael and All Angels' Church, Ashton-under-Lyne, and—most famously—Raphael's The Baptism of Constantine in the Raphael Rooms of the Apostolic Palace.
