= Annales Ecclesiastici =

Chronicle of Christian history (published 1588–1607)

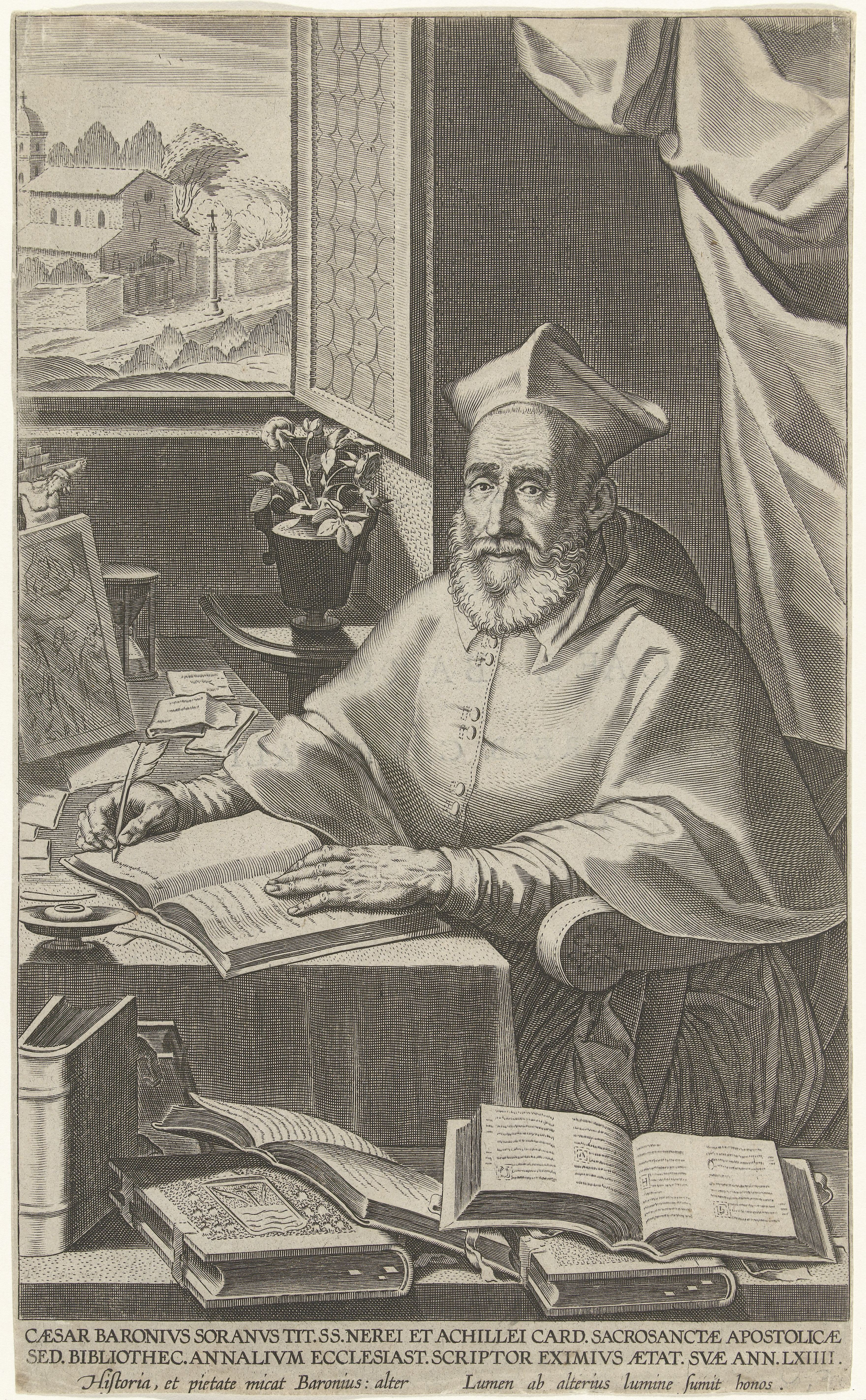
Cesare Baronius, 17th-century engraving by Philippe Galle.

Annales Ecclesiastici (full title Annales ecclesiastici a Christo nato ad annum 1198; "Ecclesiastical annals from Christ's nativity to 1198"), consisting of twelve folio volumes, is a history of the first 12 centuries of the Christian Church, written by Caesar Baronius and Odorico Raynaldi and published between 1588 and 1607.

== Significance ==
The Annales were first published between 1588 and 1607. This work functioned as an official response to the Lutheran Historia Ecclesiae Christi (History of the Church of Christ). In that work the Magdeburg theologians surveyed the history of the Christian church in order to demonstrate how the Catholic Church represented the Antichrist and had deviated from the beliefs and practices of the early church. In turn, the Annales fully supported the claims of the papacy to lead the unique true church.

Before Baronius was appointed Librarian of the Vatican in 1597, he had access to material and sources in its archives that were previously unpublished or unused. He used these in the development of his work. Accordingly, the documentation in Annales Ecclesiastici is considered by most as extremely useful and complete. Lord Acton called it "the greatest history of the Church ever written."

== First edition ==
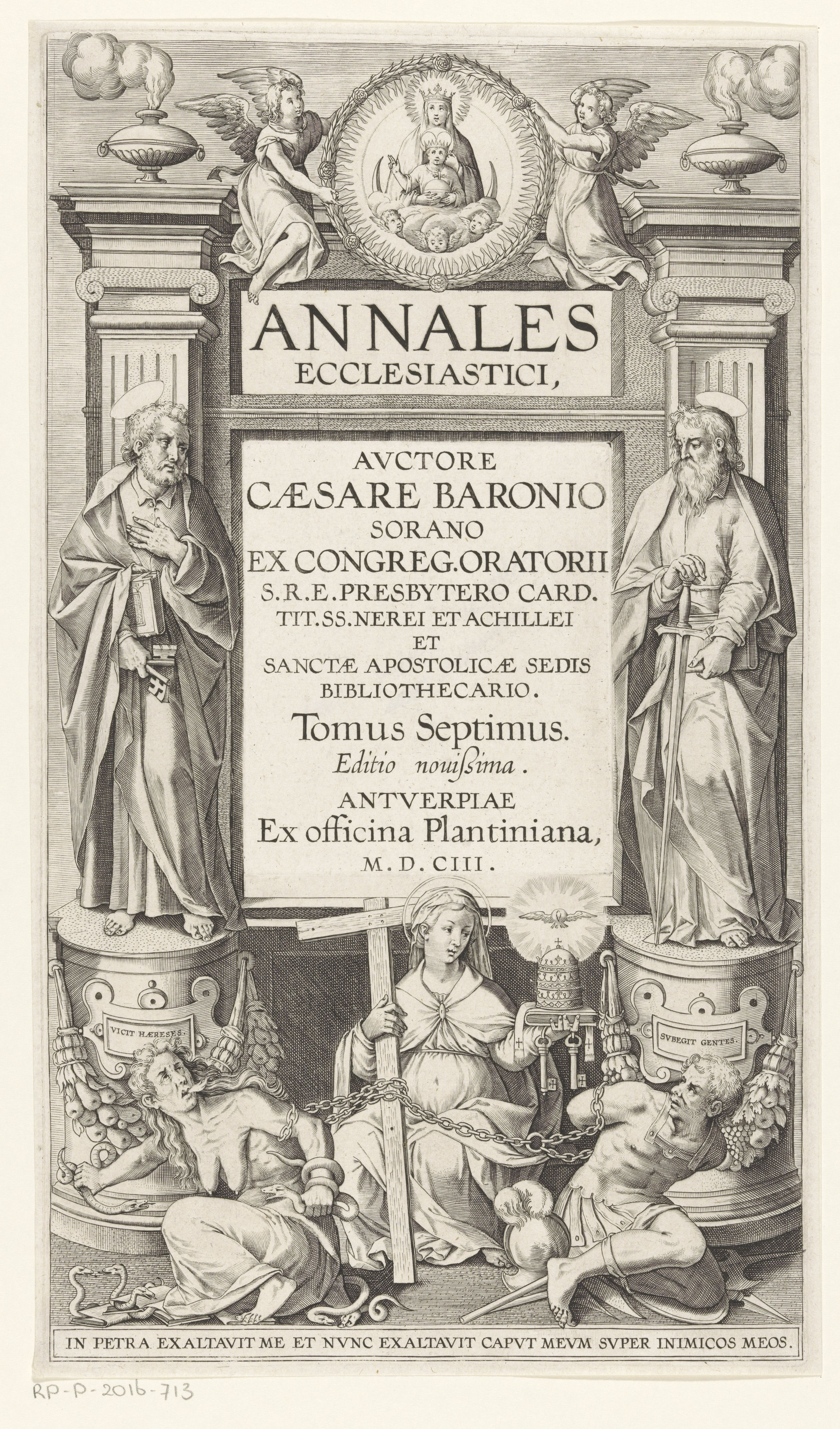
Annales Ecclesiastici, title page for vol. VII (1603) in the Antwerp edition.

The details of the first edition are as follows:

Volume	Published	Dates
I	1588	To 100 AD
II	1590	100 to 306
III	1592	To 361
IV	1593	361 to 395
V	1594	395 to 440
VI	1595	440 to 518
VII	1596	518 to 590
VIII	1599	590 to 714
IX	1600	714 to 842
X	1602	843 to 1000
XI	1605	1000 to 1099
XII	1607	1100 to 1193

The difficulties which beset Baronius in the publication of the Annales Ecclesiastici were many and annoying. He prepared his manuscript unaided, writing every page with his own hand. His brother Oratorians at Rome could lend him no assistance. Those at Naples, who helped him in revising his copy, were scarcely competent and almost exasperating in their dilatoriness and uncritical judgment. The proofs he read himself. His printers, in the infancy of their art, were neither prompt nor painstaking. In the Spring of 1588 the first volume appeared and was universally acclaimed for its surprising wealth of information, its splendid erudition, and its timely vindication of papal claims. The Magdeburg Centuries were eclipsed. Those highest in ecclesiastical and civil authority complimented the author, but more gratifying still was the truly phenomenal sale the book secured and the immediate demand for its translation into the principal European languages. It was Baronius' intention to produce a volume every year; but the second was not ready until early in 1590. The next four appeared yearly, the seventh late in 1596, the other five at still-longer intervals, up to 1607, when, just before his death, he completed the twelfth volume, which he had foreseen in a vision would be the term of his work. It brought the history down to 1198, the year of the accession of Innocent III.

The first volume dealt with Gentile prophets, among whom were Hermes Trismegistus, the supposed author of the Corpus Hermeticum, and the Sibylline Oracles of Rome. Some, it was claimed, had foreseen Christ's birth. This was disputed by post-Protestant Reformation scholars, including Isaac Casaubon in his De rebus sacris et ecclesiasticis exercitationes, XVI.

The compilation of a monumental account of Church history, the Annales Ecclesiastici, could not fail to have its controversial aspects, even within the bounds of the Roman obedience; for example, discussions of the papal relations with the Normans in the eleventh century led to the Spanish resenting consideration of their rights in the Kingdom of Naples. Baronius incurred Philip's further displeasure by supporting the cause of his enemy, the excommunicate Henry IV of France, whose absolution Baronius warmly advocated. For these reasons the Annales Ecclesiastici were condemned by the Spanish Inquisition.

Baronius surpassed the Centuriators in the extent of his quotation from and of original documents, to which he had privileged access as librarian; the early volumes of the work contain many pieces of epigraphic evidence - coins and medals are discussed and illustrated. Baronius was gifted with a critical spirit which was, to say the least, much keener than that of his contemporaries. Like most serious scholars by this date, he rejected the Donation of Constantine and many other traditional bits of papal apparatus. References to authorities are even more plentiful than in the Centuries and, useful device (though not his own invention), the exact location of the text quoted was removed to a marginal note instead of encumbering the text. Like the Centuries, the work was well indexed.

Baronius' Annales Ecclesiastici included many documents from the Vatican Archives which are still unavailable elsewhere.

== Influence ==
Annales Ecclesiastici were immediately and immensely successful among both Protestants and Catholics. There were many reprints and compendia, the latter being widely translated. The first two volumes (1588, 1590) were printed on the presses of the Vatican; later editions had the honour of being issued by Plantin (1589-1609) and Moretus (1596-1610). Above all it was continued. Bzovius carried the story down from 1198, where Baronio had ended (vol. XII, 1607), to the year 1572. Later others took up the task, notably Raynaldi (1646-77) and in the nineteenth century Theiner; meanwhile many other scholars had revised and enriched the work, notably Giovanni Domenico Mansi (1692-1769).

== Continuations ==
Antoine Pagi and his nephew François Pagi made corrections to the Annales in the late 17th century. Continuators of Baronius of the Early Modern period were Odorico Raynaldi, Giacomo Laderchi, Henri Spondanus, and Abraham Bzovius. In the 19th century the Annales were continued by August Theiner.
