= Bzovius =

Polish Dominican historian

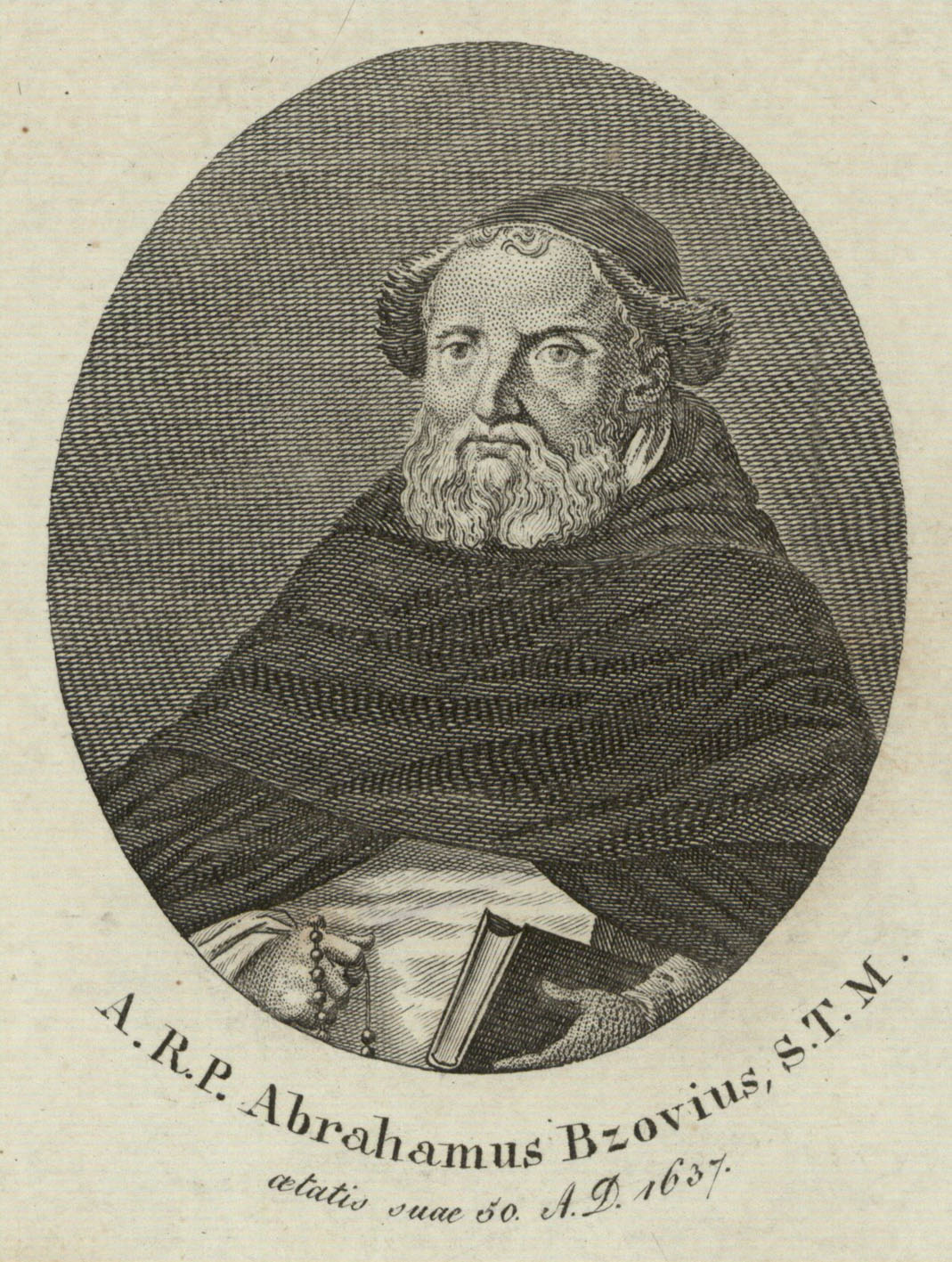
- Born: 1567; Proszowice
- Died: 31 January 1637 (aged 69–70); Rome
- Occupation: Church historian

Abraham Bzowski (Bzovius) (1567–1637) was a Polish Dominican historian. He carried on the work of Baronius. The Catholic Encyclopedia calls his contributions for 1198 to 1571 "less notable" than some of other continuators, namely Raynaldus, Laderchi, and August Theiner.

In 1630 Bzovius funded a scholarship for Polish students at the College of St. Thomas, which was to become the Pontifical University of Saint Thomas Aquinas, Angelicum.

== Works ==
- Thaumaturgus Polonus seu de vita et miraculis S. Hyacinthi (Venice, 1606);
- Vita Beati Ceslai Odrovantii (Cracow, 1608), life of Ceslas Odrowaz;
- Annales Ecclesiastici (Cologne, 1625-1630; 7 volumes); full title: Annalium Ecclesiasticorum post illustriss. et Reverendiss. Dom. Caesarem Baronium S. R. E. Cardinalem Bibliothecarium etc.;
- De vita Pauli V (Rome, 1625).
