= Jean Cohen de Vinkenhoef =

French writer, translator, and librarian

- Born: Anne-Jean-Philippe-Louis Cohen de Vinkenhoef; 17 October 1781; Amersfoort, Dutch Republic
- Died: 6 April 1848 (aged 66); Paris, French Second Republic

Anne-Jean-Philippe-Louis Cohen de Vinkenhoef (17 October 1781 – 6 April 1848) was a French writer, translator, and librarian.

Cohen was born to Jewish parents at Amersfoort, in the Netherlands. Beginning as a journalist, he contributed to the Étoile. He went to Paris in 1809, and was appointed censor for foreign languages in 1811, and librarian of the Bibliothèque Ste-Geneviève in 1824. He was the compiler of several catalogues, and also contributed to various papers, including L'Ami du roi and Les Annales de la littérature et des arts, and translated works by French, Swedish, English, Russian, and Italian authors, as La symbolique populaire, by Jacob Buchmann; Histoire des institutions d'éducation ecclésiastique, by Augustin Theiner; Scènes Norvégiennes, by Frédérique Bremer; and Histoire de la conquête de Grenade, by Washington Irving, 1829. He also contributed the "Théâtre Hollandais" section to the Collection des théâtres étrangers.

In addition Cohen published a number of works, among which were: La France telle que M. Kératry la rêve, Paris, 1821; Herminie de Civray; ou, L'ermite de la foret, 1823; Histoire de Pierre Terrail, dit le Chevalier Bayard, 1821 and 1825; Jacqueline de Bavière, Dauphine de France, 1821; Précis Historique sur Pie VII, 1823; La noblesse de France, histoire, mœurs, et institutions, 1845; and Réflexions historiques et philosophiques sur les révolutions, 1846.
