= Donation of Constantine =

Forged Roman imperial decree

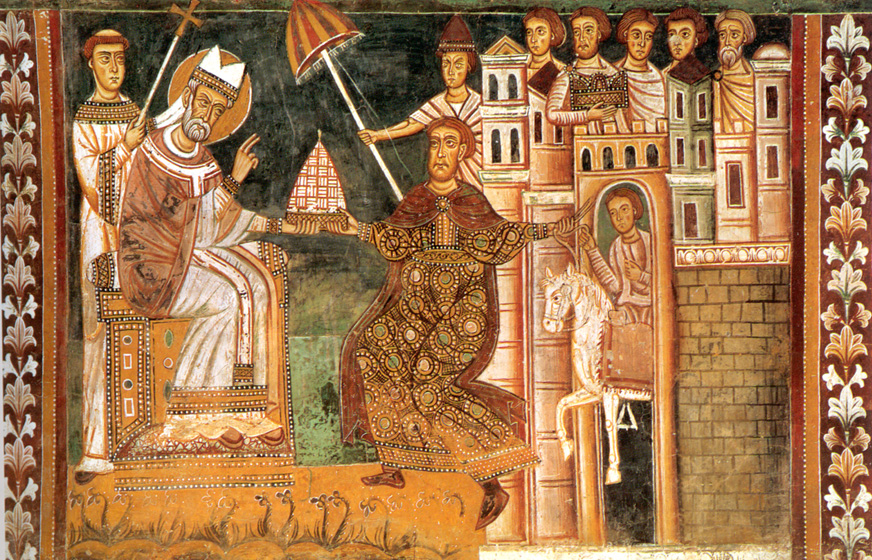
A 13th-century fresco of Sylvester I and Constantine the Great, showing the purported Donation (Santi Quattro Coronati, Rome)

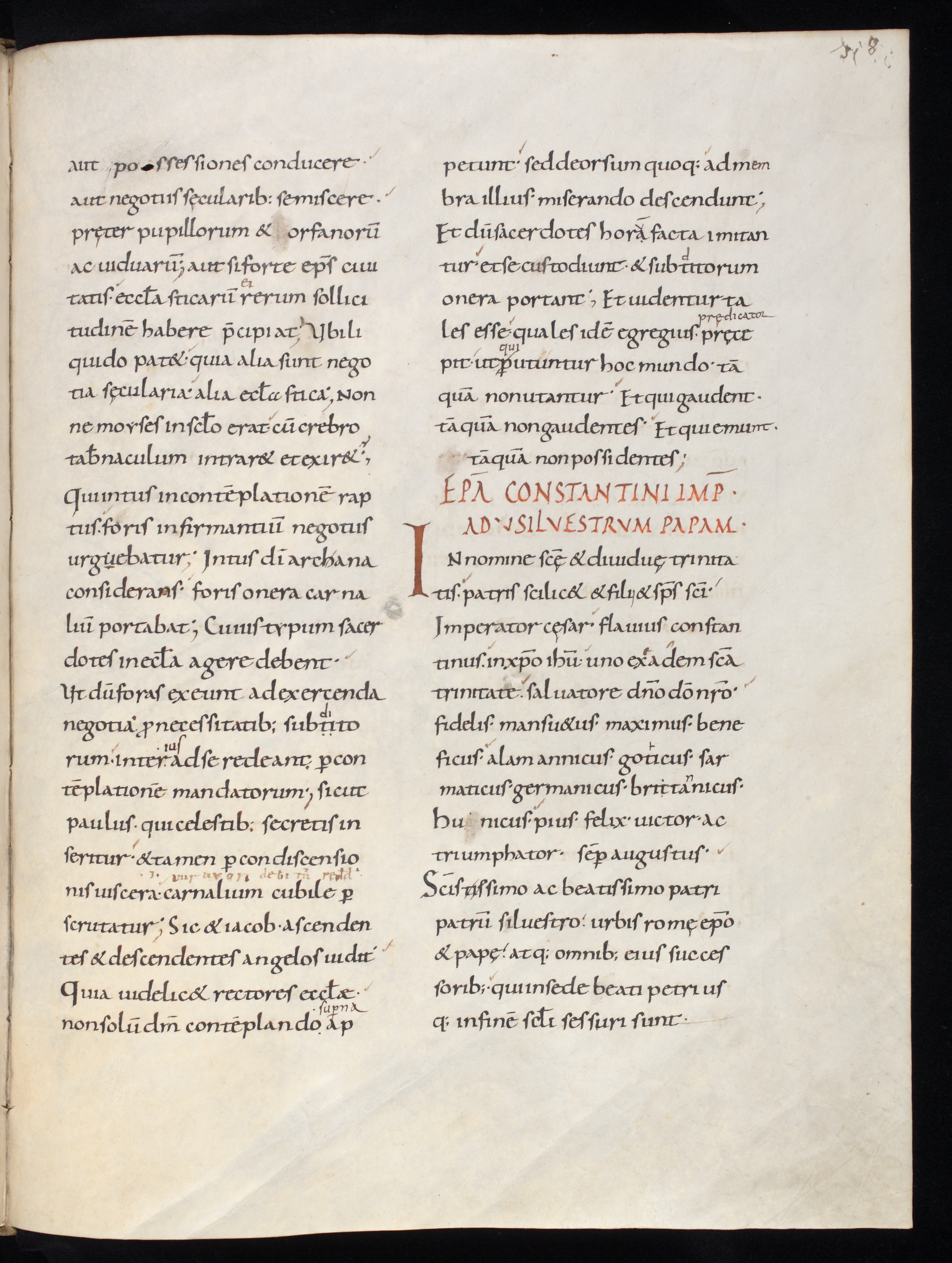
A 9th-century copy of the Donation of Constantine as part of the False Decretals by Pseudo-Isidore. The heading in red reads Epistola Constantini Imperatoris ad Silvestrum Papam or "Letter of Emperor Constantine to Pope Sylvester".

The Donation of Constantine (Latin: Donatio Constantini) is a forged Roman imperial decree by which the 4th-century emperor Constantine the Great supposedly transferred authority over Rome and the western part of the Roman Empire to the Pope. Composed probably in the 8th century, it was used, especially in the 13th century, in support of claims of political authority by the papacy.

In many of the existing manuscripts, including the oldest, the document bears the title Constitutum domini Constantini imperatoris. The Donation of Constantine was included in the 9th-century Pseudo-Isidorean decretals. Lorenzo Valla, an Italian Catholic priest and Renaissance humanist, is credited with first exposing the forgery with solid philological arguments in 1439–1440, although the document's authenticity had been repeatedly contested since 1001.

== Content ==
An alleged decree from Roman Emperor Constantine I, dated March 30 and not explicitly stating its year, incorrectly references the co-consul of Constantine I in his fourth term (315) as Gallicanus (317). Historical records confirm that these two never served as consuls together, indicating this as evidence of the document's forged nature. The forged imperial decree states that "Constantine" professes Christianity (confessio) and entitles to Pope Sylvester I several imperial insignia and privileges (donatio), as well as the Lateran Palace. Rome, the rest of Italy, and the western provinces of the empire are made over to the papacy.

The text recounts a narrative founded on the 5th-century Acts of Sylvester. This tale describes the sainted Pope Sylvester's rescue of the Romans from the depredations of a local dragon and the pontiff's miraculous cure of the emperor's leprosy by the sacrament of baptism. The story was rehearsed by the Liber Pontificalis; by the later 8th century the dragon-slayer Sylvester and his apostolic successors were rewarded in the Donation of Constantine with temporal powers never in fact exercised by the historical Bishops of Rome under Constantine.

In his gratitude, "Constantine" determined to bestow on the seat of Peter "power, and dignity of glory, vigor, and imperial honor," and "supremacy as well over the four principal sees: Alexandria, Antioch, Jerusalem, and Constantinople, as also over all the churches of God in the whole earth". For the upkeep of the church of Saint Peter and that of Saint Paul, he gave landed estates "in Judea, Greece, Asia, Thrace, Africa, Italy and the various islands". To Sylvester and his successors he also granted imperial insignia, the tiara, and "the city of Rome, and all the provinces, places and cities of Italy and the western regions".

The Donation sought reduction in the authority of Constantinople; if Constantine I had elevated Pope Sylvester I to imperial rank before the inauguration of Constantinople in 330, then Sylvester, Rome's Patriarch would have had a lead of fifteen years in the contest for primacy among the patriarchates. Implicitly, the papacy asserted its supremacy and prerogative to transfer the imperial seat; the papacy had consented to the translatio imperii to Byzantium by Constantine and it could wrest back the authority at will.

== Origin ==
It has been suggested that an early draft of the Donation of Constantine was made shortly after the middle of the 8th century, in order to assist Pope Stephen II in his negotiations with Pepin the Short, who then held the position of Mayor of the Palace (i.e., the manager of the household of the Frankish king). In 754, Pope Stephen II crossed the Alps to anoint Pepin king, thereby enabling the Carolingian family to supplant the old Merovingian royal line. In return for Stephen's support, Pepin gave the pope the lands in Italy which the Lombards had taken from the Byzantine (Eastern Roman) Empire. It is also possible it originated in the chancery of Stephen's immediate successor Paul I. These lands would become the Papal States and would be the basis of the papacy's temporal power for the next eleven centuries.

Another interpretation holds that the Donation was not an official forgery directed at Constantinople, but was instead a ploy in Roman ecclesiastical politics to bolster the status of the Lateran, which does have historical Constantinian connections, against the rising status of the Vatican, and it may have been composed by a Greek monk working in a Roman monastery. In one study, an attempt was made at dating the forgery to the 9th century, and placing its composition at Corbie Abbey, in northern France.

German medievalist Johannes Fried draws a distinction between the Donation of Constantine and an earlier, also forged version, the Constitutum Constantini, which was included in the collection of forged documents, the False Decretals, compiled in the latter half of the 9th century. Fried argues the Donation is a later expansion of the much shorter Constitutum. Christopher B. Coleman understands the mention in the Constitutum of a donation of "the western regions" to refer to the regions of Lombardy, Veneto, and Istria.

== Medieval use and reception ==
What may perhaps be the earliest known allusion to the Donation is in a letter of 778, in which Pope Hadrian I exhorts Charlemagne – whose father, Pepin the Short, had made the Donation of Pepin granting the Popes sovereignty over the Papal States – to follow Constantine's example and endow the Roman Catholic church. Otto III's chancery denied its authenticity.

The first pope to directly invoke the decree was Pope Leo IX, in a letter sent in 1054 to Michael I Cerularius, Patriarch of Constantinople. He cited a large portion of the document, believing it genuine, furthering the debate that would ultimately lead to the East–West Schism. In the 11th and 12th centuries, the Donation was often cited in the investiture conflicts between the papacy and the secular powers in the West.

The document's contents contradicted the Byzantines' notion that Constantine's translatio imperii transferred the seat of imperial authority from Rome to his foundation of Constantinople, named the "New Rome". Consequently, the Donation featured in the east–west dispute over ecclesiastical primacy between the patriarchal sees of Rome and New Rome. Cardinal Humbert of Silva Candida also issued a version of the document to support the papacy's claims against the eastern emperors' and patriarchs' primacy.

By the 12th century the text existed in Greek translation, of which a 14th-century manuscript survives, and Byzantine writers were also using the Donation in their polemics; John Kinnamos, writing in the reign of eastern emperor Manuel I Komnenos, criticized western Staufer emperors as usurpers and denied the popes had the right to bestow the imperial office. Theodore Balsamon justified Michael Cerularius's behaviour in 1054 using the Donation as a rationale for his dismissal of the papal legation and the mutual excommunications that followed.

In 1248, the Chapel of St Sylvester in the Basilica of the Santi Quattro Coronati was decorated with fresco showing the story of the Roman baptism and Donation of Constantine.

In his Divine Comedy, written in the early 14th century, the poet Dante Alighieri wrote:

Ahi, Costantin, di quanto mal fu matre,
non la tua conversion, ma quella dote
che da te prese il primo ricco patre!

Translation:

Ah, Constantine, how much evil was born,
not from your conversion, but from that donation
that the first wealthy Pope received from you!

== Investigation ==
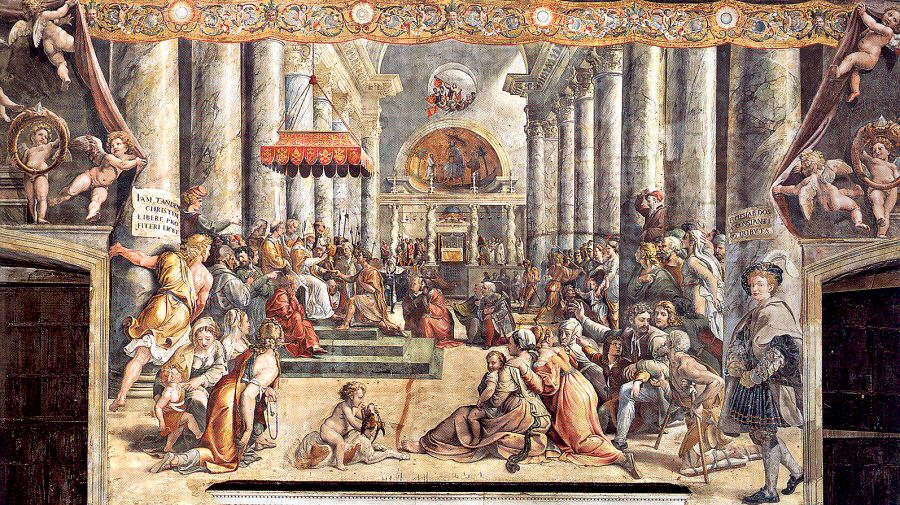
Workshop of Raphael, The Donation of Constantine. Stanze di Raffaello, Vatican City

During the Middle Ages, the Donation was widely accepted as authentic, although Holy Roman Emperor Otto III did possibly raise suspicions as to the document's authenticity due to its making a gift to the See of Rome. It was not until the mid-15th century, with the revival of Classical scholarship and textual criticism, that humanists, and eventually the papal bureaucracy, began to realize that the document could not possibly be genuine. Cardinal Nicholas of Cusa declared it to be a forgery and spoke of it as an apocryphal work.

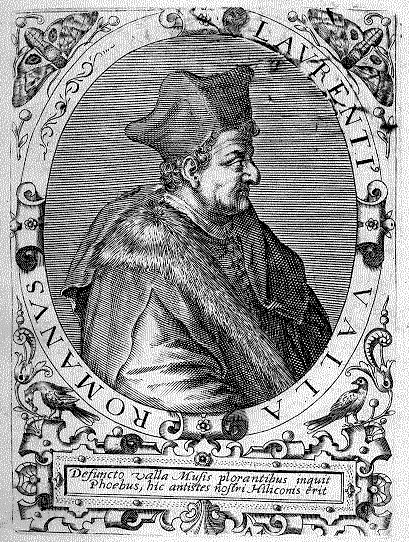
Lorenzo Valla

Later, the humanist and scholar Lorenzo Valla argued in his philological study of the text that the language used in manuscript could not be dated to the 4th century. The language of the text suggests that the manuscript can most likely be dated to the 8th century. Valla believed the forgery to be so obvious that he suspected that the Church knew the document to be inauthentic. Valla further argued that papal usurpation of temporal power had corrupted the church, caused the wars of Italy, and reinforced the "overbearing, barbarous, tyrannical priestly domination."

Independently of both Cusa and Valla, Reginald Pecocke, Bishop of Chichester (1450–1457), reached a similar conclusion. Among the indications that the Donation is a forgery are its language and the fact that, while certain imperial-era formulas are used in the text, some of the Latin in the document could not have been written in the 4th century; anachronistic terms such as "fief" were used. Also, the purported date of the document is inconsistent with the content of the document itself, as it refers both to the fourth consulate of Constantine (315) as well as the consulate of Gallicanus (317).

Pope Pius II wrote a tract in 1453, five years before becoming pope, to show that though the Donation was a forgery, the papacy owed its lands to Charlemagne and its powers of the keys to Peter; however, he did not publish it.

Contemporary opponents of papal powers in Italy emphasized the primacy of civil law and civil jurisdiction, now firmly embodied once again in the Justinian Corpus Juris Civilis. The Florentine chronicler Giovanni Cavalcanti reported that, in the very year of Valla's treatise, Filippo Maria Visconti, Duke of Milan, made diplomatic overtures toward Cosimo de' Medici in Florence, proposing an alliance against the pope. In reference to the Donation, Visconti wrote: "It so happens that even if Constantine consigned to Sylvester so many and such rich gifts – which is doubtful, because such a privilege can nowhere be found – he could only have granted them for his lifetime: the empire takes precedence over any lordship."

Later, scholars further demonstrated that other elements, such as Sylvester's curing of Constantine, are legends which originated at a later time. Wolfram Setz, a recent editor of Valla's work, has affirmed that at the time of Valla's refutation, Constantine's alleged "donation" was no longer a matter of contemporary relevance in political theory and that it simply provided an opportunity for an exercise in legal rhetoric.

The bulls of Nicholas V and his successors made no further mention of the Donation, even when partitioning the New World, though the doctrine of "omni-insular" papal fiefdoms, developed out of the Donation's vague references to islands since Pope Nicholas II's grant of Sicily to Robert Guiscard, was deployed after 1492 in papal pronouncements on the overlapping claims of the Iberian kingdoms in the Americas and Moluccas, including Inter caetera, a bull that resulted in the Treaty of Tordesillas and the Treaty of Zaragoza. Valla's treatise was taken up vehemently by writers of the Protestant Reformation, such as Ulrich von Hutten and Martin Luther, causing the treatise to be placed on the Index Librorum Prohibitorum in the mid-16th century.

The Donation continued to be tacitly accepted as authentic until Caesar Baronius in his Annales Ecclesiastici (published 1588–1607) admitted that it was a forgery, after which it was almost universally accepted as such. Some continued to argue for its authenticity; nearly a century after Annales Ecclesiastici, Christian Wolff still alluded to the Donation as undisputed fact.

== See also ==
- Constantinianism
- Caesaropapism
- Donation of Sutri
- Donation of Pepin
- Investiture Controversy
- Privilegium maius
- Translatio imperii
- Vatican City
- List of late imperial Roman consuls
- Legacy of the Roman Empire
- Inter caetera
- Treaty of Tordesillas and Treaty of Zaragoza

== Sources ==
- Lea, Henry Charles (1895). "The 'Donation of Constantine'". The English Historical Review. X (37): 86–87. doi:10.1093/ehr/X.XXXVII.86.
- Wilson, Eric (2008). Savage Republic: De Indis of Hugo Grotius, Republicanism and Dutch Hegemony within the Early Modern World-System (C. 1600-1619). doi:10.1163/ej.9789004167889.i-534. ISBN 978-90-04-16788-9.
