= Camposagrado Palace (Avilés) =

Palace in Avilés, Asturias, Spain

Coordinates: 43.5574°N 5.9221°W

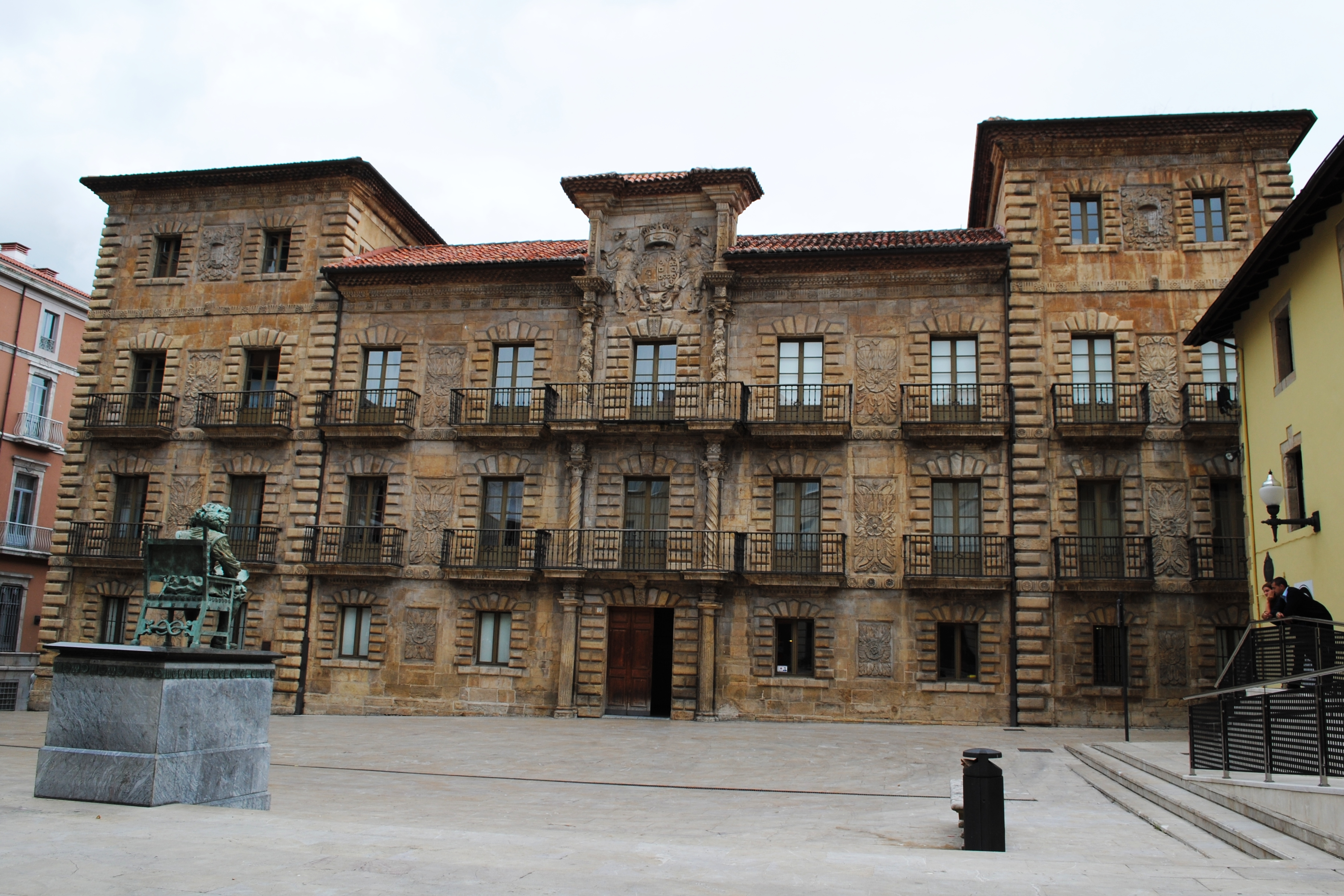
Palacio de Camposagrado

Camposagrado Palace is a baroque-style palace located in Avilés in Asturias, Spain. It was constructed on the site of a medieval building and used by the family of the Marquises of Camposagrado until the nineteenth century when it became a military barracks. In the twentieth century, the property was partially used for commercial purposes, but after acquisition and restoration by the City Council of Avilés, it became the School of Art for the Principality of Asturias.

== History ==
Camposagrado was probably designed by architect Francisco Menéndez Camina of Avilés, between 1693 and 1696. It began from the medieval remains of a previous palace on the site, owned by the powerful family Las Alas, which was the lineage of the wife of the Marquises of Camposagrado. In 1661 Gutierre Bernaldo de Quirós was given the title Marquises of Camposagrado and it was his wife, Eulalia de las Alas Carreño who would pass the property on to her heirs.

The expansion began both to the south and to the north. The northern expansion, toward the sea was defensive and ended at the ancient city walls. The northern façade, toward Pier Park, features a loggia or veranda reminiscent of those which were popular in the Renaissance, allowing a viewer to watch the port.

The southern expansion was ornamental and opened into a plaza which both looked at the town and allowed the town to view the villa on display. The façade faces the Plaza de Camposagrado and features two square towers flanking a central building which was common at the time with the aristocracy of Asturias. Multiple balconies and window lintels as well as overlapping pairs of columns in various styles including Tuscan, Corinthian, and Solomonic add to the ornate style. The central focus of the southern façade is the family coat of arms on the middle balcony on the upper floor.

During the eighteenth century, several repairs and modifications were completed. In 1723, Mauritius Haedo was hired for some minor repairs. In 1774, the local stonework master Pedro Solis, was engaged to repair the gallery, some broken slabs and paving stones, as well as some pipes. Solis' contract also specified that Francisco Pruneda Cañal was in charge of building the Marquis' mill house.

The nineteenth century marked consecutive eras of decline for the Palace. During the Peninsular War it is used as the headquarters of Napoleon's troops and still later to house Asturian troops. The walls of the villa were destroyed during 1818-1821 and the building was opened on the sides of the gallery arches to facilitate communication with the parapet. In the twentieth century, Eladio Fernández Carreño, owner of the house in 1942, requested authorization from the municipality to complete interior renovations, creating stores for mercantile trade. Because the building was historically significant, Fernández Carreño asked for approval of modifications in 1943 and again 1949. He was dissuaded from some of his plans, but the lower level of the building housed stores in the twentieth century.

On 27 May 1955, the property was declared a Cultural monument. Avilés City Council began taking steps to acquire the property in 1999 and started a restoration project in 2002. The exterior stonework though damaged, was primarily preserved, but the interior was completely destroyed. The only remaining feature of the interior was the grand staircase, though there were partial remains of some of the wooden ceilings. Complete restoration of both the interior and exterior was performed.

Today it houses the School of Art, under the Ministry of Education and Science of the Principality of Asturias.
