= François Pagi =

French Franciscan historian of the Catholic Church

François Pagi (7 September 1654 – 21 January 1721) was a French Franciscan historian of the Catholic Church.

== Life ==
Pagi was born at Lambesc in Provence. After studying with the Oratorians at Toulon, he became a Conventual Franciscan, and was three times provincial. He died at Orange, France.

== Works ==
He assisted his uncle Antoine Pagi in the correction of the Annales Ecclesiastici of Baronius; and edited the Critica of his uncle. He wrote his own history of the popes up to the year 1447: Breviarium historico-chronologico-criticum illustriora Pontificum romanorum gesta, conciliorum generalium acta ... complectens (4 vols., Antwerp, 1717–27). The history was continued in two volumes by his nephew, Antoine Pagi the Younger (Antwerp, 1748–53).
