= Giacomo Laderchi =

Italian ecclesiastical historian

Giacomo Laderchi (c. 1678 – 25 April 1738) was an Italian Oratorian and ecclesiastical historian.

== Biography and works ==
He was born at Faenza near Ravenna, and died in Rome.

He is chiefly known for his continuation of the "Annals" of Cardinal Caesar Baronius and Odorico Raynaldi, which he brought down from the year 1566 to 1571. His contribution, though of some usefulness, is not sufficiently critical and is encumbered with numerous unimportant documents. It appeared in Rome (1728–1737), and extends from volume XXXV to volume XXXVII in the latest edition of Baronius (Bar-le-Duc, 1864–83).

Laderchi was also the author of several other historical -hagiographical- works, two of which involved him in heated literary controversies. His voluminous "Life of St. Peter Damian" (Vita Sancti Petri Damiani, Rome, 1702) was mercilessly but excessively criticized in an anonymous work entitled: "Sejani et Rufini dialogus de Laderchiana historia S. Petri Damiani" (Paris, 1705).

When he published his edition of the "Acts of the martyrdom of St. Crescus and companions" (Acta passionis SS. Cresci et sociorum martyrum, Florence, 1707), the Servite G. Caspassi attacked their authenticity and trustworthiness in a letter to the Roman scholar Fontanini. The letter fell into the hands of Laderchi, who published it with a refutation. This elicited a vehement answer from Capassi under the title "Nugæ Laderchianæ" (Genoa, 1709). The ecclesiastical authorities seem to have put an end to the controversy; both works were placed on the Index Librorum Prohibitorum on 22 June 1712. These controversies probably occasioned the composition of "La Critica d'oggidi" by Laderchi (Rome, 1726).

He was also the author of the following works:

- "Discorso all'Illustrissimo magistrato della città di Faenza nel presentare al medesimo un'antica lapide da lui ritrovata nel sacro cimiterio de' SS. MM. Pietro e Marcellino nella via Lavicana" (Faenza, 1700).
- "De Basilicis Sanctorum Martyrum Petri et Marcellini dissertatio historica" (Rome, 1705)
- "Acta Sanctae Cæciliæ et transtiberina basilica illustrata" (Rome, 1722)
- "Acta Sanctorum Christi martyrum vindicata" (Rome, 1723)
- "Sanctorum patriarcharum et prophetarum, confessorum ... cultus perpetuus in Ecclesia catholica assertus et illustratus" (Rome, 1730).
