= Antoine Pagi =

French ecclesiastical historian

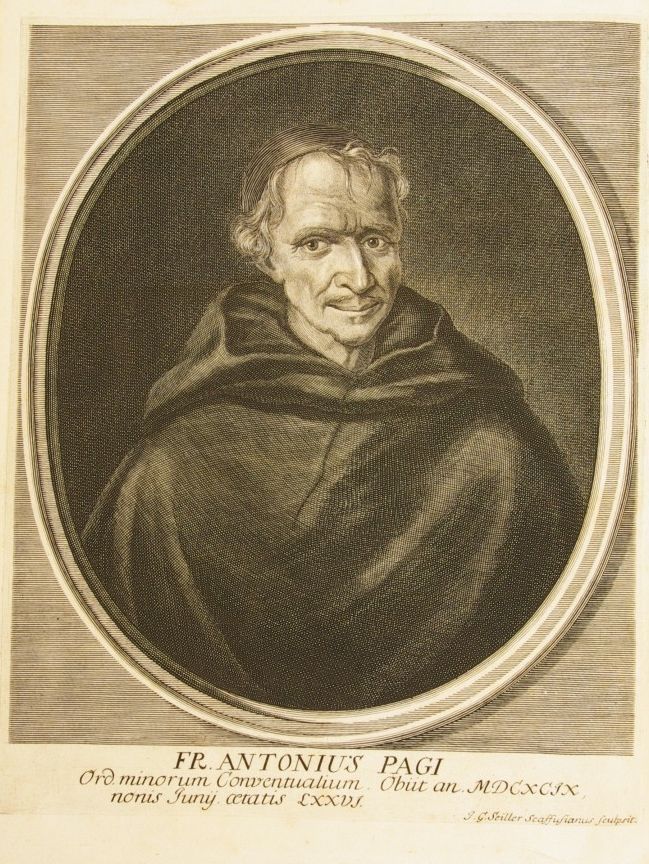
Portrait of Antonius Pagi, used in his Critica historico-chronologica in universos Annales ecclesiasticos [...] Cæsaris cardinalis Baronii (1705), found in: Universiteit Antwerpen - Bibliotheek Stadscampus MAG-P 15.183

Antoine Pagi (31 March 1624 – 5 June 1699) was a French ecclesiastical historian.

== Biography ==
Pagi was born in Rognes. After studying with the Jesuits in Aix, he entered the monastery of the Conventual Franciscans in Arles and made solemn profession on 31 January 1641. At the age of twenty-nine years, he was elected provincial, an office which he held four times. He died, aged 75, in Aix-en-Provence.

== Works ==
Pagi devoted his spare time to the study of history. Discerning numerous chronological errors, and frequently misstatements of facts in the Annales ecclesiastici of Baronius, he made it his life-work to correct them and otherwise elucidate the work.

Pagi's first volume was printed during his lifetime (Paris, 1689); the remaining three volumes, reaching till the year 1198, the last year in the work of Baronius, were completed in manuscript shortly before his death. The whole work was edited in four volumes by his nephew François Pagi: Critica historico-chronologica in universos annales ecclesiasticos em. et rev. Caesaris Card. Baronii (Geneva, 1705; second ed., 1727). Mansi embodied it in his edition of the Annales of Baronius (Lucca, 1736–59). The Critica itself is not free of errors.

His Dissertatio hypatica seu de consulibus caesareis (Lyons, 1682), was printed also in Apparatus in Annales ecclesiasticos (Lucca, 1740), pp. 1–136. In it, Pagi set down various rules for determining the consulship of the Roman emperors. It met with criticism from Henry Noris and others; Pagi published a few minor treatises defending it.

Pagi also published Dissertatio de die et anno mortis S. Martini ep. turonensis, and edited D. Antonii Paduani O. Min. sermones hactenus inediti (Avignon, 1685).
