= Solomonic column =

Spiraling type of column

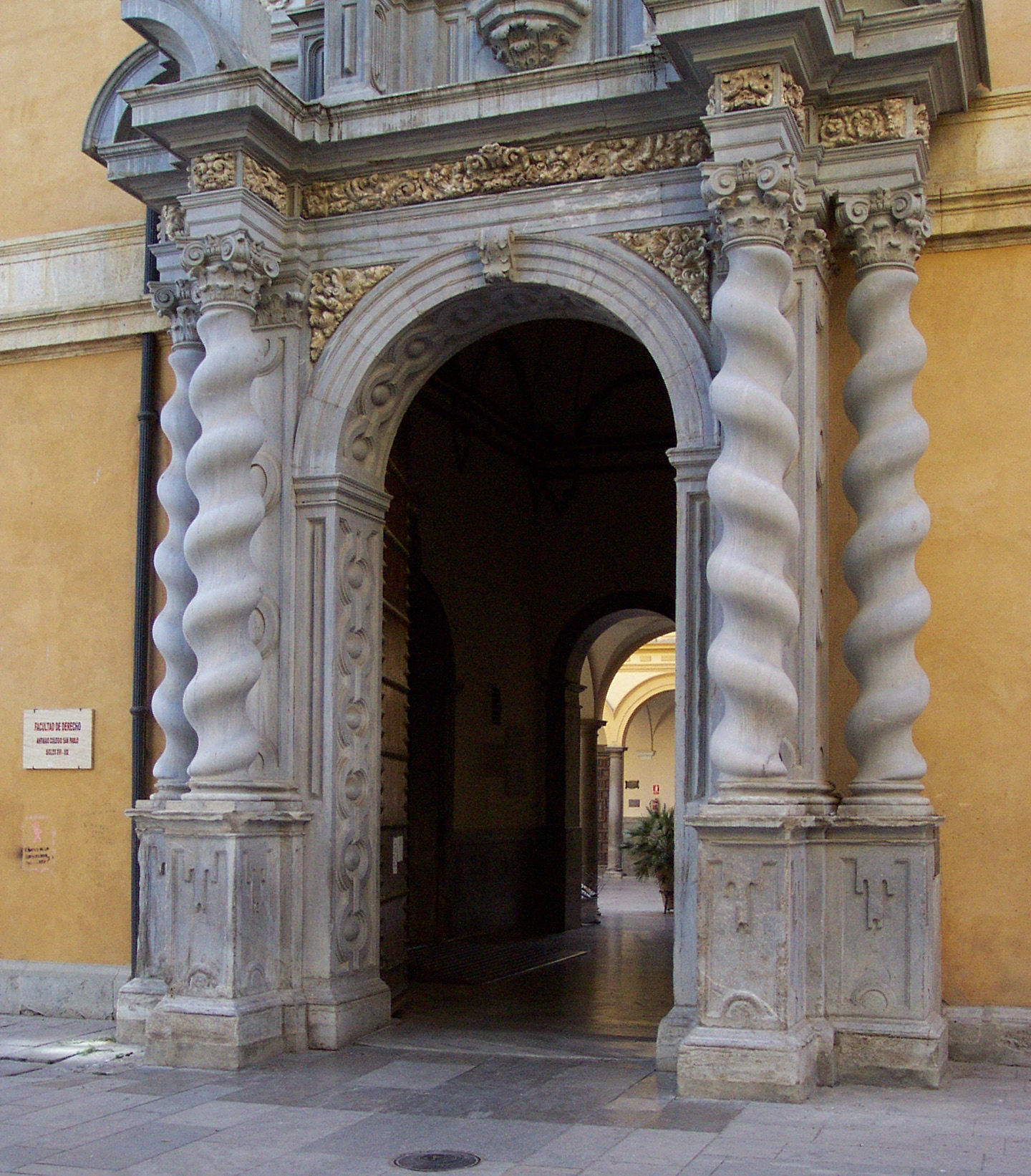
Renaissance gateway in Granada

The Solomonic column, also called barley-sugar column, is a helical column, characterized by a spiraling twisting shaft like a corkscrew. It is not associated with a specific classical order, although most examples have Corinthian or Composite capitals. But it may be crowned with any design, for example, making a Roman Doric solomonic or Ionic solomonic column.

Perhaps originating in the Near East, it is a feature of Late Roman architecture, which was revived in Baroque architecture, especially in the Spanish and Portuguese-speaking worlds. Two sets of columns, both in the very prestigious setting of St. Peter's Basilica in Rome, were probably important in the wide diffusion of the style. The first were relatively small, and given by Constantine the Great in the 4th century. These were soon believed to have come from the Temple in Jerusalem, hence the style's naming after the biblical Solomon. The second set are those of Bernini's St. Peter's Baldacchino, finished in 1633.

== Etymology and origin ==
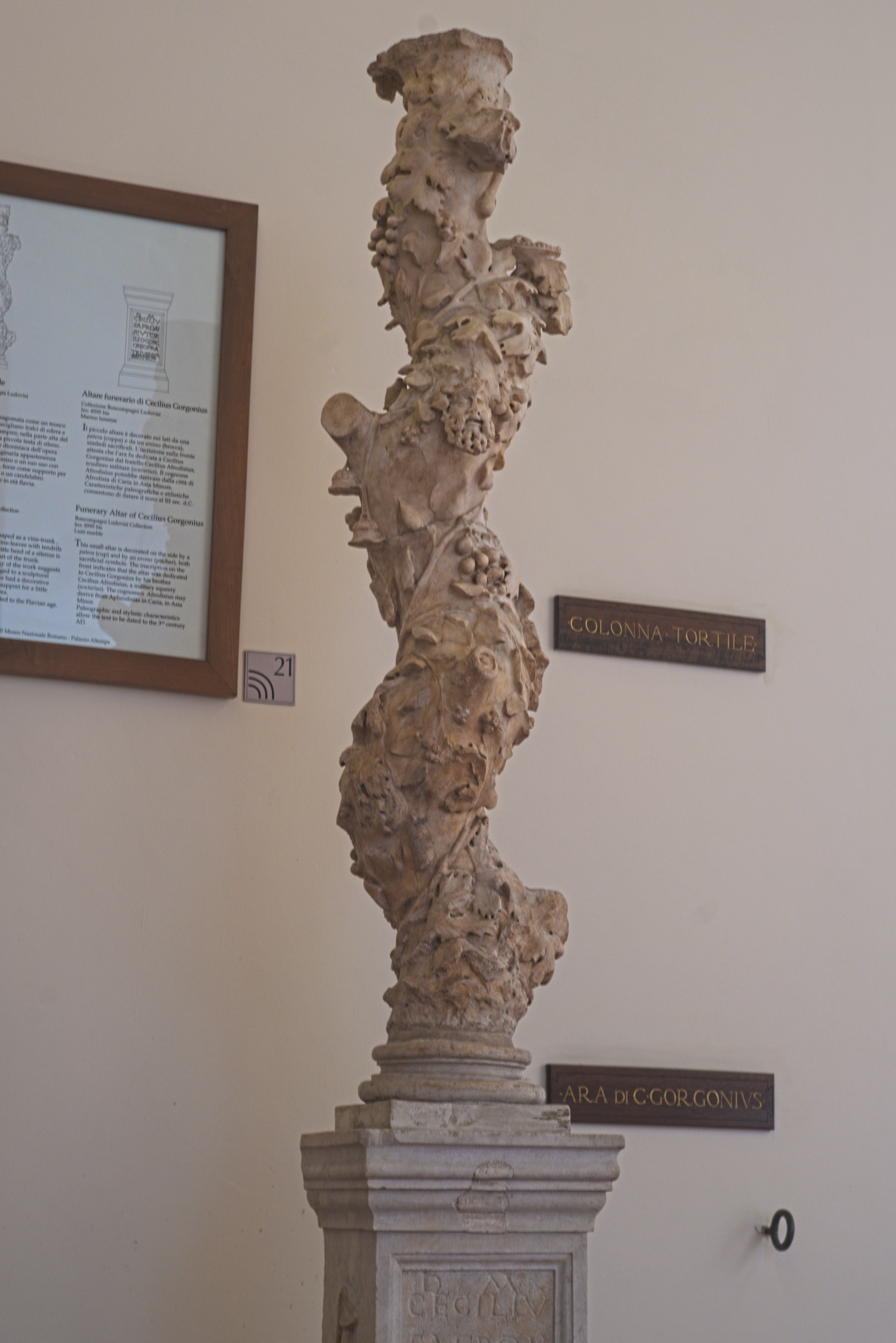
The so-called Ludovisi column, a possible forebear dated on stylistic grounds to the Flavian dynasty

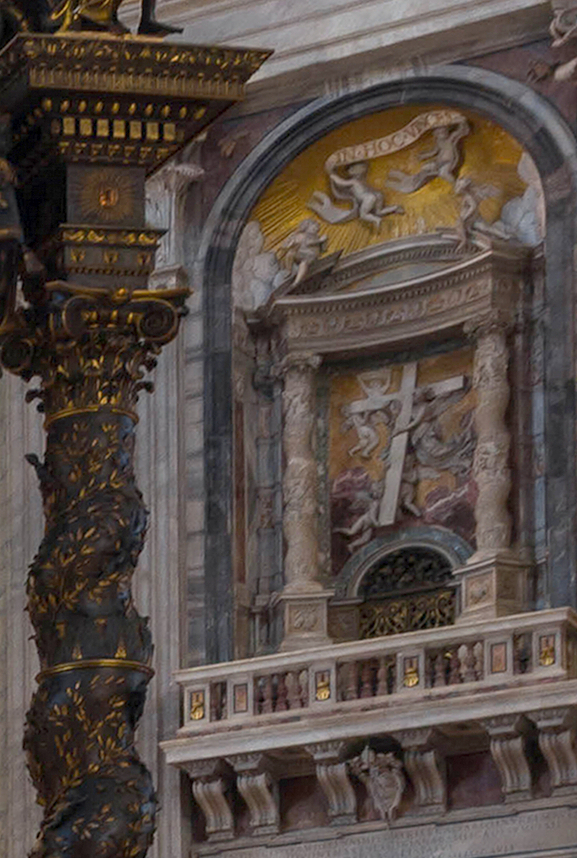
At right, two of the Solomonic columns brought to Rome by Constantine, in their present-day location on a pier in St. Peter's Basilica. In the foreground at left is part of Bernini's Baldacchino, inspired by the original columns.

Unlike the classical example of Trajan's Column of ancient Rome, which has a turned shaft decorated with a single continuous helical band of low-reliefs depicting Trajan's military might in battle, the twisted column is known to be an eastern motif taken into Byzantine architecture and decoration. Twist-fluted columns were a feature of some eastern architecture of Late Antiquity.

In the 4th century, Constantine the Great brought a set of columns to Rome and gave them to the original St. Peter's Basilica for reuse in the high altar and presbytery; The Donation of Constantine, a painting from Raphael's workshop, shows these columns in their original location. According to tradition, these columns came from the "Temple of Solomon", even though Solomon's temple was the First Temple, built in the 10th century BC and destroyed in 586 BC, not the Second Temple, destroyed in 70 AD. These columns, now considered to have been made in the 2nd century AD, became known as "Solomonic". In actuality, the columns probably came from neither temple. Constantine is recorded as having brought them de Grecias i.e., from Greece, and they are archaeologically documented as having been cut from Greek marble. A small number of Roman examples of similar columns are known. All that can firmly be said is that they are early and, because they have no Christian iconography in the carving and their early date (before the construction of elaborate churches), are presumably reused from some non-church building. The columns have distinct sections that alternate from ridged to smooth with sculpted grape leaves.

Some of these columns remained on the altar until the old structure of St. Peter's was torn down in the 16th century. While removed from the altar, eight of these columns remain part of the structure of St. Peter's. Two columns were placed below the pendentives on each of the four piers beneath the dome. Another column can now be observed up close in the St. Peter's Treasury Museum. Other columns from this set of twelve have been lost over the course of time.

If these columns really were from one of the Temples in Jerusalem, the spiral pattern may have represented the oak tree which was the first Ark of the Covenant, mentioned in Joshua 24:26. These columns have sections of twist-fluting alternating with wide bands of foliated reliefs.

From Byzantine examples, the Solomonic column passed to Western Romanesque architecture. In Romanesque architecture some columns also featured spiraling elements twisted round each other like hawser. Such variety adding life to an arcade is combined with Cosmatesque spiralling inlays in the cloister of St. John Lateran. These arcades were prominent in Rome and may have influenced the baroque Solomonic column.

== In Baroque architecture ==
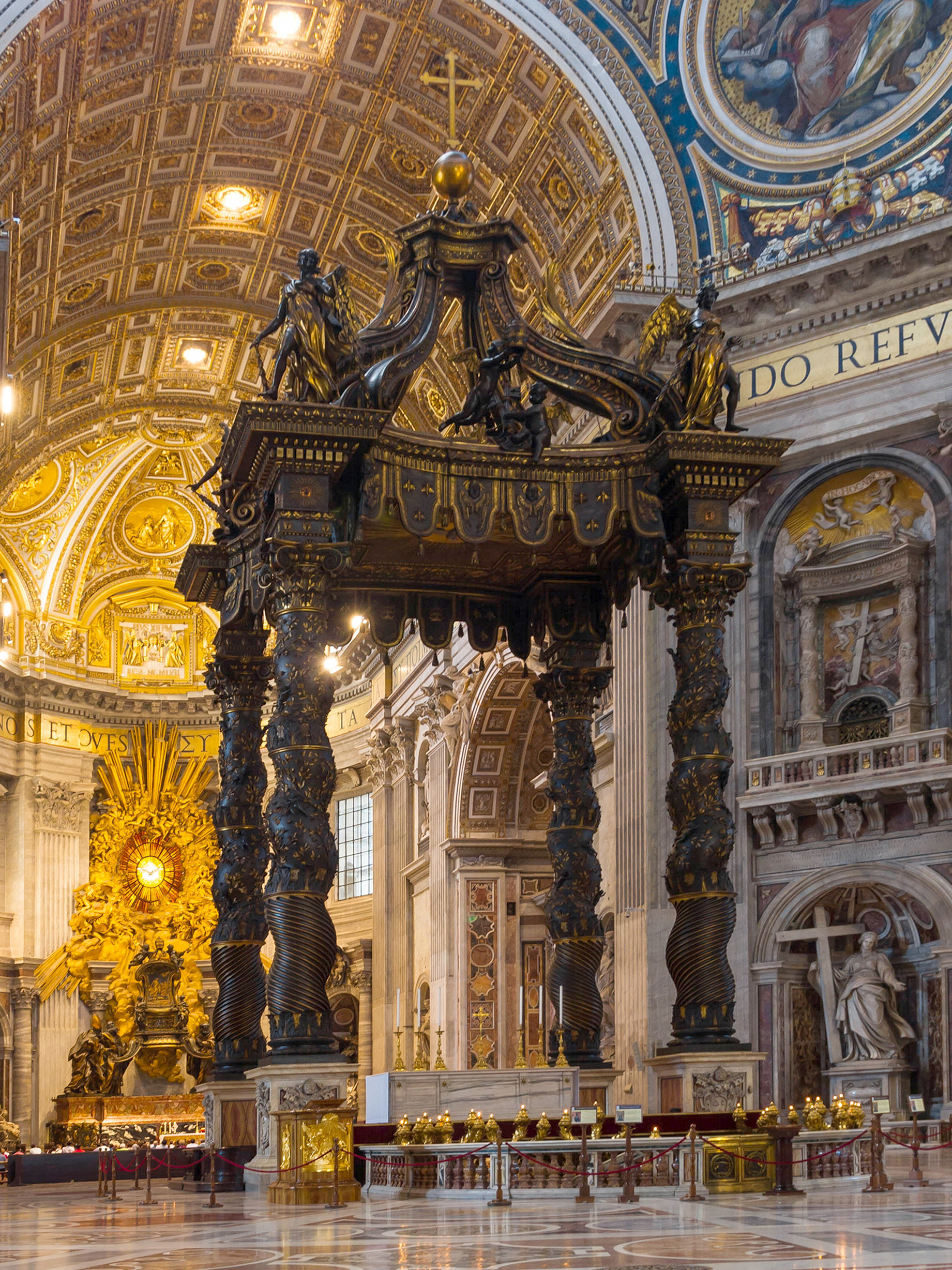
Bernini's baldacchino in St. Peter's Basilica.

The Solomonic column was revived as a feature of Baroque architecture. The twisted S-curve shaft gives energy and dynamism to the traditional column form which fits these qualities that are characteristically Baroque.

Easily the best-known Solomonic columns are the colossal bronze Composite columns by Bernini in his Baldacchino at St. Peter's Basilica. The construction of the baldachin, actually a ciborium, which was finished in 1633, required that the original ones of Constantine be moved.

During the succeeding century, Solomonic columns were commonly used in altars, furniture, and other parts of design. Sculpted vines were sometimes carved into the spiralling cavetto of the twisting columns, or made of metal, such as gilt bronze. In an ecclesiastical context such ornament may be read as symbolic of the wine used in the Eucharist.

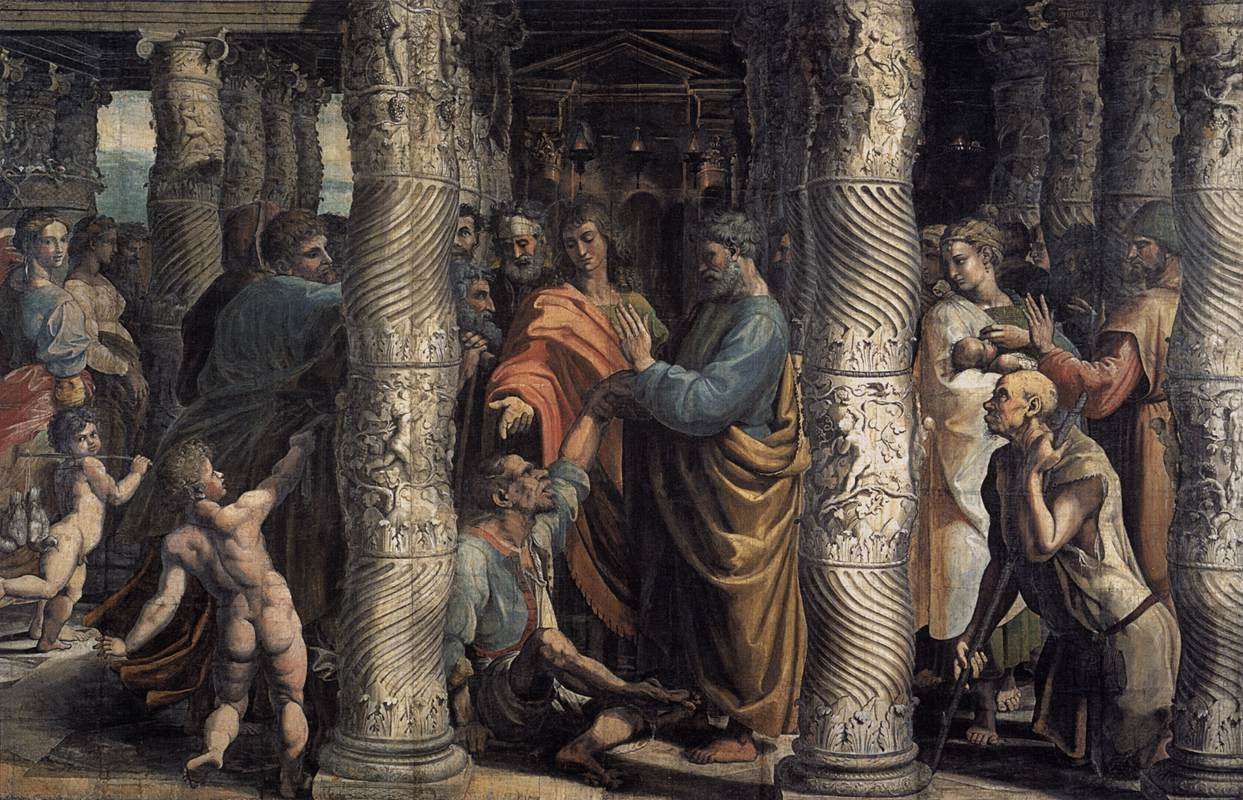
Raphael and workshop, "Healing of the Lame Man," one of the Raphael Cartoons for a tapestry of Peter healing the lame man (Acts 3). The Solomonic columns in St Peter's Basilica used as models for the columns of the Jewish Temple

In the 16th century Raphael depicted these columns in his tapestry cartoon The Healing of the Lame at the Beautiful Gate, and Anthony Blunt noticed them in Bagnocavallo's Circumcision at the Louvre and in some Roman altars, such as one in Santo Spirito in Sassia, but their full-scale use in actual architecture was rare: Giulio Romano employed a version as half-columns decoratively superimposed against a wall in the Cortile della Cavallerizza of the Palazzo Ducale, Mantua (1538-39).

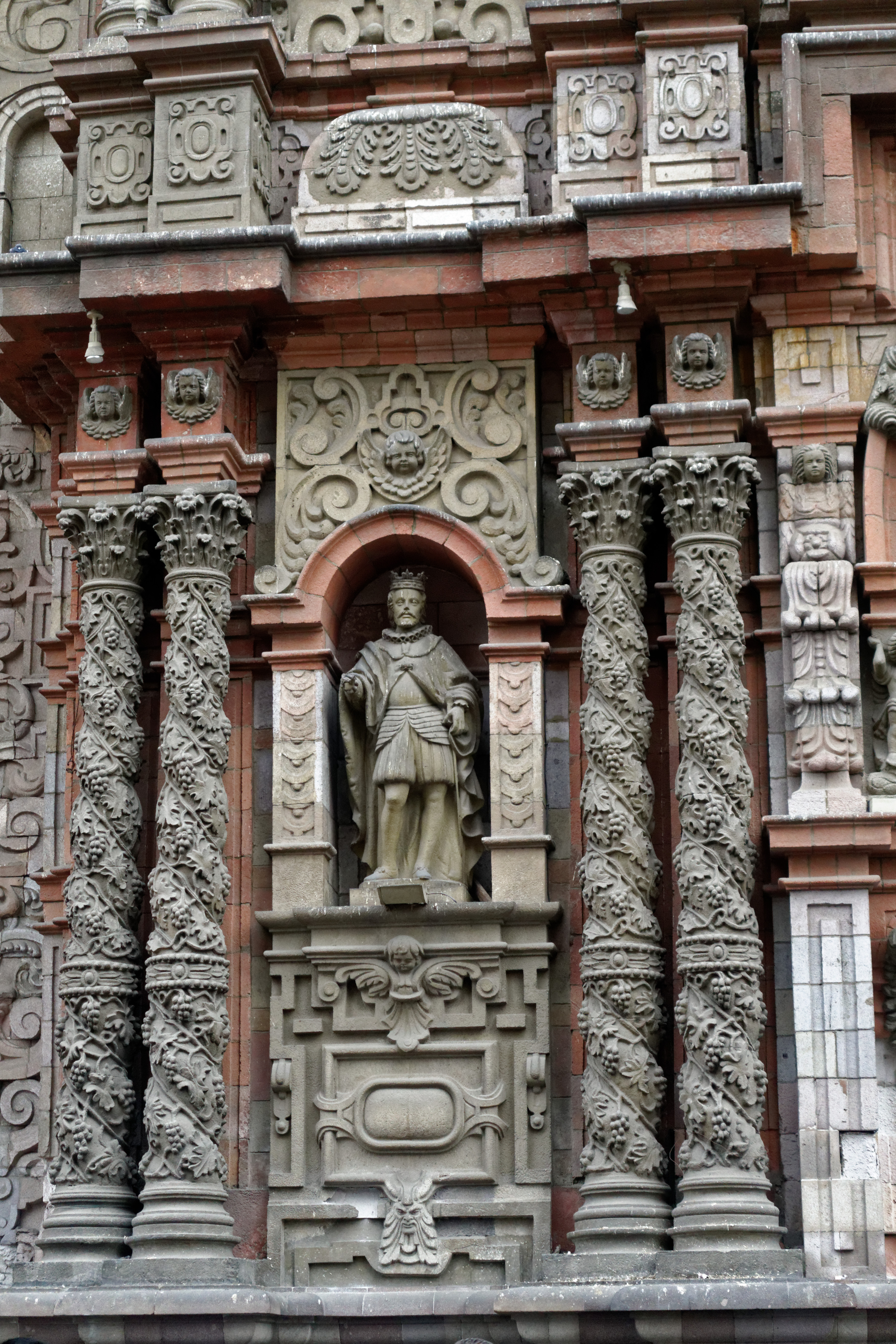
Solomonic Columns on the Baroque façade of Basilica of Nuestra Señora de la Merced in Lima built in 1614

Peter Paul Rubens employed Solomonic columns in tapestry designs, ca 1626 , where he provided a variant of an Ionic capital for the columns as Raphael had done, and rusticated and Solomonic columns appear in the architecture of his paintings with such consistency and in such variety that Anthony Blunt thought it would be pointless to give a complete list.

The columns became popular in Catholic Europe including southern Germany. The Solomonic column spread to Spain at about the same time as Bernini was making his new columns, and from Spain to Spanish colonies in the Americas, where the salomónica was often used in churches as an indispensable element of the Churrigueresque style. The design was most infrequently used in Britain, the south porch of St Mary the Virgin, Oxford, being the only exterior example found by Robert Durman, and was still rare in English interior design, an example noted by Durman is the funerary monument for Helena, Lady Gorges (died 1635) at Salisbury perhaps the sole use.

After 1660, such twist-turned columns became a familiar feature in the legs of French, Dutch and English furniture, and on the glazed doors that protected the dials of late 17th- and early 18th-century bracket and longcase clocks. English collectors and dealers sometimes call these twist-turned members "barley sugar twists" after the type of sweet traditionally sold in this shape.

== Gallery ==
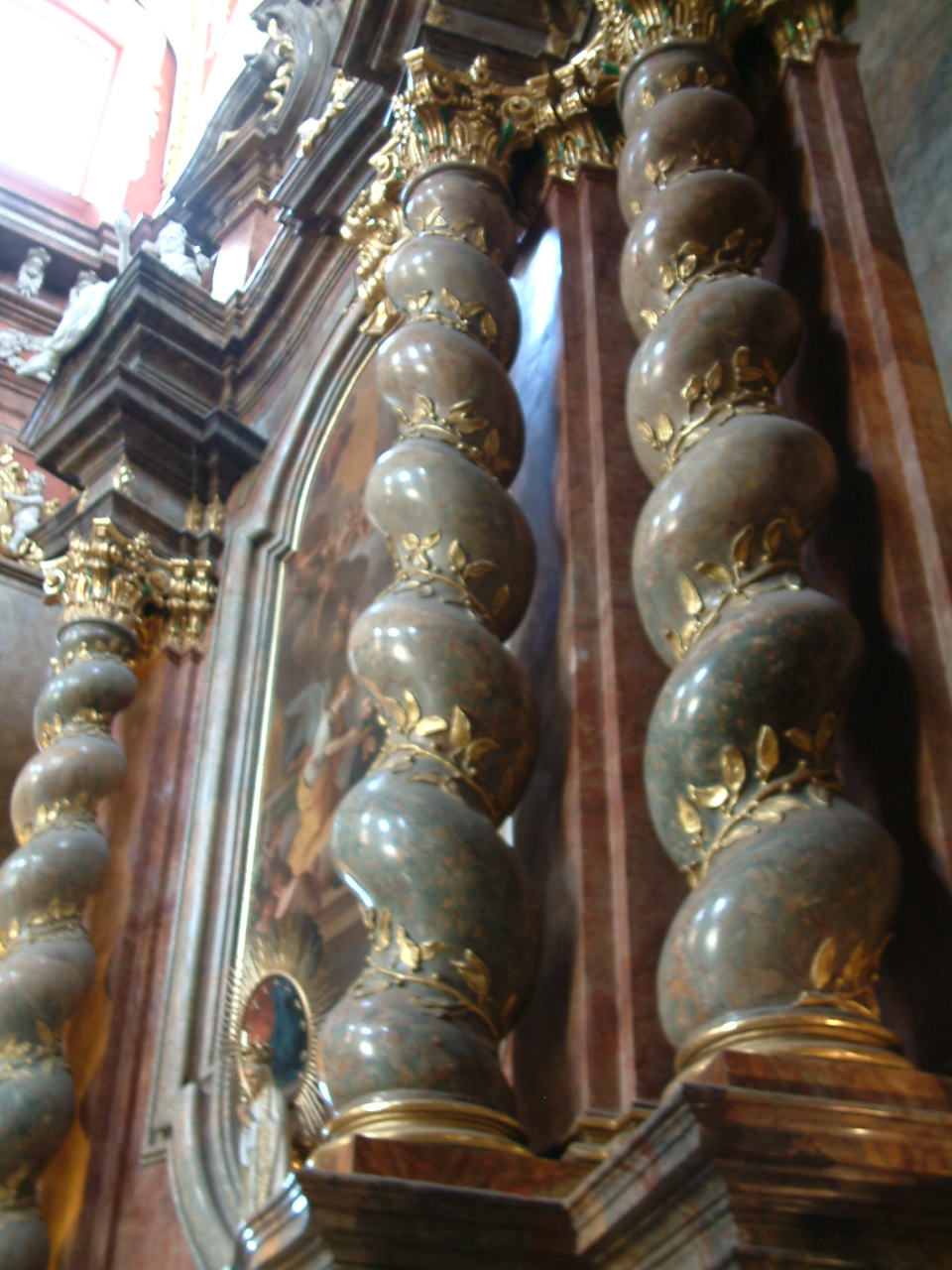
Solomonic columns applied with gilded vines on a side altar in former Jesuits' church in Poznań (Poland)

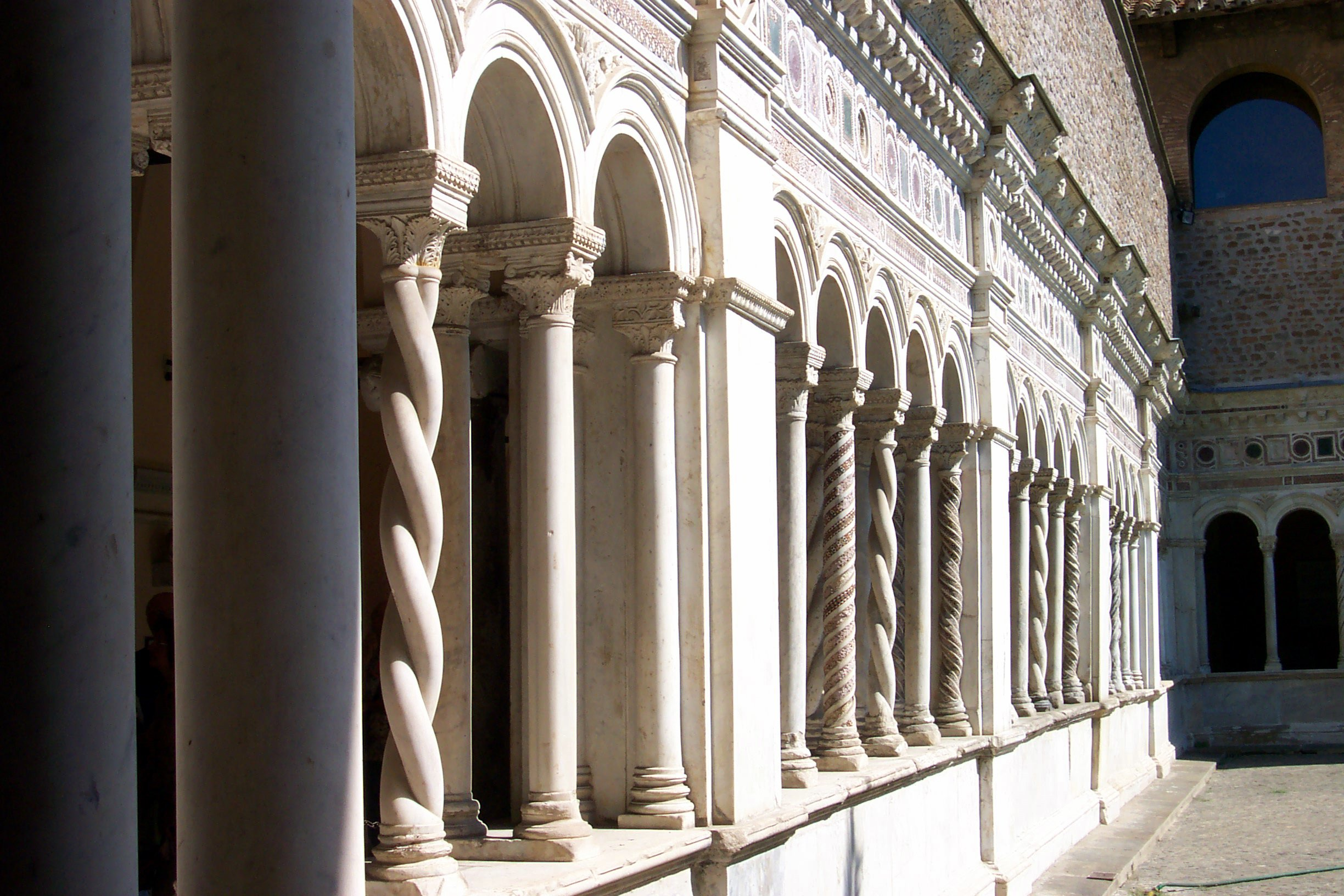
Solomonic columns and other fanciful variants in the cloister of St John Lateran, Rome, early 13th century

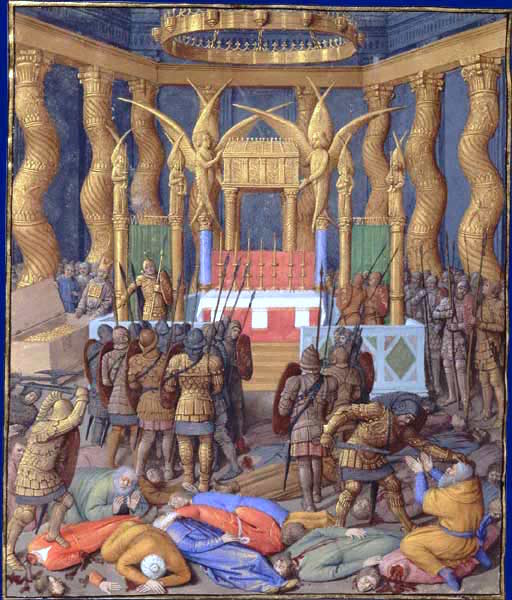
Pompey in the Temple of Jerusalem by Jean Fouquet, 1470–1475

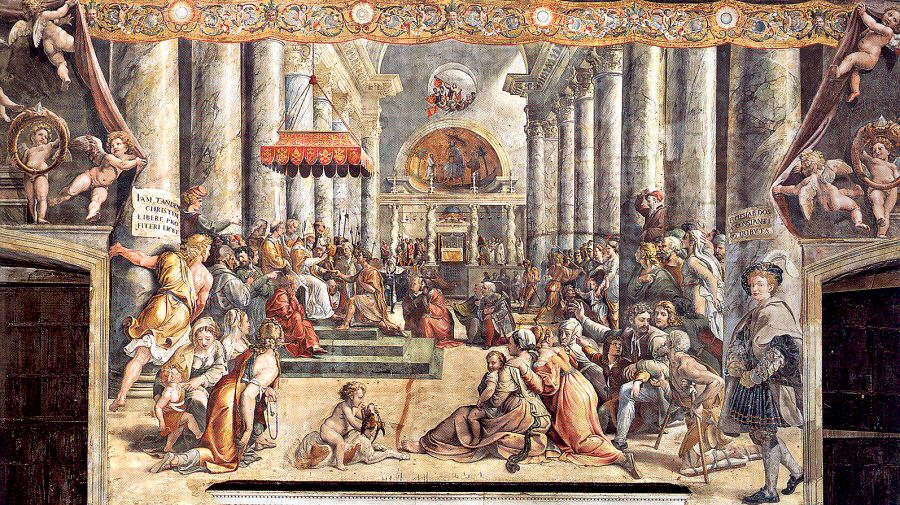
Raphael's workshop's Donation of Constantine shows St. Peter's Solomonic columns in their original location in front of the altar in the old basilica

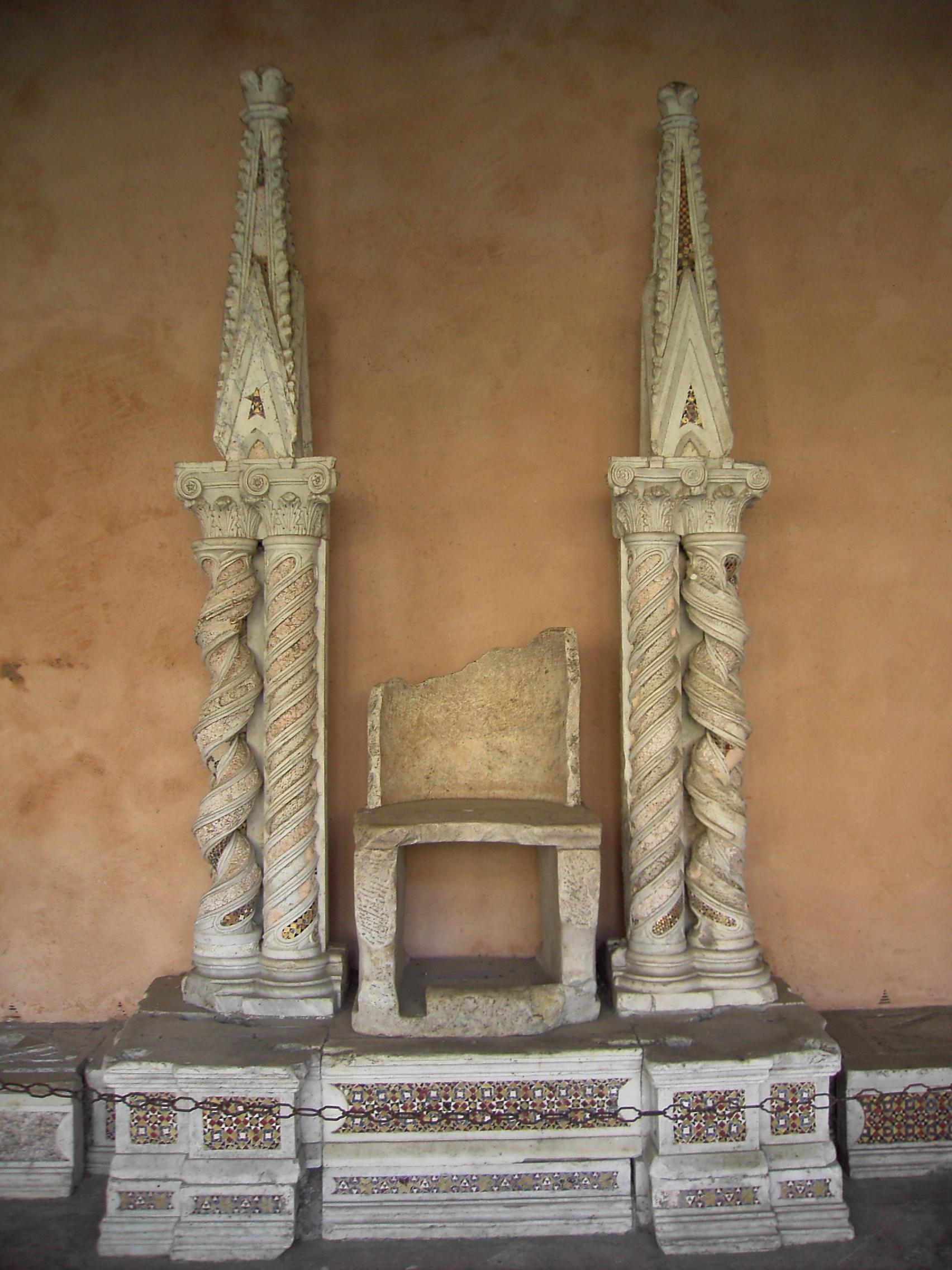
Papal throne from the cloister of St. John Lateran

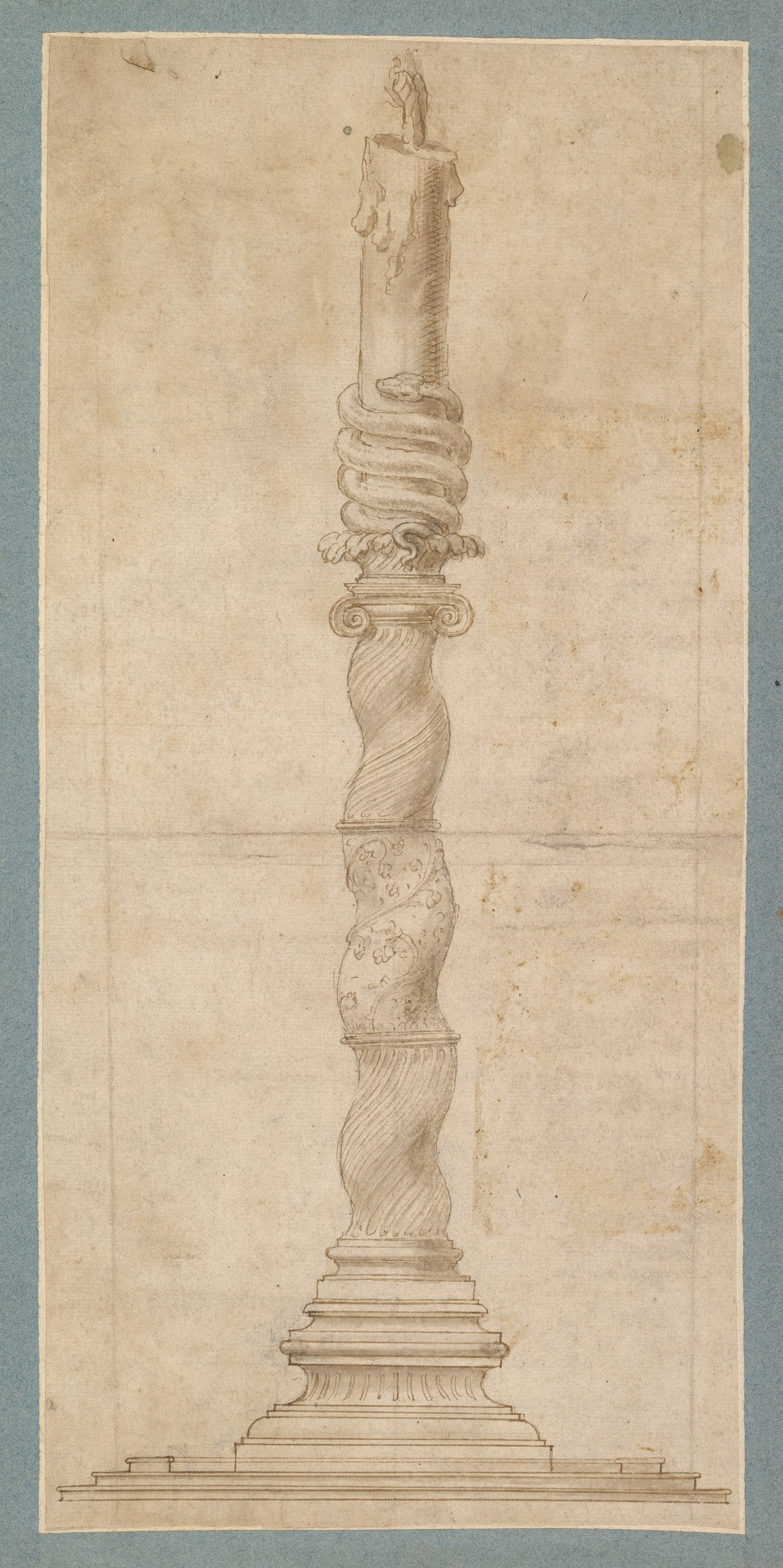
Renaissance design of a candlestick in form of an Ionic Solomonic column, circa 1530-1546

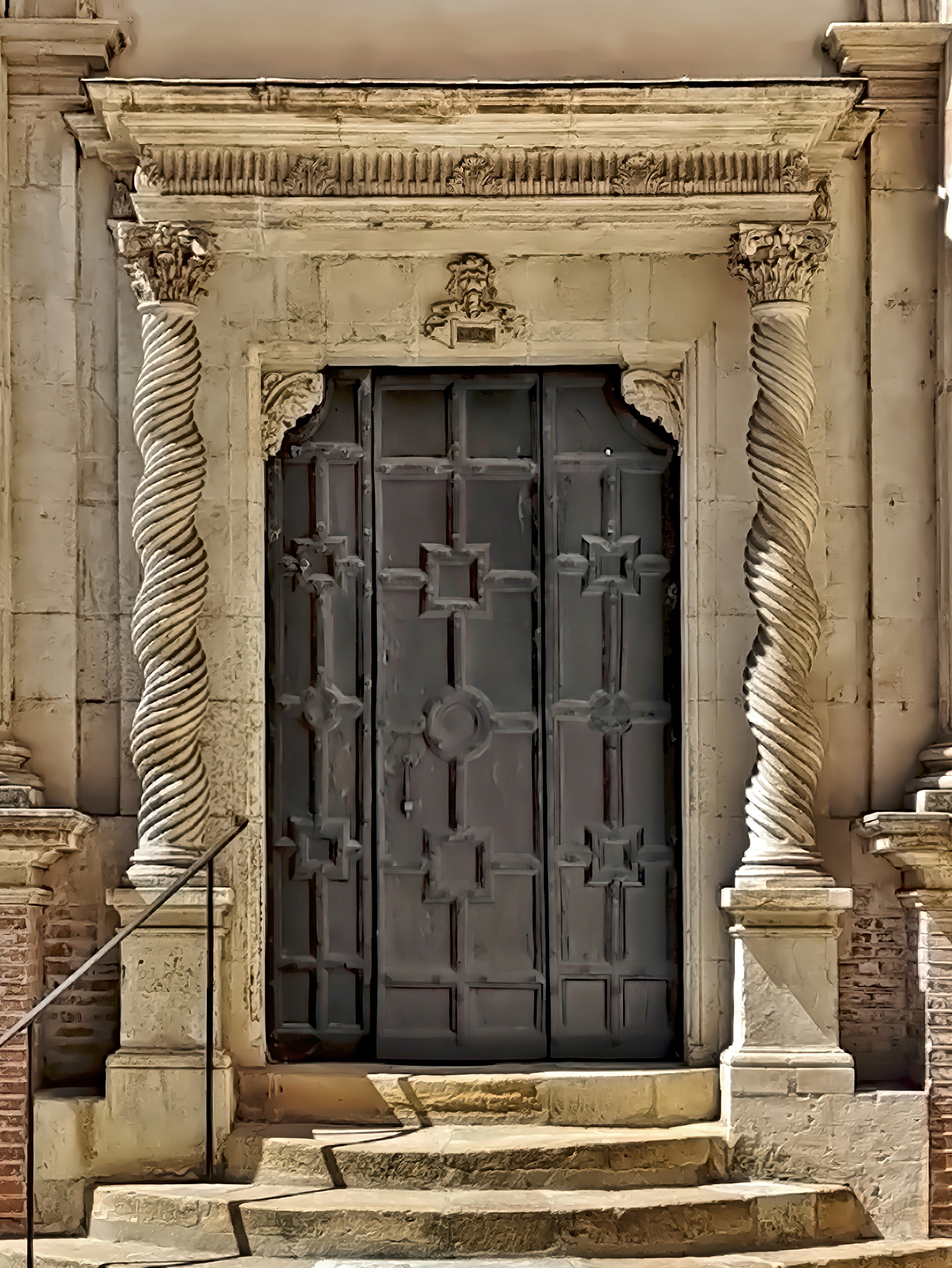
Renaissance door to the staircase of the Hôtel d'Assézat, Toulouse (France), 1555-1556.

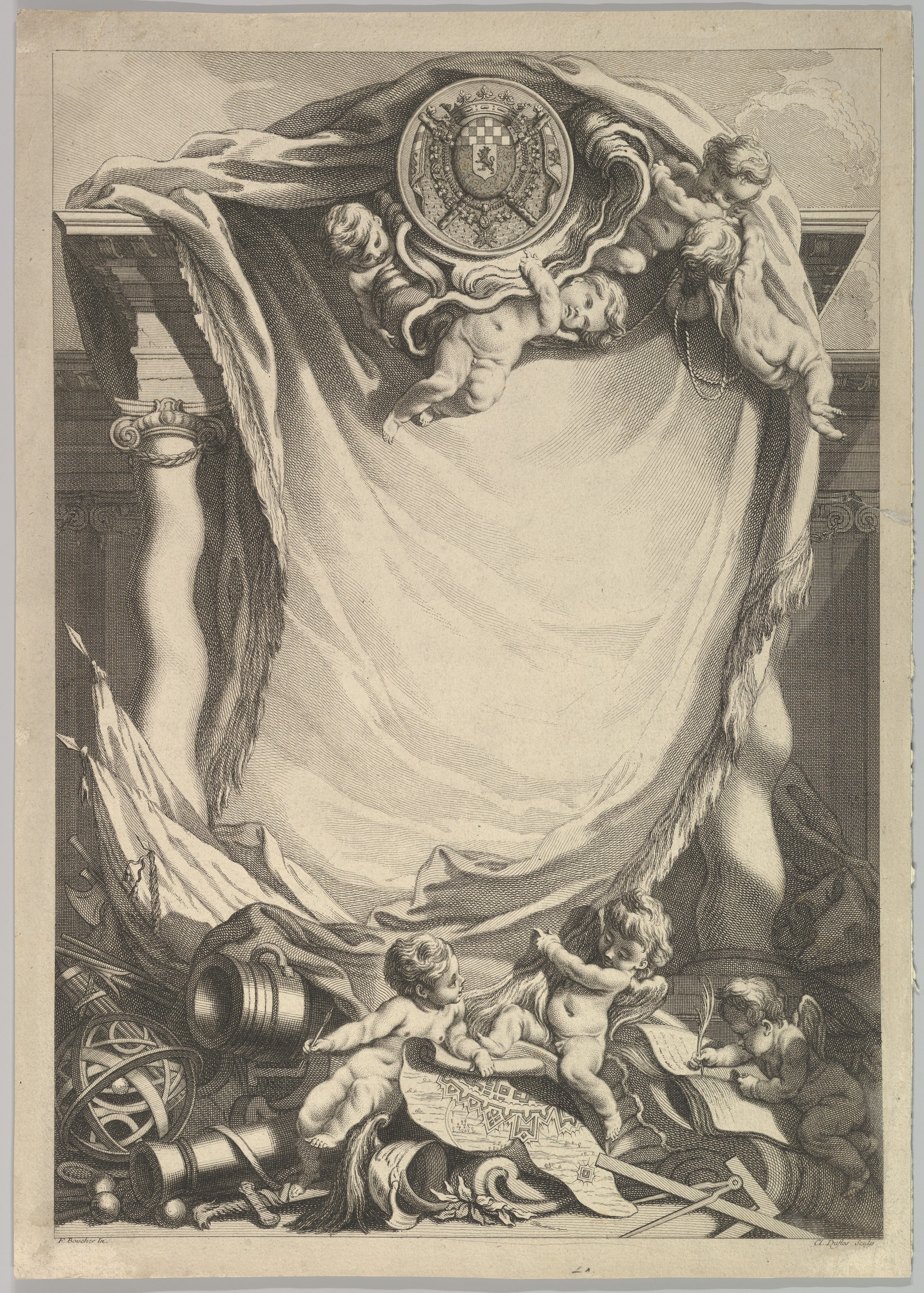
Print by François Boucher, in which appears a pair of Solomonic columns with Ionic capitals

== See also ==
- Boaz and Jachin
- Solomon
