= Camposagrado Palace (Oviedo) =

Coordinates: 43°21′45″N 5°50′43″W

- Spanish: Palacio de Camposagrado; Asturian: Palaciu de Campusagráu
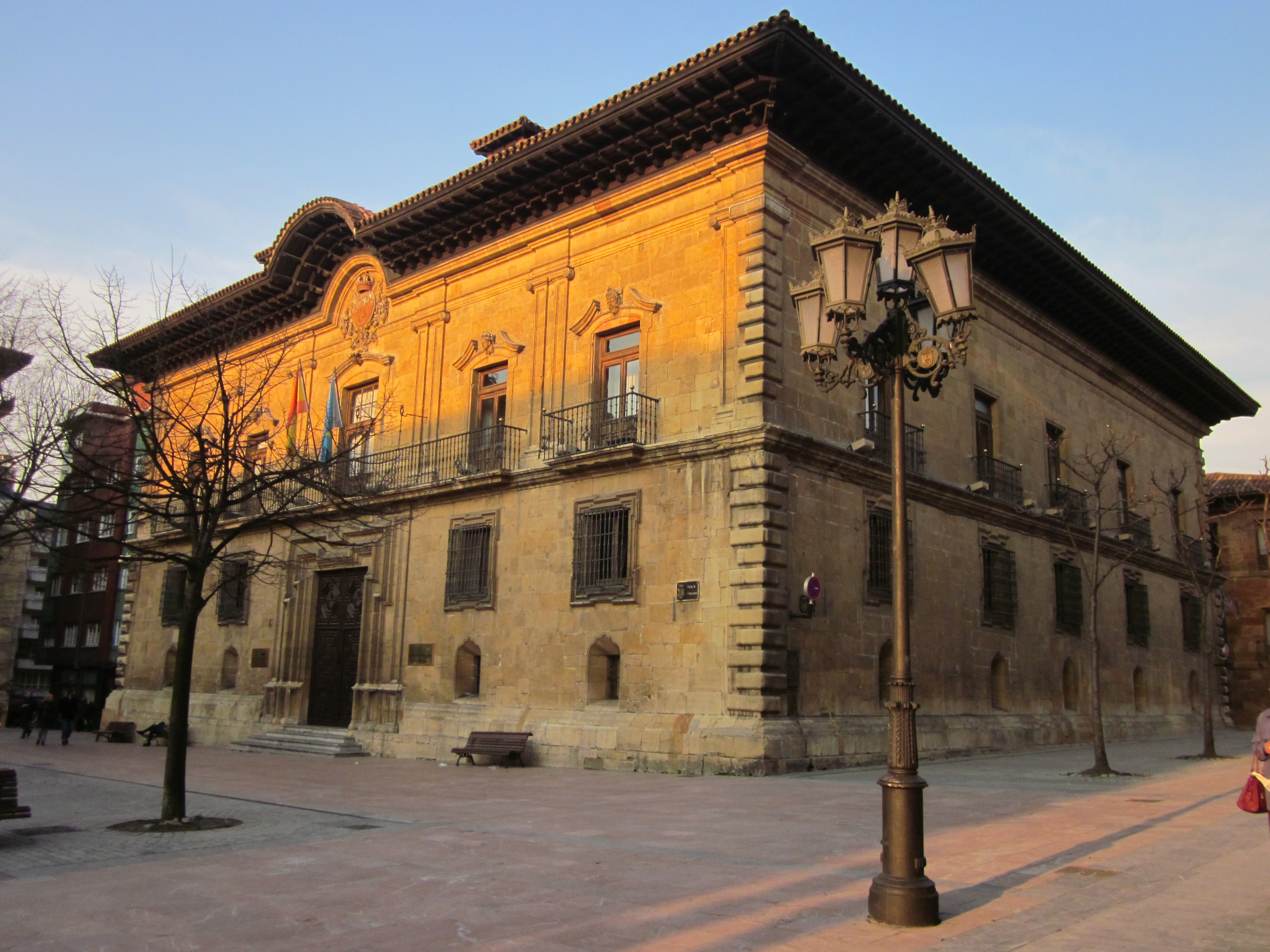
- Camposagrado Palace, 2011
- Interactive map of the Camposagrado Palace area

General information
- Architectural style: Lower floors: Baroque; Upper floors: Neoclassical
- Location: Oviedo, Principality of Asturias, Plaza Porlier, 3, Spain
- Construction started: 1719
- Completed: 1752
- Owner: Government of the Principality of Asturias

Design and construction
- Architects: Francisco de la Riva Ladrón de Guevara; Pedro Antonio Menéndez de Ambás

Camposagrado Palace is a baroque and Neo-classical palace located in the town of Oviedo, in Asturias, Spain. The building dates back to the eighteenth century and was built for the Marquis de Camposagrado, José Manuel Bernaldo de Quirós.

The architecture is an integration of styles and architects. Typically for urban palaces, it is a square building organized around a courtyard, with four façades of masonry walls lined with sandstone blocks and decorated with traditional quoins at the corners. The lower level was begun by Francisco de la Riva Ladrón de Guevara around 1728 and is principally built in the Baroque style. The upper floor began in 1744 by the architect Pedro Antonio Menéndez de Ambás and is distinguished by the Neo-Classical style, articulated with Ionic columns and rusticated blocks at the corners. The building has dual entryways—one from the side of Valdecarzana Palace on San Juan Street and the other from Porlier Square. Both entrances led to massive staircases heading upwards.

In 1934, during social upheaval of the Asturian miners' strike of 1934, the building was burned and had to be rehabilitated. The architect Enrique Rodríguez Bustelo completed the repairs and on 26 May 1943 it was declared a historic monument.

It presently houses the Regional Court of Asturias.
