= Odorico Raynaldi =

Italian historian and Oratorian

Odorico Raynaldi or Rinaldi (Latin: Odericus Raynaldus; 20 June 1594 – 22 January 1671), also known as Raynald, was an Italian historian and Oratorian.

== Biography ==
Raynaldi was born in Treviso to a patrician family and studied at Parma and Padua. He joined the Oratorians in Rome, where he was twice elected superior-general of his congregation. He was offered the direction of the Vatican Library by Innocent X, but declined the position. He died at Rome on 22 January 1671.

Raynaldi's major work was the continuation of the Annales Ecclesiastici of Baronius, extending it from 1198 to 1565 and including reproductions of numerous original documents. This was published at Rome, 1646-77; he also published excerpts in Latin and Italian both from the work of Baronius and his own continuation of it. The Catholic Encyclopedia criticizes his work for "inaccurate chronological data and lack of criticism", while valuing the primary sources reproduced in it.
