= Augustin Theiner =

German theologian and historian

Augustin Theiner, Cong.Orat., (11 April 1804, in Breslau – 8 August 1874, in Civitavecchia) was a German theologian and historian.

== Life ==
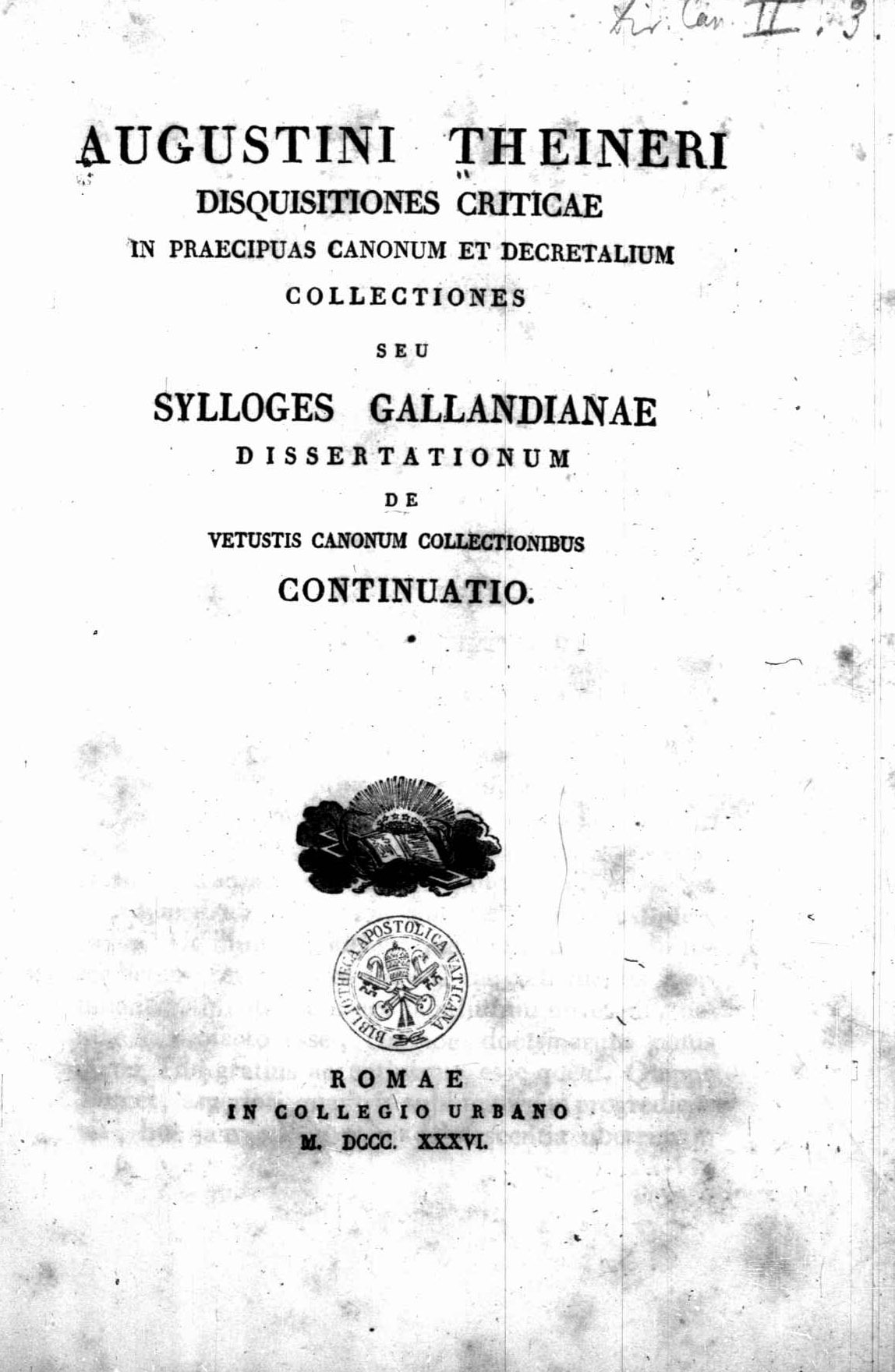
Disquisitiones criticae in praecipuas canonum et decretalium collectiones, 1836

Theiner was the son of a shoemaker. As a boy, he was a pupil at the gymnasium of St. Mathias at Breslau, Silesia, then in the Kingdom of Prussia, and studied theology in the same city. At the advice of his brother Anthony, Theiner abandoned theology and turned his attention to law, which he studied at Breslau and Halle, and in 1829, he obtained a degree in law at the latter university. He then received a scholarship from the Prussian Government, which enabled him to conduct research in Belgium, England, and France as to the sources of Canon law.

He finally went to Rome, where he settled permanently. Here, under the influence of Count Reisach, then rector of the Propaganda and later cardinal, the change in his opinions was completed. Soon after this, he became a priest and entered the Oratory of St. Philip Neri.

He was commissioned by Pope Pius IX, who had given him a position in the Vatican Library in 1850, to write the Geschichte des Pontifikats Klemens XIV (1853; Italian translation, 1855). In this work, he showed himself an opponent of the Jesuits, with whom he had been on good terms until 1844, so that the work was forbidden in the States of the Church.

In 1855, Pius IX appointed Theiner as Prefect of the Vatican Secret Archive.

Both before and during the First Vatican Council, he was in close connection with the opponents of papal infallibility. Because he communicated to them the order of business of the Council, which had been kept secret, he was deposed from his dignities and offices.

Whether he died at peace with the Church is questionable. His correspondence with the Old Catholic scholar, Johann Friedrich, during the years 1870-73 shows that he held the same views as the latter; on the other hand, Count Hermann Stainlein asserts that he knew Theiner during this period as a loyal Catholic priest. In any event, he was buried at the Teutonic Cemetery, adjacent to St. Peter's Basilica, which is reserved for German-speaking residents of the city in service to the institutions of the Catholic Church.

== Works ==
As young men, Theiner and his brother Anthony wrote Einfuhrung der erzwungenen Ehelosigkeit bei den Geistlichen (1828).

After converting to Catholicism, Theiner wrote Geschichte der geistlichen Bildungsanstalten (1835) and Disquisitiones criticae (1836), on the sources of canon law.

After becoming a priest, Theiner wrote:

- Die neuesten Zustände der kath. Kirche in Polen und Russland (1841)
- Die Rückkehr der regierenden Hauser Braunschweig und Sachsen zur kath. Kirche (1843)
- Zustände der kath. Kirche in Schlesien 1740-58 (1846)
- Kardinal Frankenberg (1850)

As prefect of the Vatican Secret Archive, he published:

- Die Fortsetzung der Annalen des Baronius (3 vols., 1856)
- Vetera monumenta Hungariae (2 vols., 1859–60)
- Poloniae et Lithuaniae (4 vols., 1860–64)
- Slavorum meridionalium (2 vols., 1863)
- Hibernorum et Scotorum (1864)
- Codex dominii temporalis apostolicae sedis (3 vols., 1861–62)
- Monumenta spectantia ad unionem ecclesiarum Graecae et Romanae (1872).

After his death appeared the work, Acta genuina Concilii Tridentini (1874), very imperfectly edited.

- Disquisitiones criticae in praecipuas canonum et decretalium collectiones (in Latin). Rome: Collegio Urbano. 1836.
