= The Coronation of Charlemagne =

1516–1517 painting by Raphael

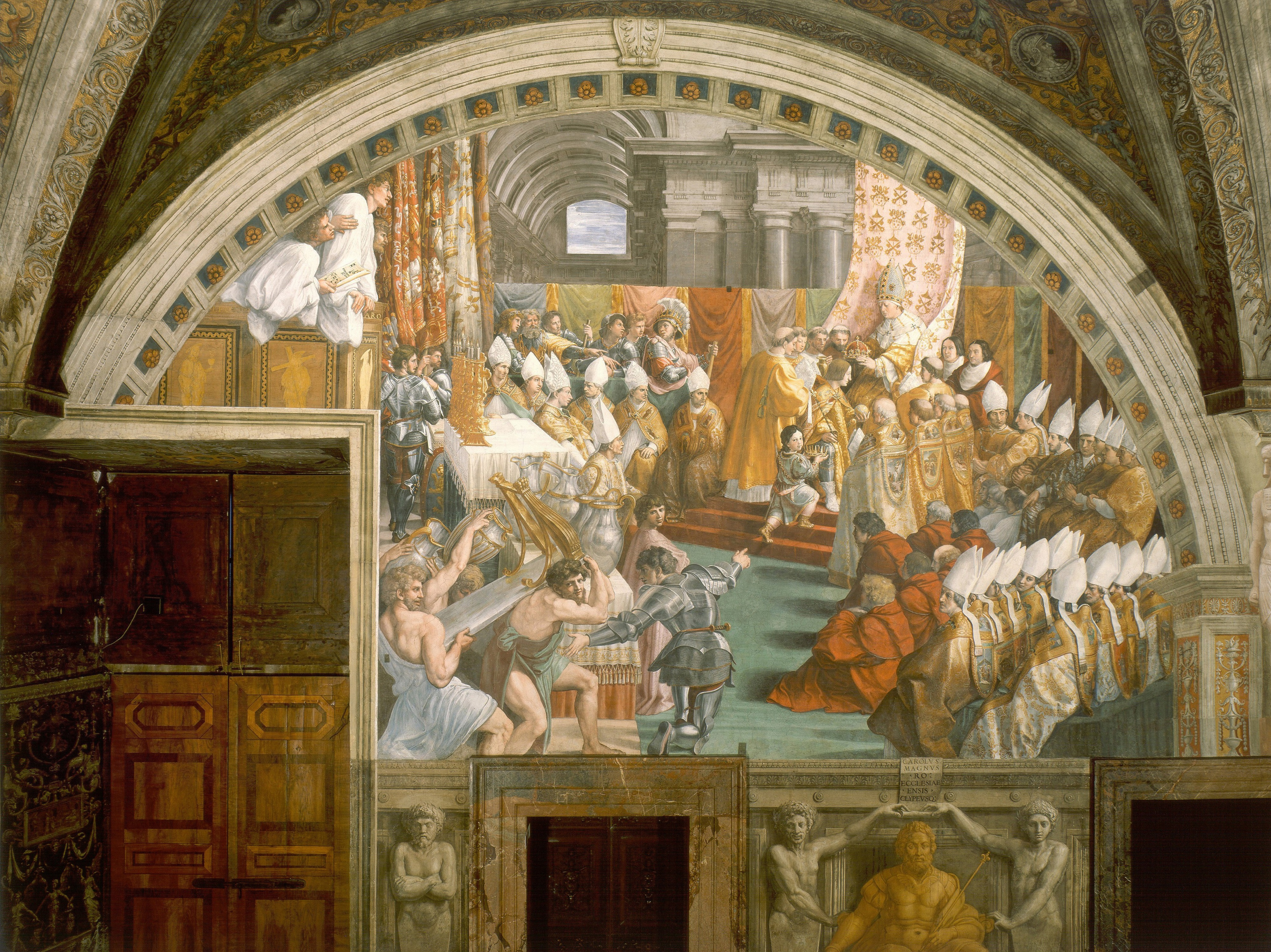
- Artist: Workshop of Raphael
- Year: 1516–1517
- Type: Fresco
- Dimensions: 670 cm (260 in) wide
- Location: Apostolic Palace, Vatican Museums; Vatican City

The Coronation of Charlemagne is a painting by the workshop of the Italian Renaissance artist Raphael. Though it is believed that Raphael did make the designs for the composition, the fresco was probably painted by Gianfrancesco Penni. The painting was part of Raphael's commission to decorate the rooms that are now known as the Stanze di Raffaello, in the Apostolic Palace in the Vatican. It is located in the room that was named after The Fire in the Borgo, the Stanza dell'incendio del Borgo.

The painting shows how Charlemagne was crowned Imperator Romanorum by Pope Leo III (pontiff from 795 to 816) on Christmas Evening, 800. Behind Charlemagne, a child page holds the royal crown that he just took off to receive the imperial one.

It is quite likely that the fresco refers to the Concordat of Bologna, negotiated between the Holy See and the kingdom of France in 1515, since Leo III is in fact a portrait of Leo X and Charlemagne a portrait of Francis I. According to Giorgio Vasari, the child page holding the royal crown is a portrait of the infant Ippolito de' Medici.

== See also ==
- Iconography of Charlemagne
