= The Meeting of Leo the Great and Attila =

Painting by Raphael

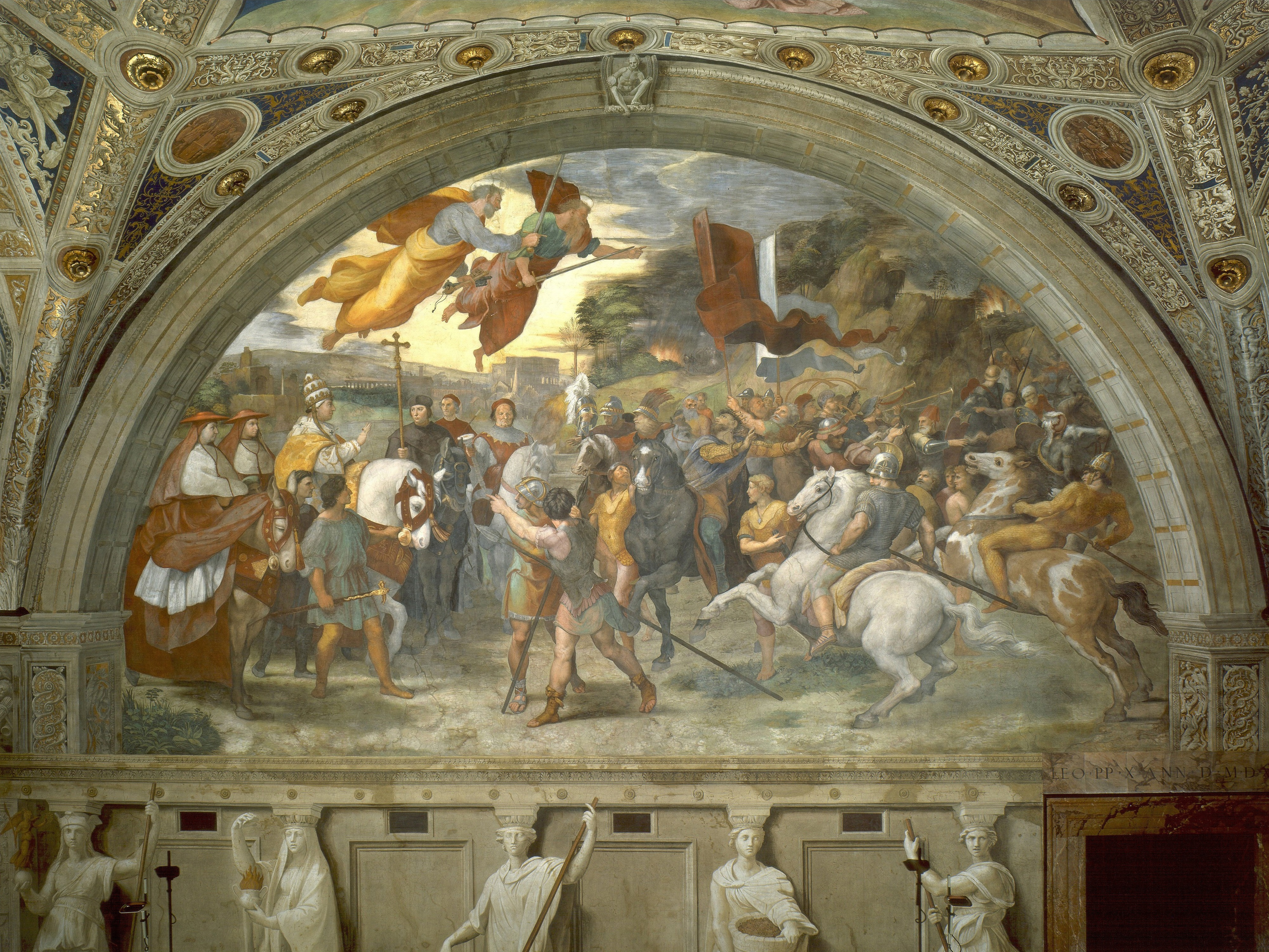
- Artist: Raphael
- Year: 1513-1514
- Type: Fresco
- Dimensions: 500 cm × 750 cm (200 in × 300 in)
- Location: Apostolic Palace, Vatican Museums, Vatican City

The Meeting of Leo I and Attila is a fresco through the Italian Renaissance artist Raphael. It was painted from 1513 to 1514 as part of Raphael's commission to decorate the rooms that are now known as the Stanze di Raffaello, in the Apostolic Palace in the Vatican. It is located in the Stanza di Eliodoro, which is named after The Expulsion of Heliodorus from the Temple.

The painting depicts the meeting between the Pope Leo I and Attila the Hun, which took place in 452 in northern Italy. Initially, Raphael depicted Leo I with the face of Pope Julius II but after Julius' death, Raphael changed the painting to resemble the new pope, Leo X. Leo X appears both as cardinal and as pope. The images of Saint Peter and Saint Paul appear in the sky bearing swords, and were said to have helped keep the king of the Huns from invading Italy.

The left half of the painting is mainly by Raphael, with only minimal work by his students. The result of this fresco exhibits great artistic skill, due to the usage of dark and light pigments which amplify the peaceful and the aggressive movements. It showcases a comparison of good and evil, which ties in the political and religious perspective of the Pope, who commissioned the work.

== Historical context ==
In 1514, the Pope hired young Raphael to reimagine the project to decorate the rooms of the Vatican as the chief architect. Perhaps, due to Raphael's family's success in the arts, he was given the opportunity to be commissioned for the paintings in the Vatican. However, Raphael had also proven himself to be a more successful painter than his father, while still in his teenage years. Once he was the chief architect for the Vatican, it resulted in the destruction of the previous frescoes that had been created in the Vatican, and marked the time in which Raphael began to create the famous Vatican frescoes that still exist today. Though Raphael is mostly attributed for the creation of The Meeting of Leo the Great and Attila, his assistants painted much of it, as he directed, and they continued to finish the project even after his early death. Some of the accredited assistants include: Raffaellino del Colle, Giulio Romano, and Gianfrancesco Penni. This fresco, amongst the others in the Room of Heliodorus glorified the Church.

== Subject ==
The main figure in this painting is Attila, the king of the Huns, who began to seriously threaten Italy in 452 AD. Pope Leo I was sent out to meet the Hun king and to attempt to persuade him to spare Italy. Their meeting is thought to have taken place near Mantua. This area was known for its association to Christianity, adding to the symbolism of finding a peaceful resolution.

The other major figure was Leo I, who reigned from 440. Both the pope and the general Roman public found that it would be best to work towards peace, even by means of begging. Pope Leo I led in hopes to come to an agreement where violence was avoided. The result was peaceful, as the Pope's approach to the situation allowed Attila to cease any plans of warfare.

The Emperor of Rome realized that the odds of them being victorious against Attila and the Huns was slim, and yet Leo exhibited bravery, because he relied on his faith when going against this great foe.

== Interpretation ==
The moment that is shown in this fresco includes political and faith-based themes because of the contrast of the agitated Huns and the religious authorities. Though a battle was expected, Attila the Hun decided to not engage in battle, and there have been various perspectives as to why he changed his mind. Historians prefer the explanation that the Huns withdrew because they may have suffered from lack of food and care, leading them to be ill or hungry. Though this seems to be an explanation that can be easily understood, there is not sufficient evidence to even prove that the Huns were lacking food at all in the northern region of Italy where they were located. This estimation of their location resulted from the careful calculations of academics.

However, the idea of food scarcity was not accepted by all scholars who wanted to find the reason for the peaceful conclusion. Another theory that was proposed explains that the Huns left early because of the changing seasons, knowing that survival was much more difficult during the winter. So the idea that is being proposed is that they left in order to avoid the cold climate coming due to winter, and that they had all of the food provisions that were necessary.

The painting, however, indicates that the Huns withdrew because of the spiritual presences of the Christian martyrs, Apostle Peter and Paul. They are shown to be working alongside Pope Leo I in order to help prevent Attila from invading. Since Peter and Paul had brought much success to the spreading of the Gospel of Jesus and lived righteous lives, they were able to influence Attila's thoughts, and even remind him of God, who has more power than Attila. This interpretations argues that Attila believed in Leo's words after thinking deeply about what had been said, since he seems to have sided with the papal nobility and have faith as well.

There are interpretations that view the people alongside Attila the Hun as barbarians. The connotation and definition leave the viewer seeing them as being lowly and uncultured, when that was likely not the case. This is significant because the piece also includes one of Attila's men standing his ground, facing the pope, and reaching out his hand towards the pope's entourage. This is significant in showing that there may not be total unity amongst this group. Additionally, the figure who is defying also has a feathered headdress, connecting him to the indigenous people of the Americas. Europeans considered the Native Americans to be barbarians as well, and that they should be conquered, for the benefit of humanity. So, this figure with the feather on his head indicates that Raphael may also want to paint the image of Native American defiance for the public to see. The features of all of the faces including the Native American though, are clearly with European features, because for many years, Europeans did not actually know how Native Americans looked and acted, since their form of information was based upon the stories told by the few who visited the Americas in person. Accurate depictions are not expected until the 17th century, and so this piece is shown to lack historical authenticity, as these realities are clarified.

== Legacy ==
The same topic was addressed by Alessandro Algardi in his baroque masterpiece, a marble relief of Fuga d'Attila (c. 1650) in St Peter's Basilica.
