= Leo III =

Leo III, Leon III, or Levon III may refer to:

== People ==
- Leo III the Isaurian (685–741), Byzantine emperor 717–741
- Pope Leo III (d. 816), Pope 795–816
- Leon III of Abkhazia, King of Abkhazia 960–969
- Leo II, King of Armenia (c. 1236–1289), sometimes referred to as Leo III, ruled from 1269 to 1289.
- Leo III, King of Armenia (1287–1307), ruled from 1303 to 1307

== Other uses ==
- Leo A, an irregular galaxy in the constellation of Leo
- The Oath of Leo III, 16th-century painting about the 9th century Pope Leo III
- LEO III (computer), an early computer used for commercial business applications
