= Deathbed conversion =

Adoption of a particular religious faith shortly before dying

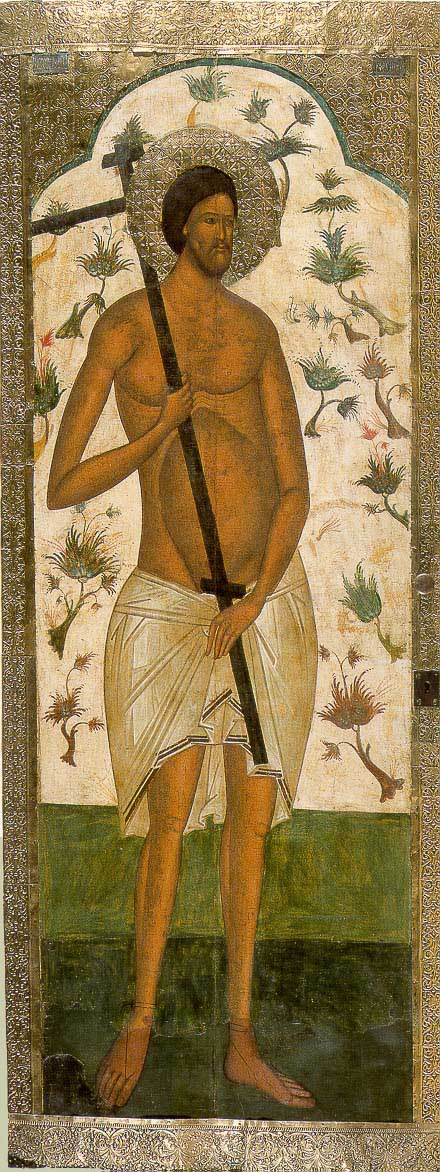
Russian Orthodox icon of The Good Thief in Paradise (Moscow school, c. 1560)

A deathbed conversion is the adoption of a particular religious faith shortly before dying. Making a conversion on one's deathbed may reflect an immediate change of belief, a desire to formalize longer-term beliefs, or a desire to complete a process of conversion already underway. Claims of the deathbed conversion of famous or influential figures have also been used in history as rhetorical devices.

== Overview ==
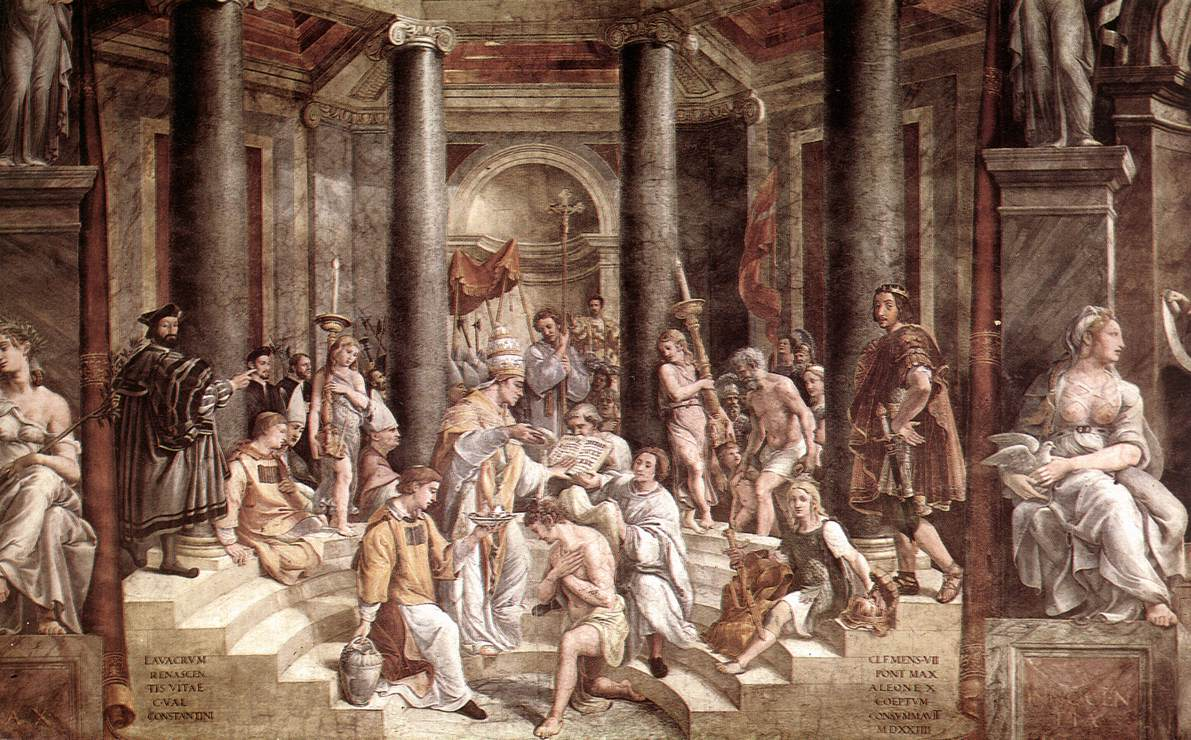
The Baptism of Constantine, as imagined by students of Raphael

Conversions at the point of death have a long history. The first recorded deathbed conversion appears in the Gospel of Luke where the good thief, crucified beside Jesus, expresses belief in Christ. Jesus accepts his conversion, saying "Today you shall be with Me in Paradise".

Perhaps the most momentous conversion in Western history was that of Constantine I, Roman Emperor and later proclaimed a Christian Saint by the Eastern Orthodox Church. While his belief in Christianity occurred long before his death, it was only on his deathbed that he was baptised, in 337 by the Arian bishop Eusebius of Nicomedia, While traditional sources disagree as to why this happened so late, modern historiography concludes that Constantine chose religious tolerance as an instrument to bolster his reign. According to Bart Ehrman, all Christians contemporary to Constantine got baptized on their deathbed since they firmly believed that continuing to sin after baptism would ensure their eternal damnation. Ehrman sees no conflict between Constantine's Paganism and him being a Christian.

== Notable deathbed conversions to Catholicism ==
=== Buffalo Bill ===
Buffalo Bill was baptized Catholic one day before his death in 1917.

=== Charles II of England ===
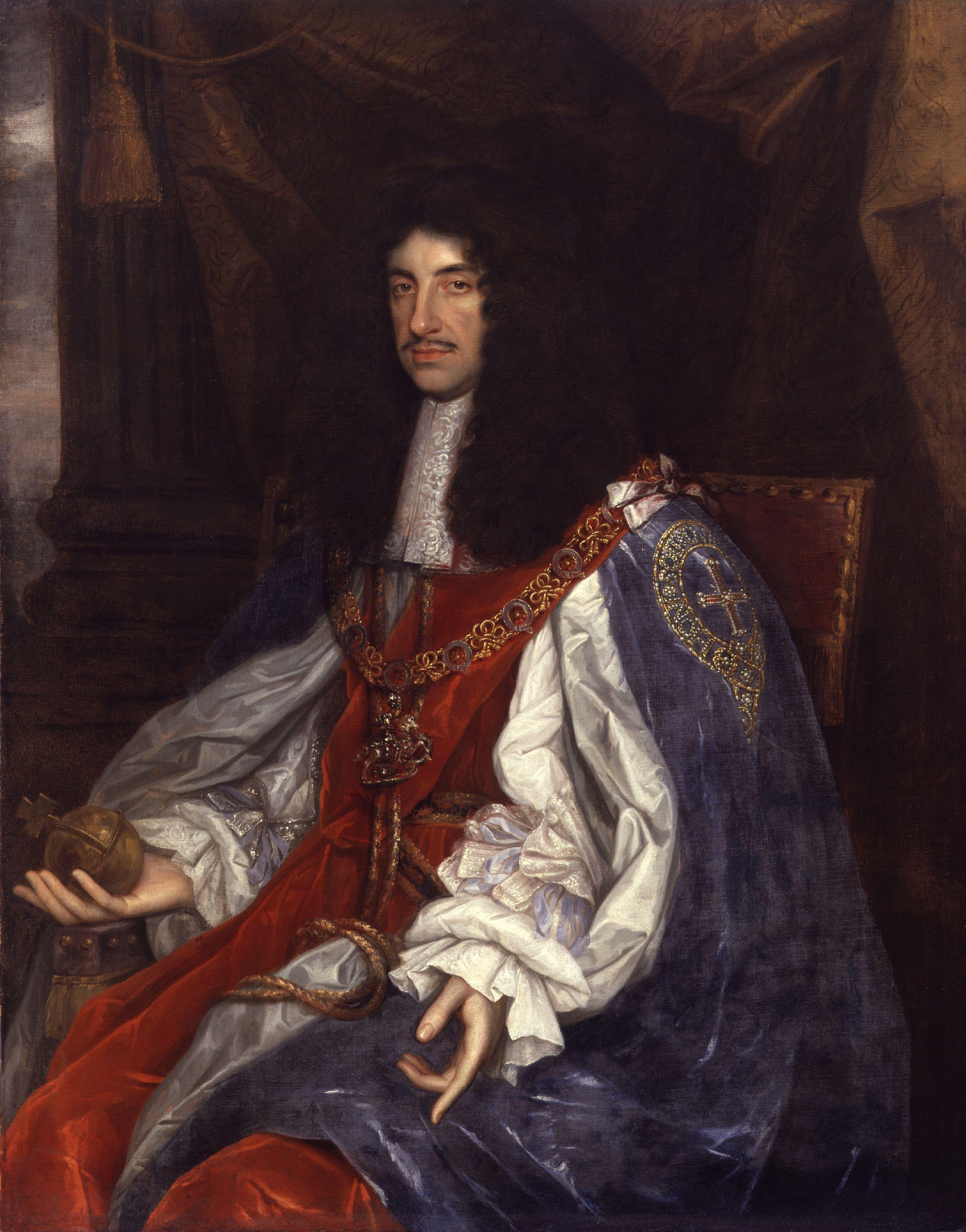
Charles II of England, the penultimate Catholic monarch of England.

Charles II of England reigned in an Anglican nation at a time of strong religious conflict. Though his sympathies were at least somewhat with the Roman Catholic faith, he ruled as an Anglican, though he attempted to lessen the persecution and legal penalties affecting non-Anglicans in England, notably through the Royal Declaration of Indulgence. As he lay dying following a stroke, released of the political need, he was received into the Catholic Church.

=== Jean de La Fontaine ===
The most famous French fabulist published a revised edition of his greatest work, Contes, in 1692, the same year that he began to suffer a severe illness. Under such circumstances, Jean de La Fontaine turned to religion. A young priest, M. Poucet, tried to persuade him about the impropriety of the Contes, and it is said that the destruction of a new play of some merit was demanded and submitted to as a proof of repentance. La Fontaine received the Viaticum, and the following years, he continued to write poems and fables. He died in 1695.

=== Joel Chandler Harris ===
Joel Chandler Harris was married to a Catholic woman, Mary Bullard of Gabriel Tolliver. He sought baptism on June 20, 1908, a few weeks before his death on July 3.

=== Sir Allan Napier MacNab ===
Sir Allan Napier MacNab, Canadian political leader, died 8 August 1862 in Hamilton, Ontario. His deathbed conversion to Catholicism caused a furor in the press in the following days. The Toronto Globe and the Hamilton Spectator expressed strong doubts about the conversion, and the Anglican rector of Christ Church in Hamilton declared that MacNab died a Protestant. MacNab's Catholic baptism is recorded at St. Mary's Cathedral in Hamilton, performed by John, Bishop of Hamilton, on 7 August 1862. Lending credibility to this conversion, MacNab's second wife, who predeceased him, was Catholic, and their two daughters were raised as Catholics.

=== Charles Maurras ===
In the last days before his death, French author Charles Maurras readopted the Catholic faith of his childhood and received the last rites.

=== Oscar Wilde ===
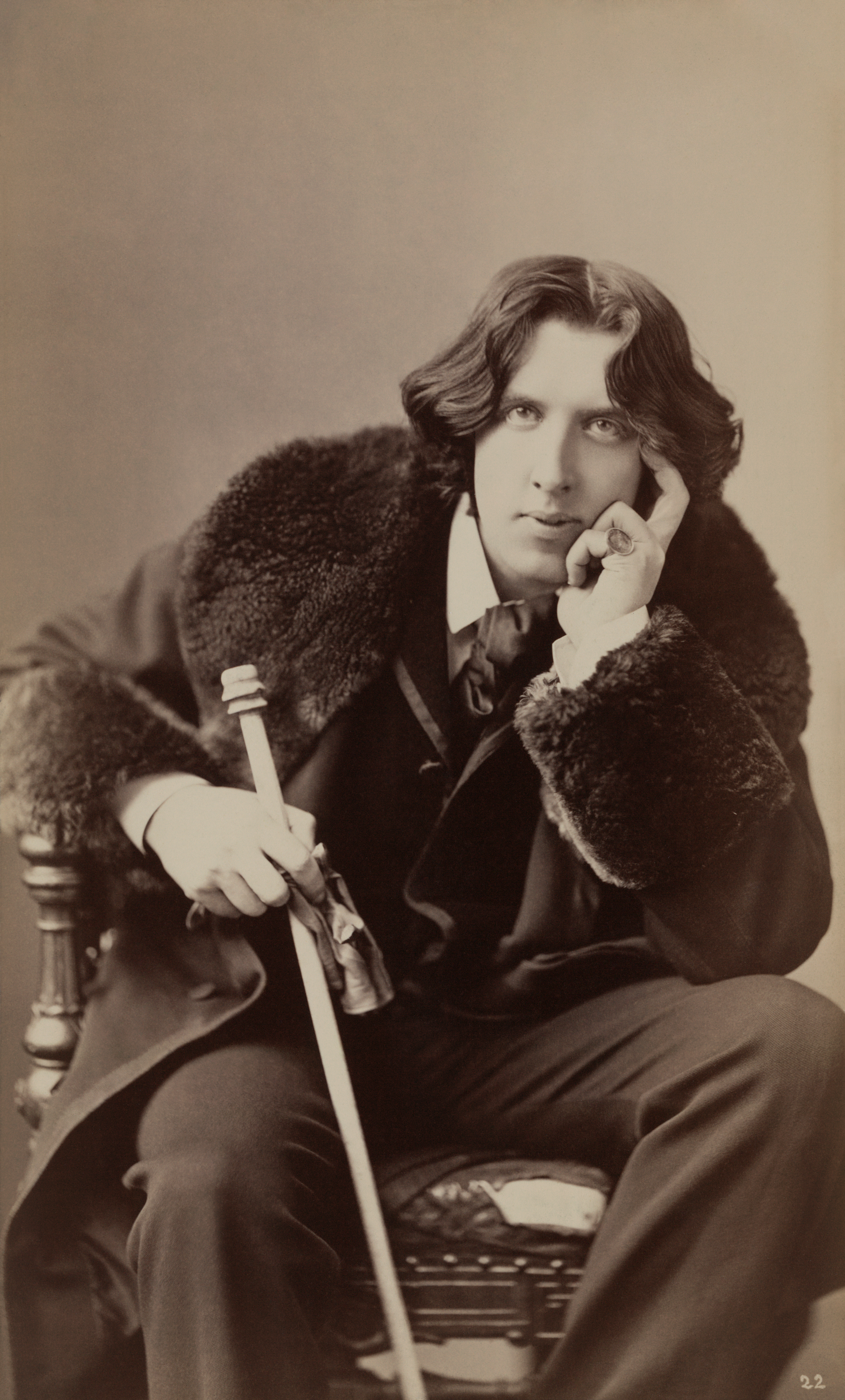
Oscar Wilde

Author and wit Oscar Wilde converted to Catholicism during his final illness. Robert Ross gave a clear and unambiguous account: "When I went for the priest to come to his death-bed he was quite conscious and raised his hand in response to questions and satisfied the priest, Father Cuthbert Dunne of the Passionists. It was the morning before he died and for about three hours he understood what was going on (and knew I had come from the South in response to a telegram) that he was given the last sacrament." The Passionist house in Avenue Hoche, has a house journal which contains a record, written by Dunne, of his having received Wilde into full communion with the Church. While Wilde's conversion may have come as a surprise, he had long maintained an interest in the Catholic Church, having met with Pope Pius IX in 1877 and describing the Roman Catholic Church as "for saints and sinners alone – for respectable people, the Anglican Church will do". However, how much of a believer in all the tenets of Catholicism Wilde ever was is arguable: in particular, against Ross's insistence on the truth of Catholicism: "No, Robbie, it isn't true." "My position is curious," Wilde epigrammatised, "I am not a Catholic: I am simply a violent Papist."

In his poem Ballad of Reading Gaol, Wilde wrote:

Ah! Happy they whose hearts can break
And peace of pardon win!
How else may man make straight his plan
And cleanse his soul from Sin?
How else but through a broken heart
May Lord Christ enter in?

=== John Wayne ===
American actor and filmmaker John Wayne, according to his son Patrick and his grandson Matthew Muñoz, who was a priest in the California Diocese of Orange, converted to Roman Catholicism shortly before his death. Muñoz stated that Wayne expressed a degree of regret about not becoming a Catholic earlier in life, explaining "that was one of the sentiment he expressed before he passed on, "blaming" a busy life."

== Alleged deathbed conversions ==
=== Charles Darwin ===
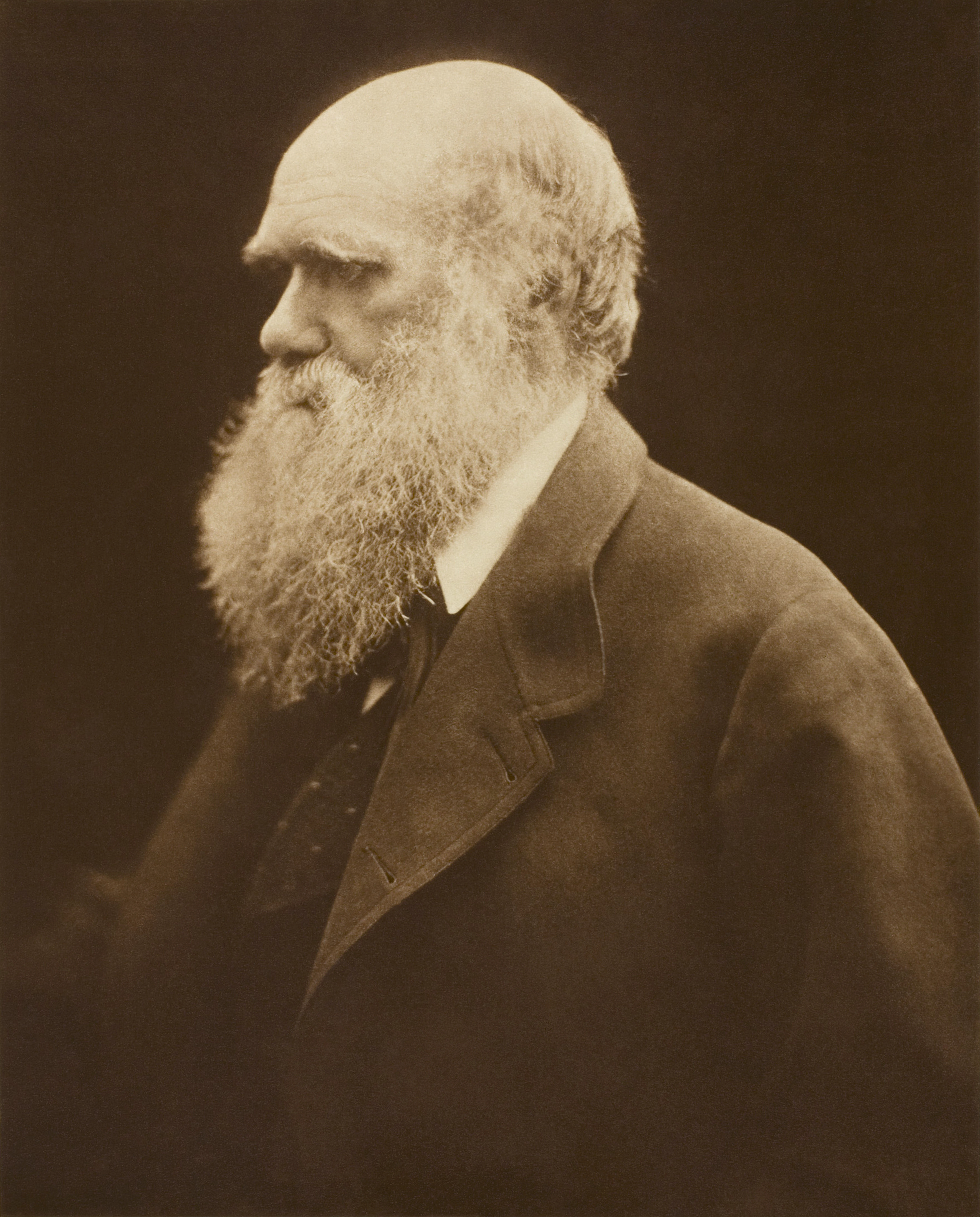
After Charles Darwin died, rumours spread that he had converted to Christianity on his deathbed. His children denied this occurred.

One famous example is Charles Darwin's deathbed conversion in which it was claimed (in 1915) by Lady Hope that Darwin said: "How I wish I had not expressed my theory of evolution as I have done." He went on to say that he would like her to gather a congregation since he "would like to speak to them of Christ Jesus and His salvation, being in a state where he was eagerly savoring the heavenly anticipation of bliss." Lady Hope's story was printed in the Boston Watchman Examiner. The story spread, and the claims were republished as late as October 1955 in the Reformation Review and in the Monthly Record of the Free Church of Scotland in February 1957.

Lady Hope's story is not supported by Darwin's children. Darwin's son Francis Darwin accused her of lying, saying that "Lady Hope's account of my father's views on religion is quite untrue. I have publicly accused her of falsehood, but have not seen any reply." Darwin's daughter Henrietta Litchfield also called the story a fabrication, saying:

"I was present at his deathbed. Lady Hope was not present during his last illness, or any illness. I believe he never even saw her, but in any case she had no influence over him in any department of thought or belief. He never recanted any of his scientific views, [n]either then or earlier. We think the story of his conversion was fabricated in the U.S.A. The whole story has no foundation whatever."

=== Doc Holliday ===
According to an obituary by the Glenwood Springs Ute Chief', Doc Holliday had been baptized in the Catholic Church shortly before he died. This was based on correspondence written between Holliday and his cousin, Sister Mary Melanie Holliday (a Catholic Nun), though no baptismal record has ever been found.

=== Edward VII ===
King Edward VII of the U.K. is alleged by some to have converted to Roman Catholicism on his deathbed, with other accounts alleging he converted secretly two months before his death.

=== Wallace Stevens ===
The poet Wallace Stevens is said to have been baptized a Catholic during his last days suffering from stomach cancer. This account is disputed, particularly by Stevens's daughter, Holly, and critic, Helen Vendler, who, in a letter to James Wm. Chichetto, thought Fr. Arthur Hanley was "forgetful" since "he was interviewed twenty years after Stevens' death."

=== Voltaire ===
The accounts of Voltaire's death have been numerous and varying, and it has not been possible to establish the details of what precisely occurred. His enemies related that he repented and accepted the last rites from a Catholic priest, or conversely that he died in agony of body and soul, while his adherents told of his defiance to his last breath.

=== George Washington ===
After U.S. President George Washington died in 1799, rumors spread among his slaves that he was baptized Catholic on his deathbed. This story was orally passed down in African-American communities into the 20th century, as well as among early Maryland Jesuits. The Denver Register printed two pieces, in 1952 and 1957, discussing the possibility of this rumor, including the fact that an official inventory of Washington's personal belongings at the time of his death included one likeness of the Virgin Mary (an item unlikely to have been held by a Protestant). However, no definitive evidence has ever been found of a conversion, nor did any testimony from those close to Washington, including the Catholic Archbishop John Carroll, ever mention this occurring.

== See also ==
- Deathbed confession
- Björn Ironside
- Germaine de Staël
- Robert Stephen Hawker
- Bobby Jones (golfer)
- Shigeru Yoshida
- Mortimer J. Adler
- John von Neumann
- Kenneth Clark
- Alistair McAlpine, Baron McAlpine of West Green
- Henry Bennet, 1st Earl of Arlington
