= Sala del Concistoro =

Coordinates: 41°54′13.7″N 012°27′21.5″E

The Sala del Concistoro (Hall of the Consistory) is a large hall on the third loggia of the Apostolic Palace in the Vatican City. The room is in the residential wing of the palace, added by Pope Sixtus V. It was decorated by Pope Clement VIII. Clement's coat of arms feature on the ceiling of the hall.

In the Lives of the Artists, Giorgio Vasari describes Gianfrancesco Penni as the painter of large parts of the designs for Raphael's tapestries in the Sala del Concistoro. Commissioned by Pope Clement VII, the theme of the tapestries is the life of Christ. The tapestries remained unfinished on Raphael's death, and along with tapestries for the Sala del Consistorio were woven in Brussels. The carved and gilded ceiling contains frescos by Cerubino Alberti and Paul Bril.

In February 2013, at a ceremony in Sala del Concistoro to announce the date for the canonisation of three martyrs, Pope Benedict XVI announced his resignation.
