= The Baptism of Constantine =

Fresco by assistants of Raphael

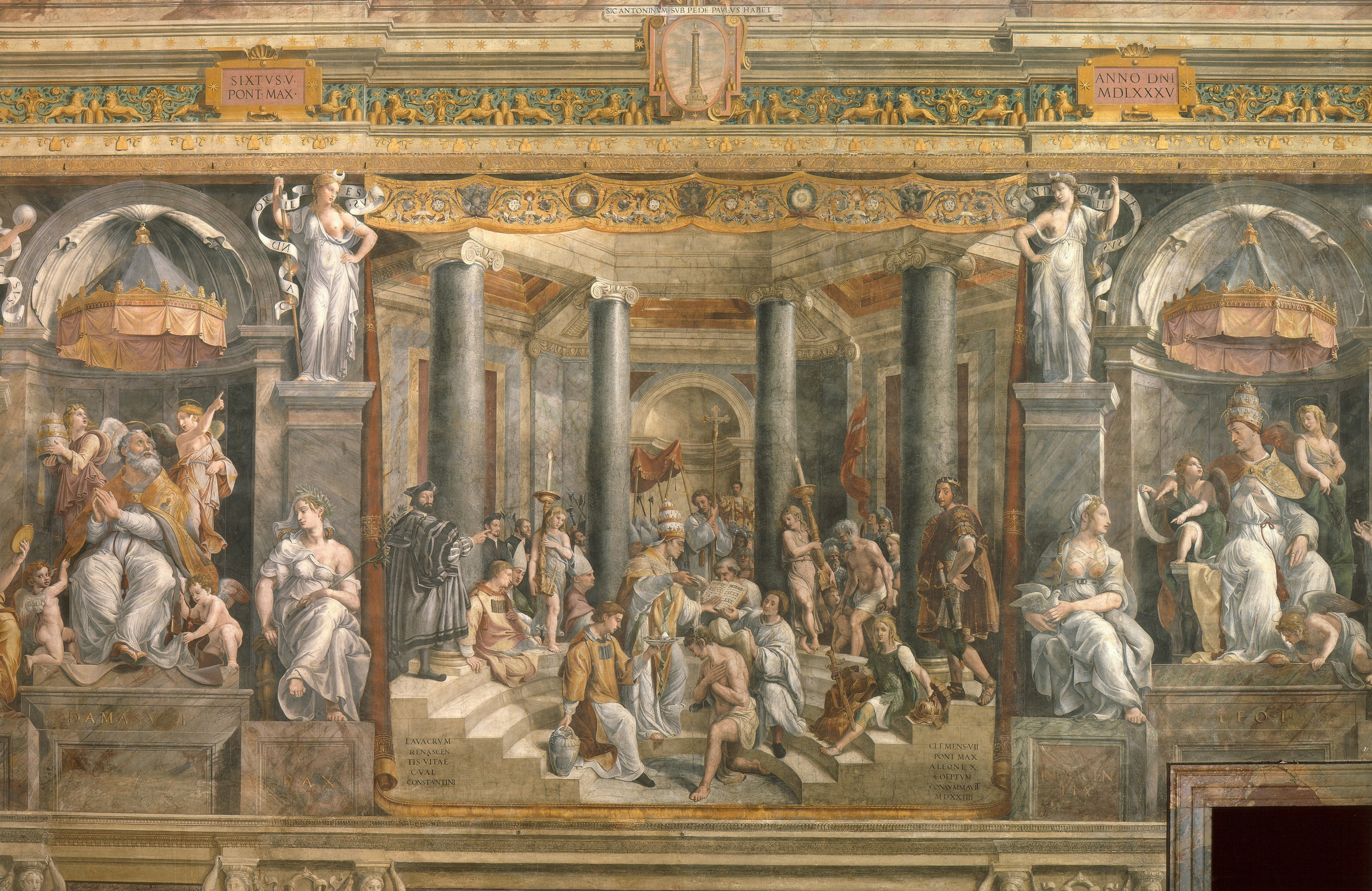
- Artist: Gianfrancesco Penni
- Year: 1517-1524
- Type: Fresco
- Location: Apostolic Palace, Vatican Museums; Vatican City

The Baptism of Constantine is a painting by assistants of the Italian Renaissance artist Raphael. It was most likely painted by Gianfrancesco Penni, between 1517 and 1524.

After the master's death in 1520, Penni worked together with other members of Raphael's workshop to finish the commission to decorate with frescoes the rooms that are now known as the Stanze di Raffaello, in the Apostolic Palace in the Vatican. The Baptism of Constantine is located in the Sala di Costantino ("Hall of Constantine"). In the painting the Emperor Constantine the Great is depicted kneeling down to receive the sacrament from Pope Sylvester I in the Baptistery of the St John Lateran. The painter has given Sylvester the traits of Clement VII, the Pope who had ordered the frescoes to be finished, after the work was interrupted during the papacy of Adrian VI.

While attempting the control and serenity typical of the High Renaissance, the crowded scene demonstrates the Mannerist tendency towards complexity and discordance.
