= Raphael Rooms =

Rooms in the Vatican frescoed by Raphael

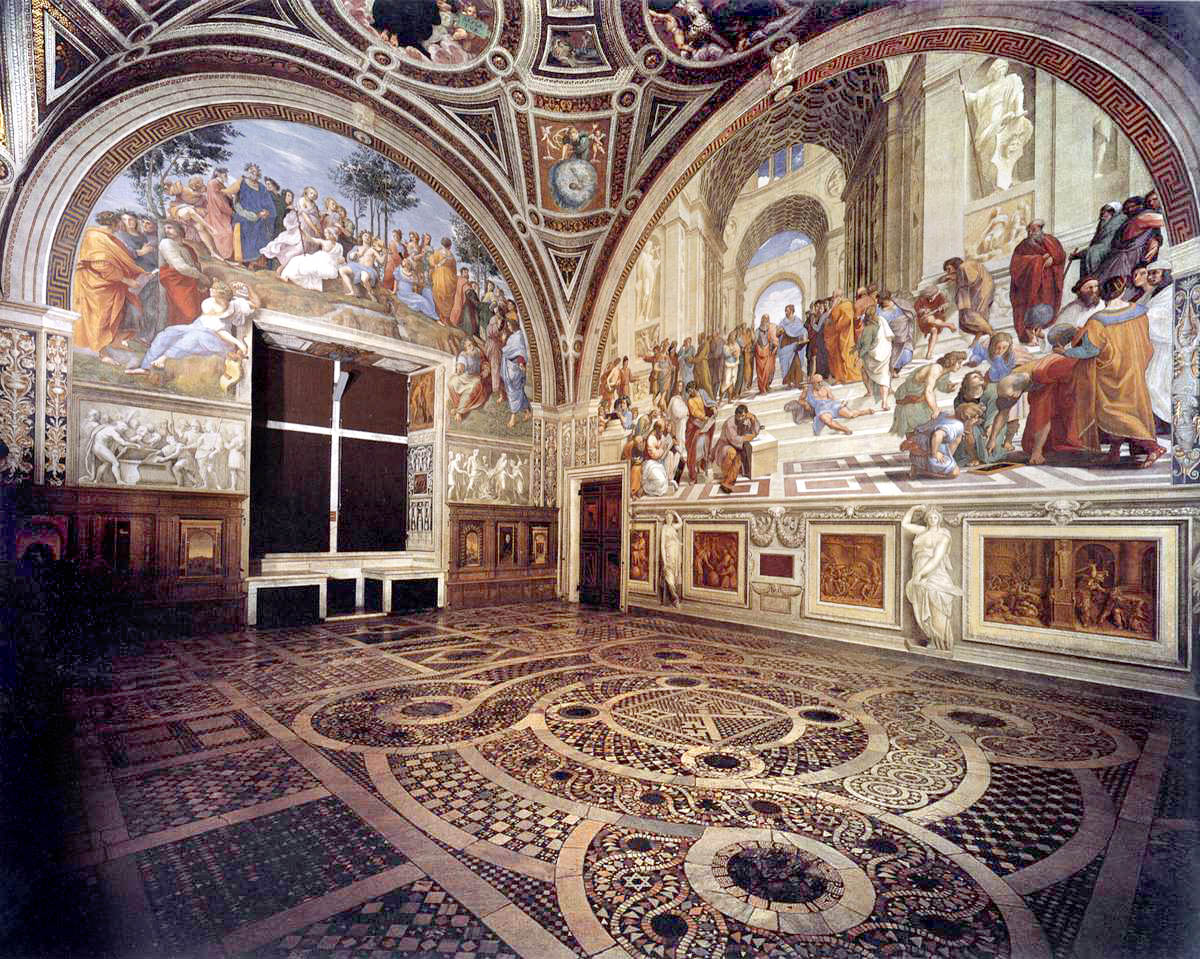
- The Stanza della Segnatura
- Click on the map for a fullscreen view
- Artist: Raphael
- Location: Apostolic Palace, part of Vatican Museums, Rome; 41°54′13″N 12°27′23″E

The four Raphael Rooms (Italian: Stanze di Raffaello) form a suite of reception rooms in the Apostolic Palace, now part of the Vatican Museums, in Vatican City. They are famous for their frescoes, painted by Raphael and his workshop. Together with Michelangelo's Sistine Chapel ceiling frescoes, they are the grand fresco sequences that mark the High Renaissance in Rome.

The Stanze, as they are commonly called, were originally intended as a suite of apartments for Pope Julius II. He commissioned Raphael, then a relatively young artist from Urbino, and his studio in 1508 or 1509 to redecorate the existing interiors of the rooms entirely. It was possibly Julius' intent to outshine the apartments of his predecessor (and rival) Pope Alexander VI, as the Stanze are directly above Alexander's Borgia Apartment. They are on the second floor, overlooking the south side of the Belvedere Courtyard.

Running from east to west, as a visitor would have entered the apartment, but not following the sequence in which the Stanze were frescoed, the rooms are the Sala di Costantino ("Hall of Constantine"), the Stanza di Eliodoro ("Room of Heliodorus"), the Stanza della Segnatura ("Room of the Signatura"), and the Stanza dell'Incendio del Borgo ("The Room of the Fire in the Borgo").

After the death of Julius in 1513, with two rooms frescoed, Pope Leo X continued the program. Following Raphael's death in 1520, his assistants Gianfrancesco Penni, Giulio Romano and Raffaellino del Colle finished the project with the frescoes in the Sala di Costantino.

== Scheme ==
The scheme of the works is as follows:

Room of the Signatura	Room of Heliodorus	Room of the Fire in the Borgo	Hall of Constantine
General view (I)
General view (II)
East wall
The School of Athens	The Expulsion of Heliodorus from the Temple	Battle of Ostia	The Vision of the Cross
South wall
Cardinal and Theological Virtues	The Mass at Bolsena	The Fire in the Borgo	The Battle of the Milvian Bridge
West wall
Disputation of the Holy Sacrament	The Meeting of Leo the Great and Attila	The Coronation of Charlemagne	The Baptism of Constantine
North wall
The Parnassus	Liberation of Saint Peter	The Oath of Leo III	The Donation of Constantine
Ceiling

== Sala di Costantino ==
The largest of the twelve rooms is the Sala di Costantino ("Hall of Constantine"). Its paintings were not begun until Pope Julius and, indeed Raphael himself, had died. The room is dedicated to the victory of Christianity over paganism. Its frescoes represent this struggle from the life of the Roman Emperor Constantine, and are the work of Giulio Romano, Gianfrancesco Penni and Raffaellino del Colle. Because they are not by the master himself, the frescos are less famous than works in the neighboring rooms. Continuing a long tradition of flattery, Raphael's assistants gave the features of the current pontiff, Clement VII, to Pope Sylvester in the paintings.

=== The Vision of the Cross ===
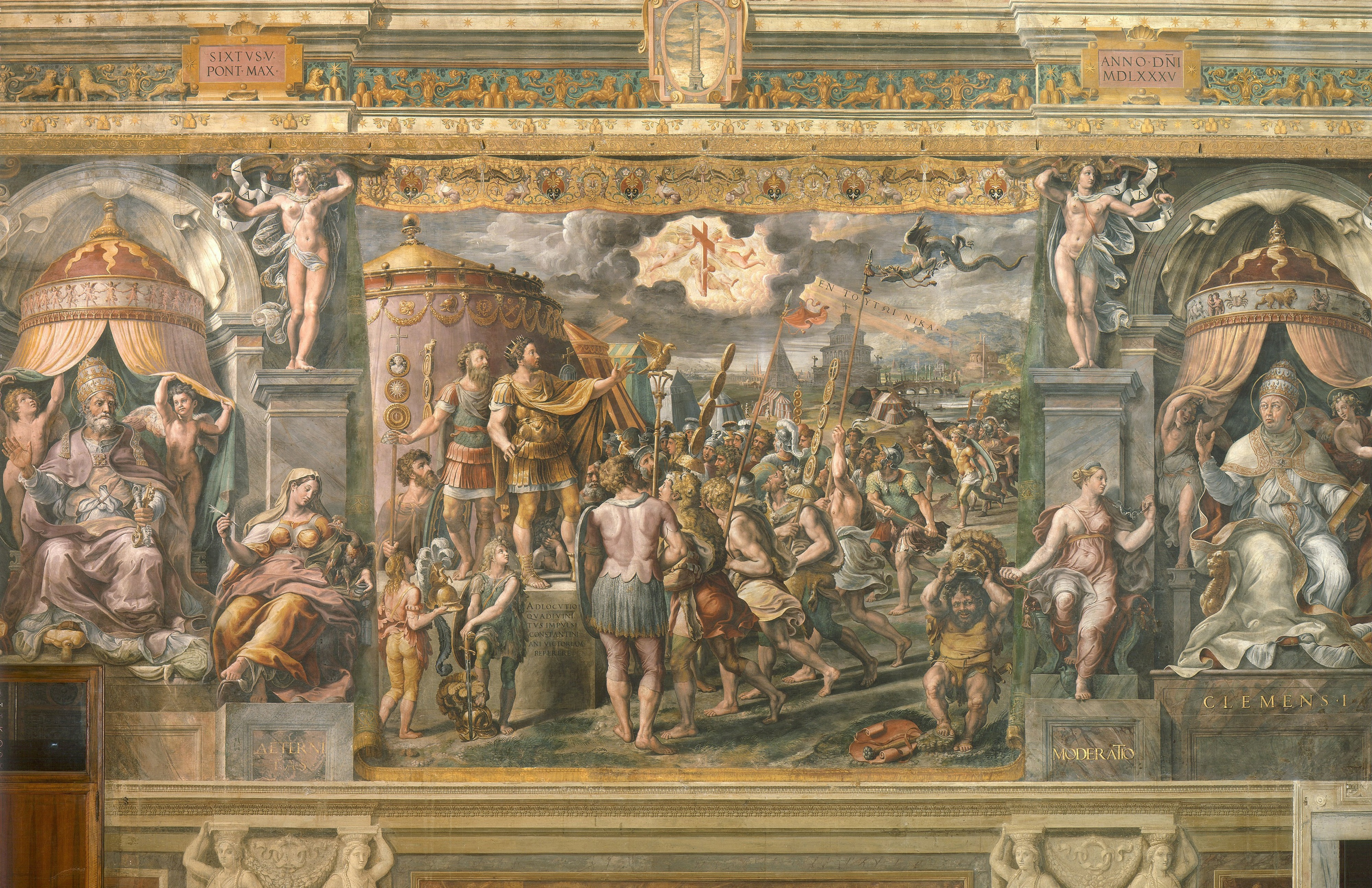
The Vision of the Cross, 1520–1524

The fresco of The Vision of the Cross depicts the legendary story of a great cross appearing to Constantine as he marched to confront his rival Maxentius. The vision in the sky is painted with the words in Greek "Εν τούτω νίκα" ("By this, conquer", better known as the Latin In hoc signo vinces) written next to it.

=== The Battle of Milvian Bridge ===
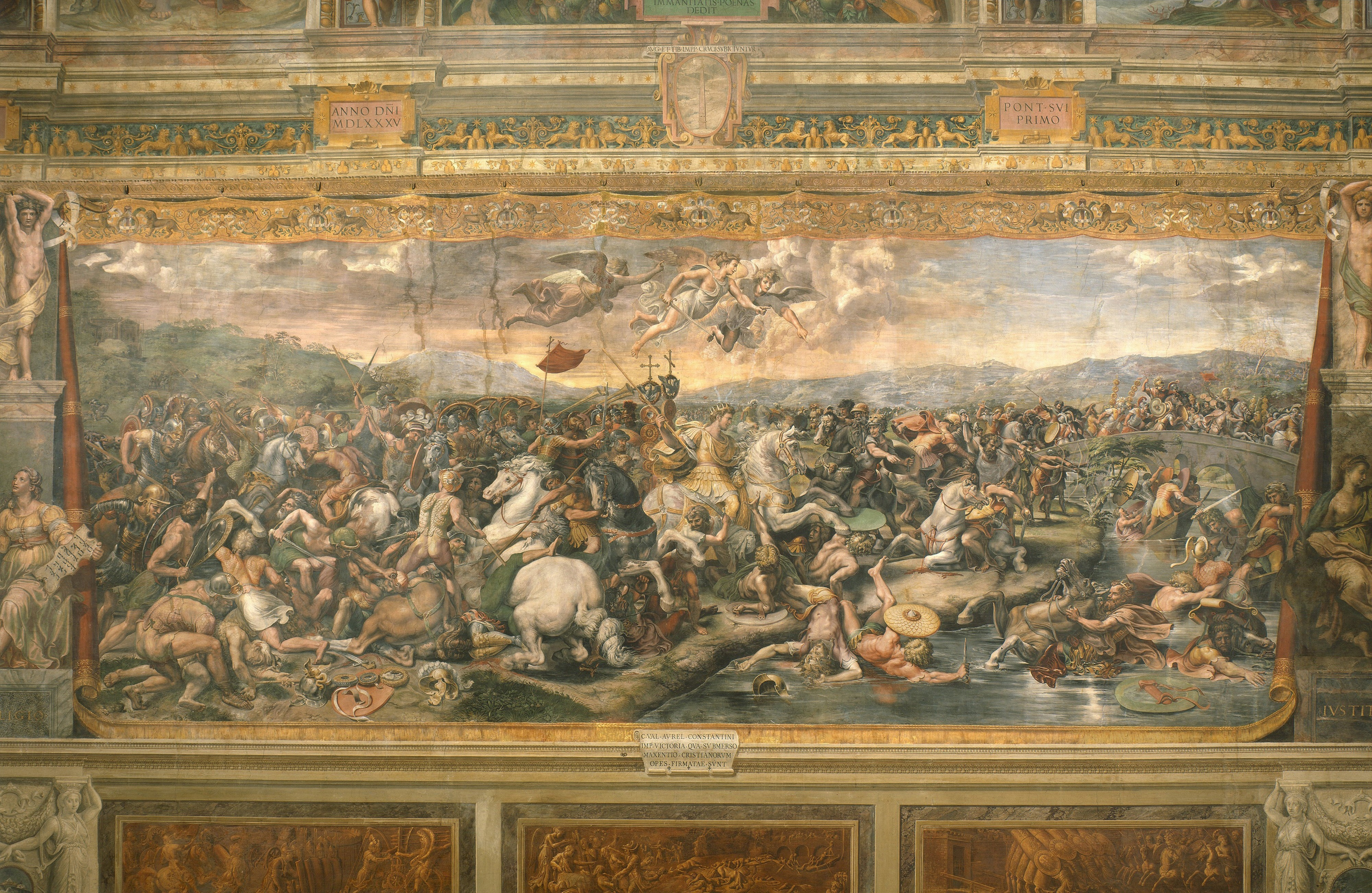
The Battle of Milvian Bridge, 1520-1524

The Battle of Milvian Bridge shows the battle that took place on October 28, 312, following Constantine's vision.

=== The Baptism of Constantine ===
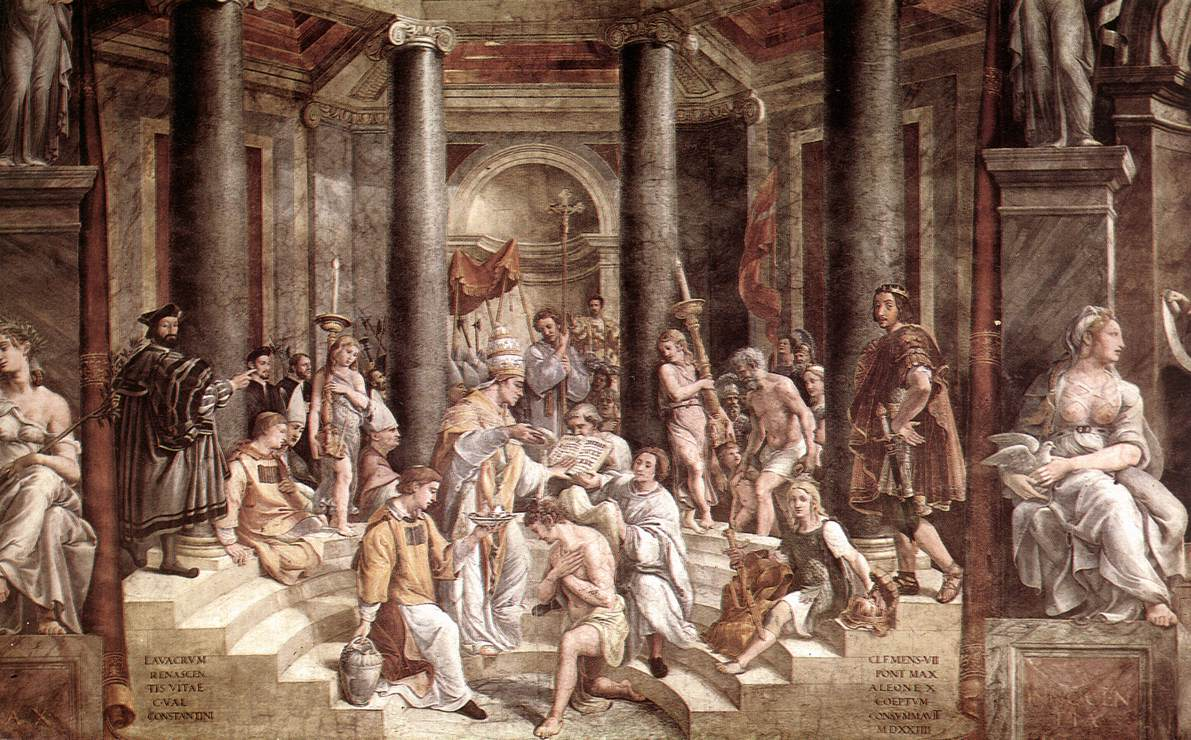
The Baptism of Constantine, 1517–1524

The third painting in the sequence, The Baptism of Constantine, was most likely painted by Gianfrancesco Penni, and shows the emperor being baptised by Pope Sylvester I in the Lateran Baptistery at Rome. This follows the account of Constantine's baptism given in the Acts of Sylvester and the Liber Pontificalis, rather than the alternate deathbed version recounted in Eusebius's Life of Constantine. In The Baptism of Constantine, Pope Sylvester I has the physical features of Pope Clement VII (1523–1534), who ordered the completion of the Raphael Rooms.

=== The Donation of Constantine ===
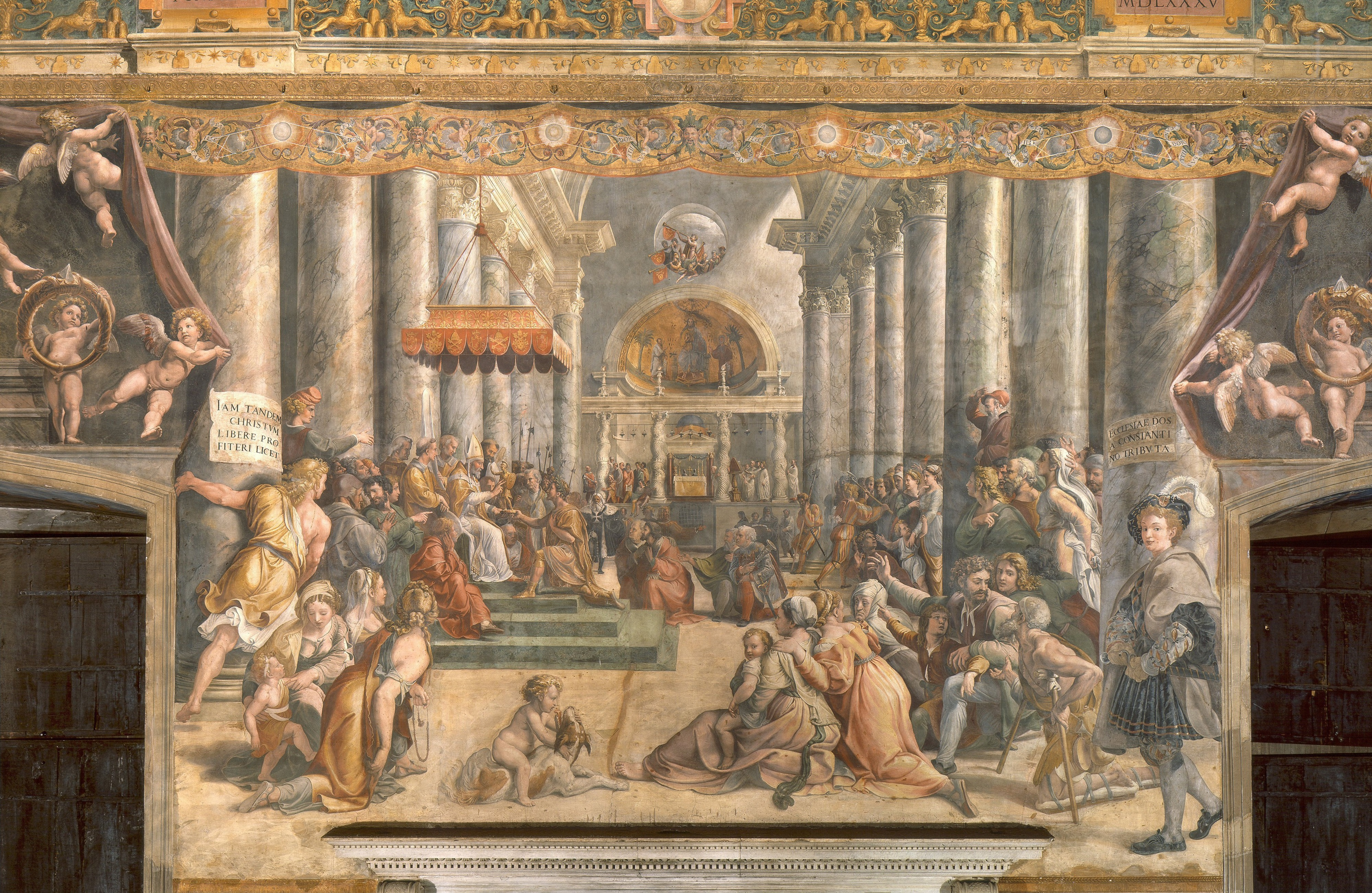
The Donation of Constantine, 1520–1524

The final painting in the sequence, The Donation of Constantine, records an event that supposedly took place shortly after Constantine's baptism, and was inspired by the famous forged documents, incorporated into Gratian's Decretum, granting the Papacy sovereignty over Rome's territorial dominions.

== Stanza di Eliodoro ==
The next room, going from East to West, is the Stanza di Eliodoro ("Room of Heliodorus"). Painted between 1511 and 1514, it takes its name from one of the paintings. The theme of this private chamber – probably an audience room – was the heavenly protection granted by Christ to the Church. The four paintings are: The Expulsion of Heliodorus from the Temple, The Mass at Bolsena, The Meeting of Pope Leo I and Attila, and The Deliverance of Saint Peter from Prison. In the first two of these frescoes, Raphael flatteringly includes his patron, Pope Julius II, as participant or observer; the third, painted after Julius's death, includes a portrait of his successor, Leo X.

Raphael's style changed here from the Stanza della Segnatura. Instead of the static images of the Pope's library, he had dramatic narratives to portray, and his approach was to maximize the frescoes' expressive effects. He represented fewer, larger figures so that their actions and emotions have more direct impact on the viewers, and he used theatrical lighting effects to spotlight certain figures and heighten tension.

=== The Expulsion of Heliodorus from the Temple ===
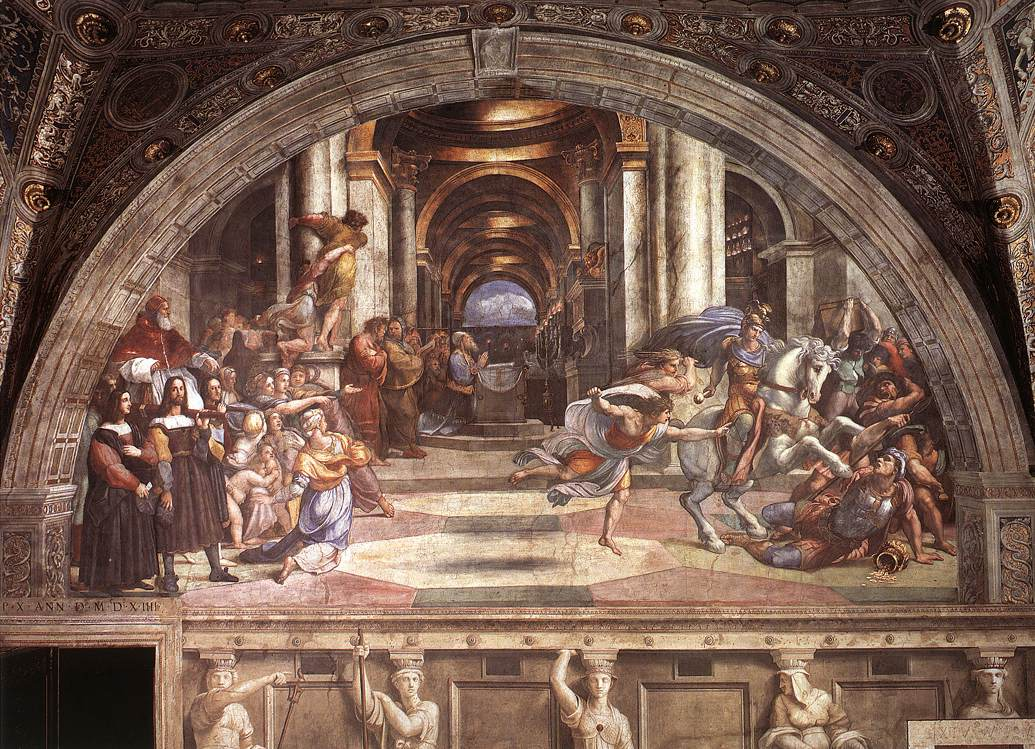
Raphael, The Expulsion of Heliodorus from the Temple, 1511–1513

In The Expulsion of Heliodorus from the Temple Raphael illustrated the biblical episode from II Maccabees (3:21–28) about Heliodorus, who was sent to seize the treasure preserved in the Temple in Jerusalem, but was stopped when the prayer of the priest of the temple was answered by angels who flogged the intruder and an angelic rider who chased him from the temple. The composition is considerably more dramatic than Raphael's earlier frescoes in the Stanza della Segnatura. Although the focal point is the still figure of the priest at prayer, Heliodorus and the angels rush forward into space, threatening to spill out of the painting. At the left Julius II, carried by the Swiss Guard in a chair, witnesses the event. His inclusion here refers to his battles to prevent secular leaders from usurping papal territories.

=== The Mass at Bolsena ===
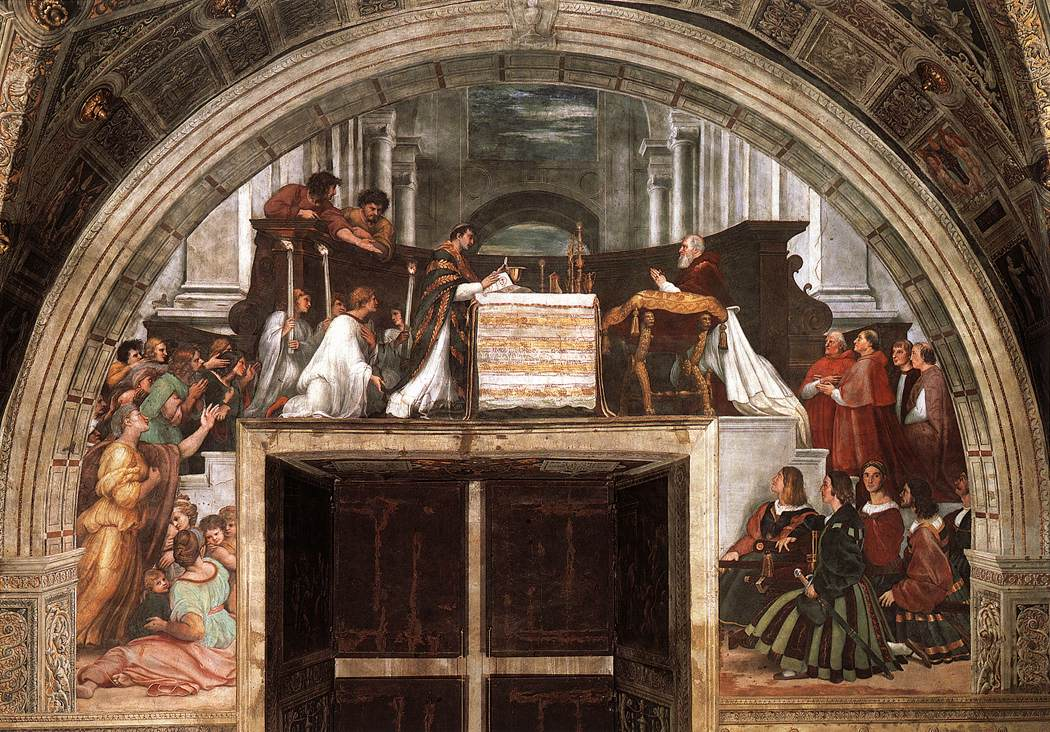
Raphael, The Mass at Bolsena, 1512

The Mass at Bolsena depicts the story of a Bohemian priest who in 1263 ceased to doubt the doctrine of Transubstantiation when he saw the bread begin to bleed during its consecration at Mass. The cloth that was stained by the blood was held as a relic at the nearby town of Orvieto; Julius II had visited Orvieto and prayed over the relic in 1506. The Pope is portrayed as a participant in the Mass and a witness to the miracle; he kneels to the right of the altar, with members of the Curia (also portraits) standing behind him. Raphael distinguishes the "real" thirteenth-century witnesses from those who are contemporaries of the pope by their degree of engagement in the event; the latter concentrate calmly on Julius kneeling at his devotions rather than responding to the miracle.

=== The Meeting of Leo the Great and Attila ===
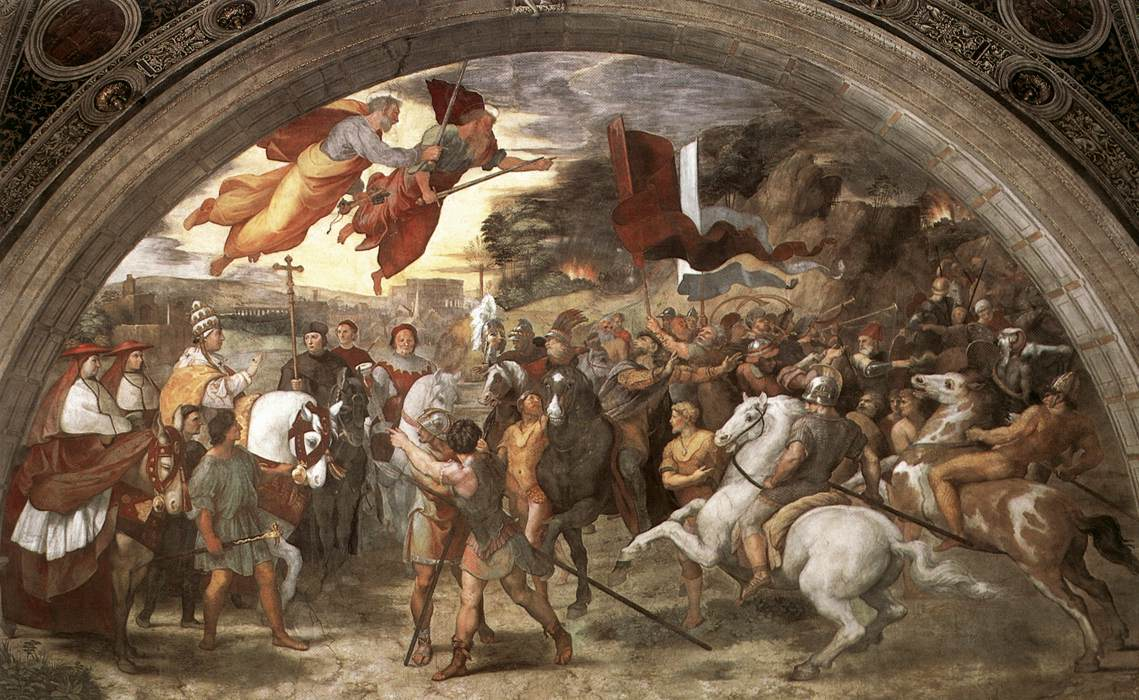
The Meeting of Leo the Great and Attila, 1514

The Meeting of Leo the Great and Attila depicts the storied parley between the Pope and the Hun conqueror, and includes the legendary images of Saint Peter and Saint Paul in the sky bearing swords. A fully developed drawing by Raphael indicates he planned to place the pope – portrayed with Julius's features – in the background; when Leo X became pope – and just happened to choose the name Leo – he must have encouraged the artist to bring the pope front and center and use his own portrait.

=== Deliverance of Saint Peter ===
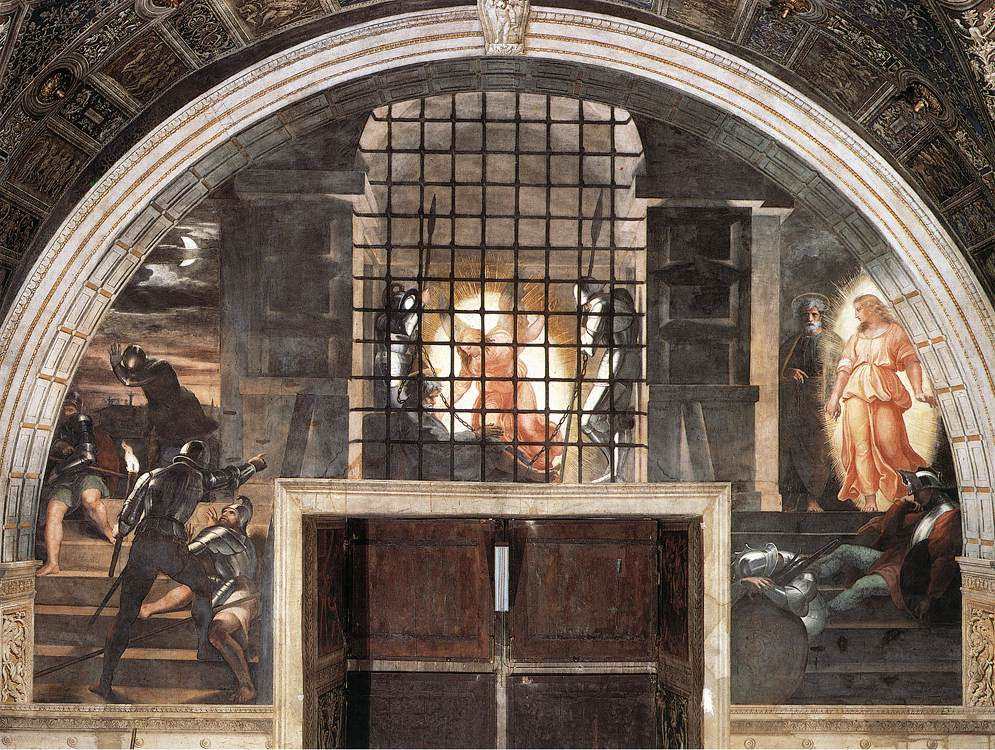
Raphael, Deliverance of Saint Peter, 1514

The Deliverance of Saint Peter shows, in three episodes, how Saint Peter was liberated from prison by an angel, as described in Acts 12. It symbolizes the power of the Vicar of Christ to escape human restraints. Julius II's titular church as cardinal, before he was elevated to the papacy, had been S. Pietro in Vincoli (St. Peter in Chains), so the painting is at once a general reference to the papacy and a specific reference to Julius. The fresco is a study in light: natural moonlight, man-made torchlight, and God-provided angel light. It is the latter, of course, that outshines the others.

== Stanza della Segnatura ==
The Stanza della segnatura ("Room of the Signatura") was the first to be decorated by Raphael's frescoes. It was the study housing the library of Julius II, in which the Signatura of Grace tribunal was originally located. The artist's concept brings into harmony the spirits of Antiquity and Christianity and reflects the contents of the pope's library with themes of theology, philosophy, jurisprudence, and the poetic arts, represented in tondi above the lunettes of the walls. The theme of this room is worldly and spiritual wisdom and the harmony which Renaissance humanists perceived between Christian teaching and Greek philosophy. The theme of wisdom is appropriate as this room was the council chamber for the Apostolic Signatura, where most of the important papal documents were signed and sealed.

=== Disputation of the Holy Sacrament ===
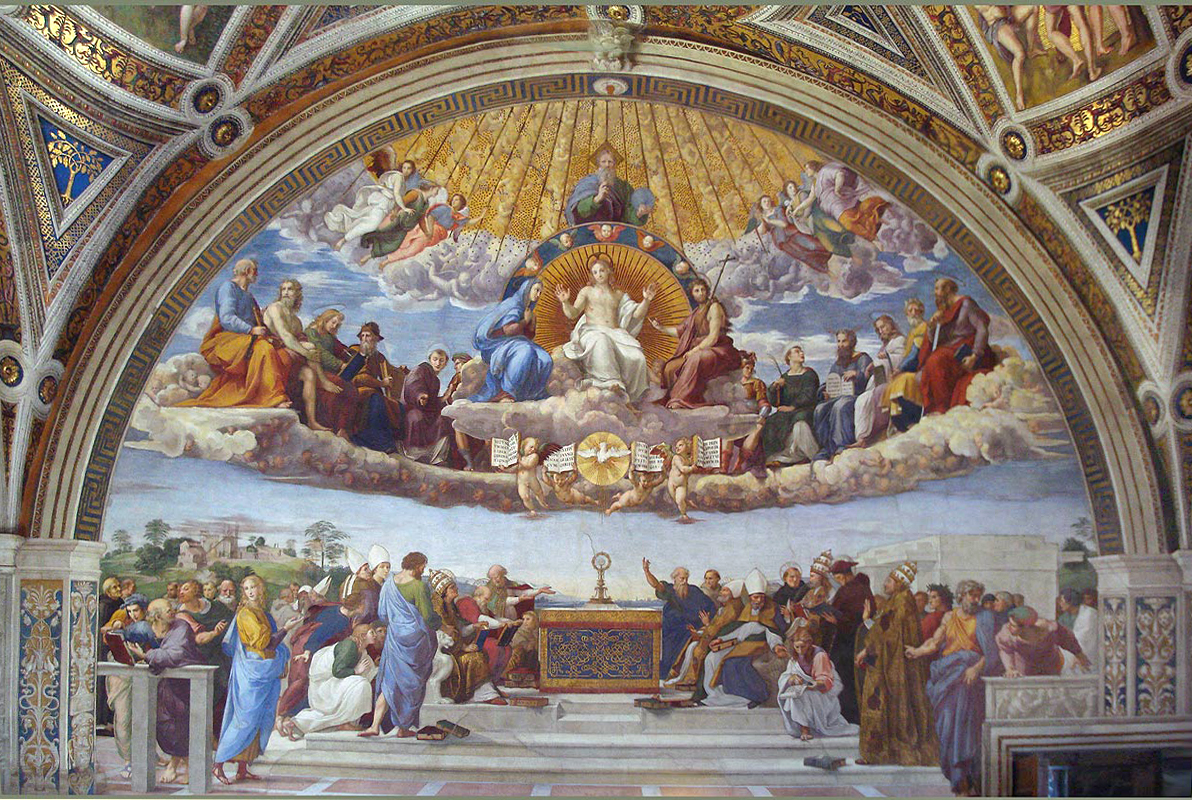
Raphael, Disputation of the Holy Sacrament, 1509-1510

The first composition Raphael executed between 1509 and 1510 was the Disputation of the Holy Sacrament, the traditional name for what is really an Adoration of the Sacrament. In the painting, Raphael created an image of the church, which is presented as spanning both heaven and earth.

=== The Parnassus ===
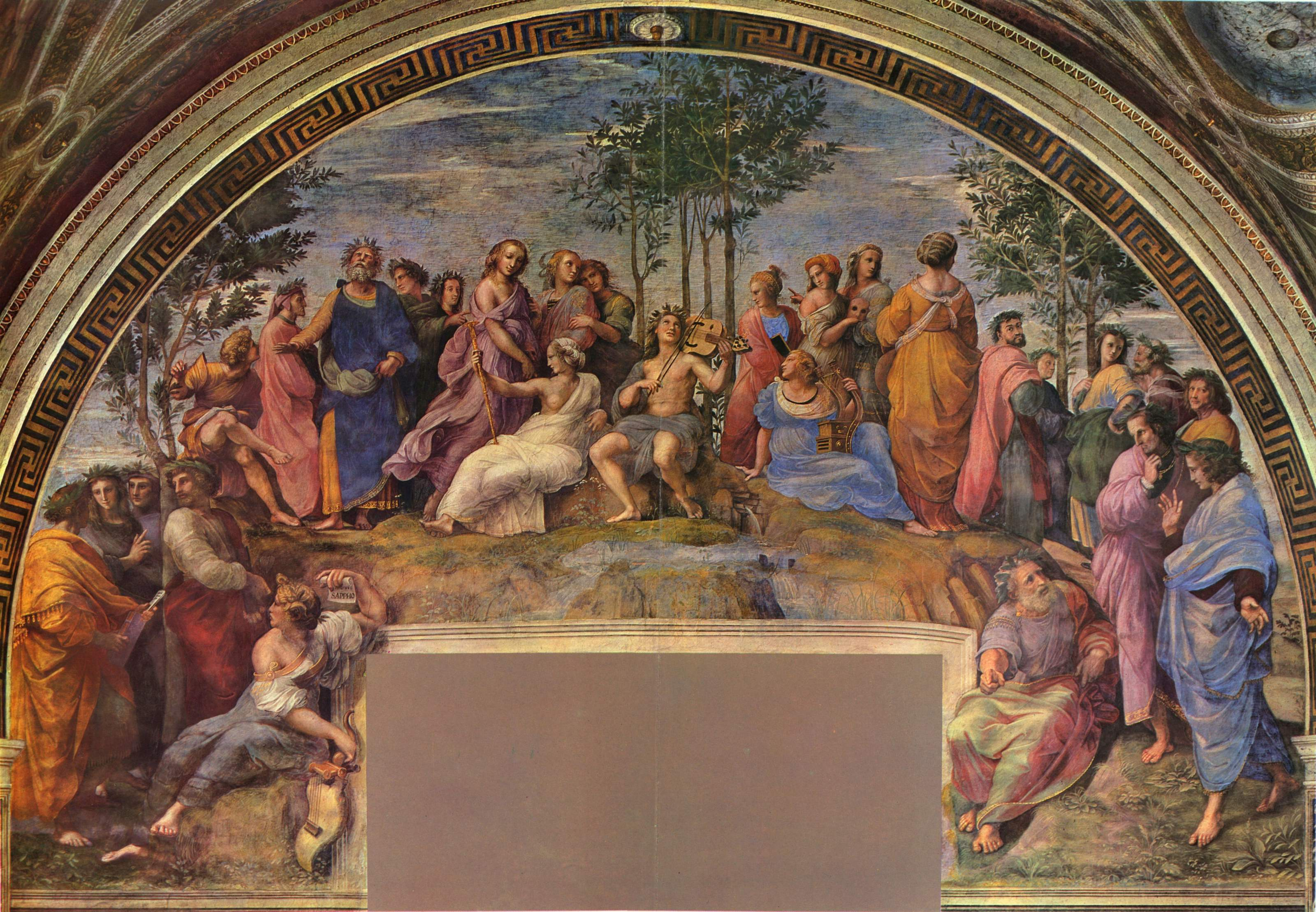
Raphael, The Parnassus, 1509-1511

Raphael completed the second composition between 1509 and 1511. It represents The Parnassus, the dwelling place of the god Apollo and the Muses and the home of poetry, according to classical myth. In the fresco Apollo and the Muses are surrounded by poets from antiquity and Raphael's own time.

=== The School of Athens ===
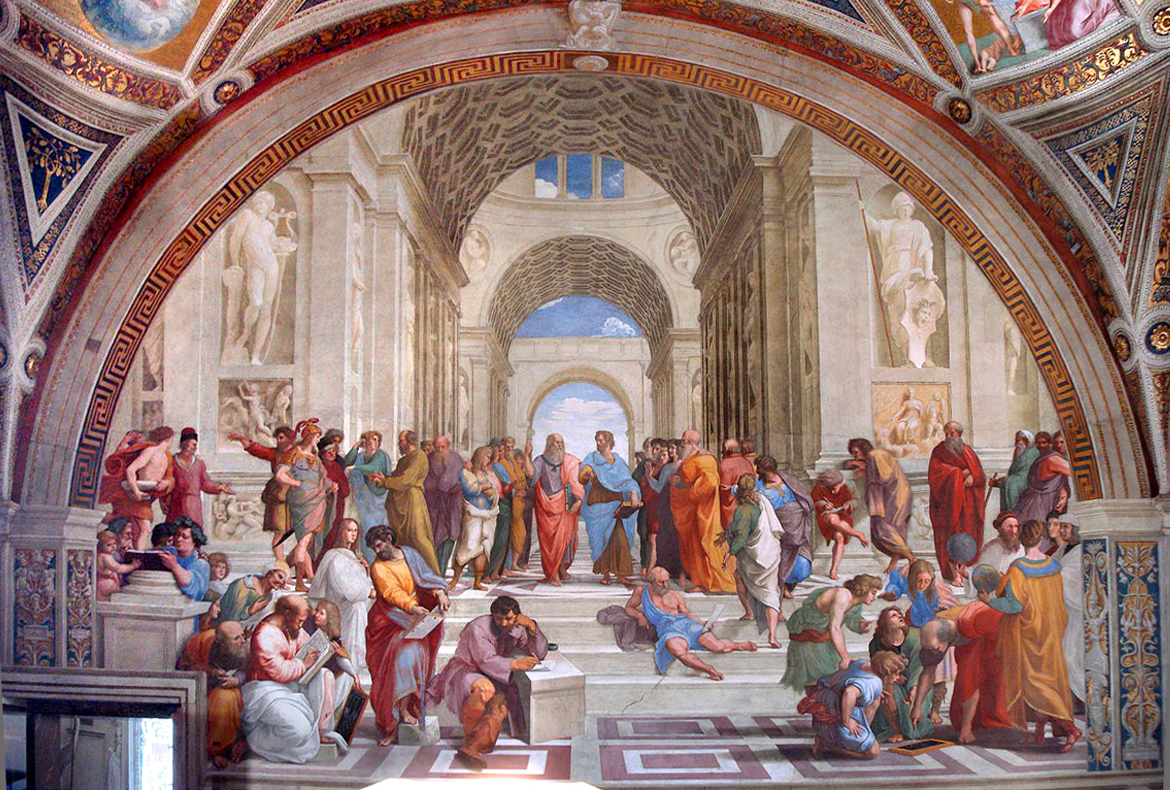
Raphael, The School of Athens, 1509-1511

Between 1509 and 1511, Raphael also completed another work on the wall opposite the Disputa. This third painting, entitled The School of Athens, represents the degrees of knowledge or the truth acquired through reason. The fresco's position as well as the philosophers' walk in direction of the Holy Sacrament on the opposite wall suggested the interpretation of the whole room as the movement from the classical philosophy to the true religion and from the pre-Christian world to Christianity. It was meant to reside over the philosophical section of Pope Julius II's library. It is perhaps Raphael's most famous fresco.

=== The Cardinal Virtues ===
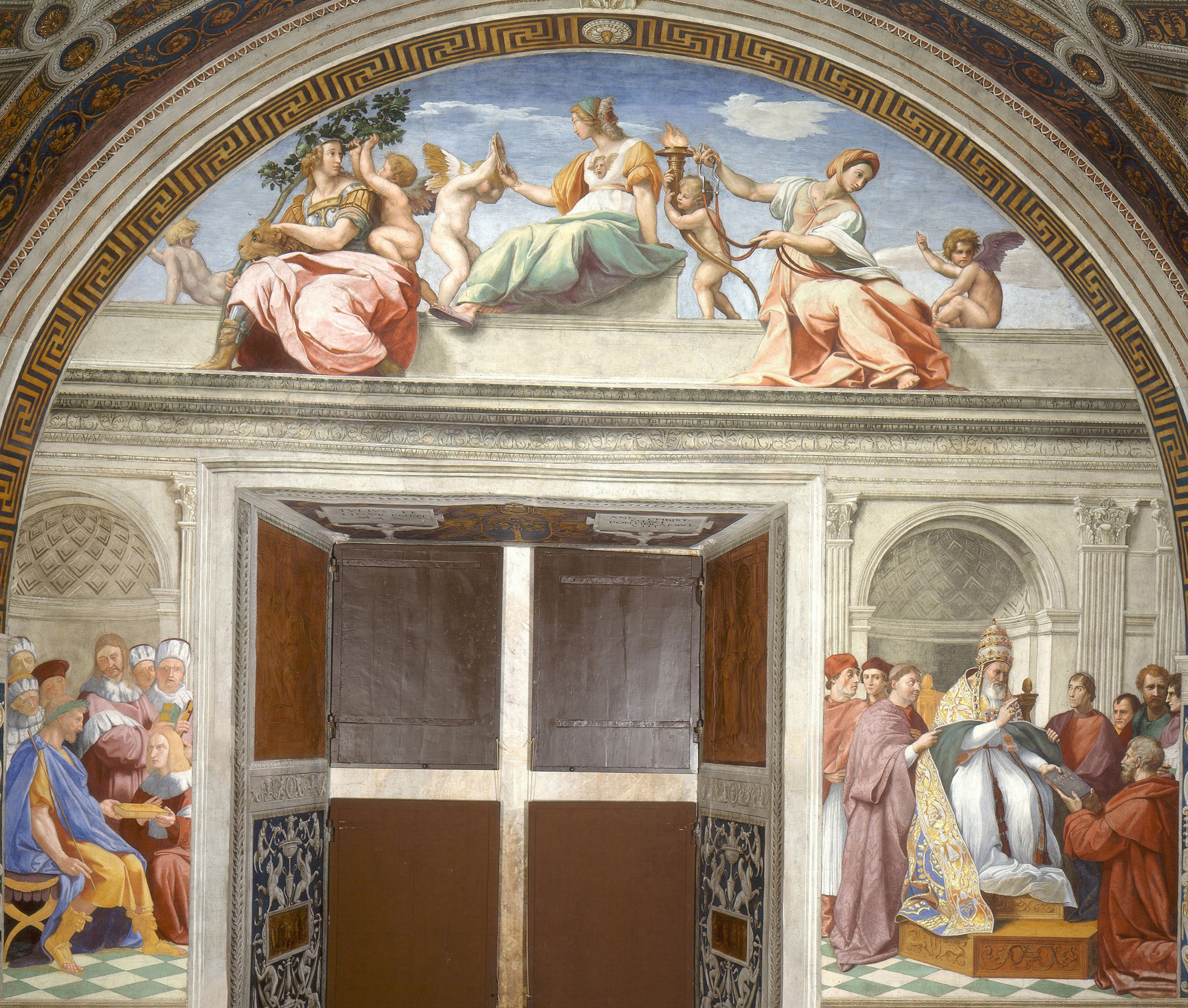
Raphael, The Cardinal Virtues, 1511

The two scenes on the fourth wall, executed by the workshop, and the lunette above it, containing the Cardinal Virtues, were painted in 1511. The Cardinal Virtues allegorically presents the virtues of fortitude, prudence and temperance alongside charity, faith, and hope.

== Stanza dell'incendio del Borgo ==
The Stanza dell'incendio del Borgo was named for the Fire in the Borgo fresco which depicts Pope Leo IV making the sign of the cross to extinguish a raging fire in the Borgo district of Rome near the Vatican. This room was prepared as a music room for Julius' successor, Leo X. The frescos depict events from the lives of Popes Leo III and Leo IV. The other paintings in the room are The Oath of Leo III, The Coronation of Charlemagne by Leo III, and The Battle of Ostia. Though the Fire in the Borgo was based on Raphael's mature designs it was executed by his assistants, who painted the other three paintings without his guidance.

=== The Oath of Leo III ===
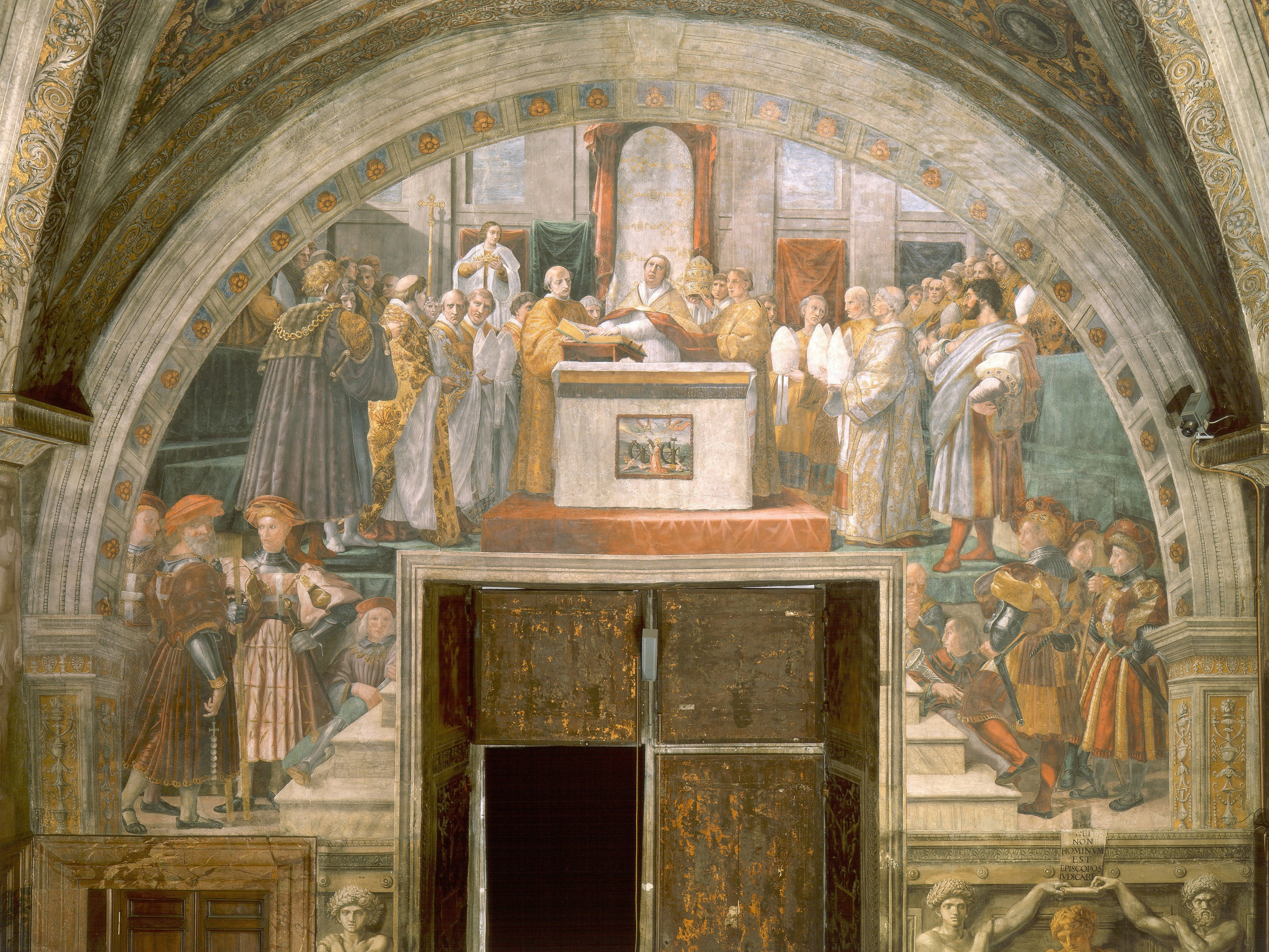
The Oath of Leo III, 1516–1517

On December 23, 800 AD, Pope Leo III took an oath of purgation concerning charges brought against him by the nephews of his predecessor Pope Hadrian I. This event is shown in The Oath of Leo III.

=== The Coronation of Charlemagne ===
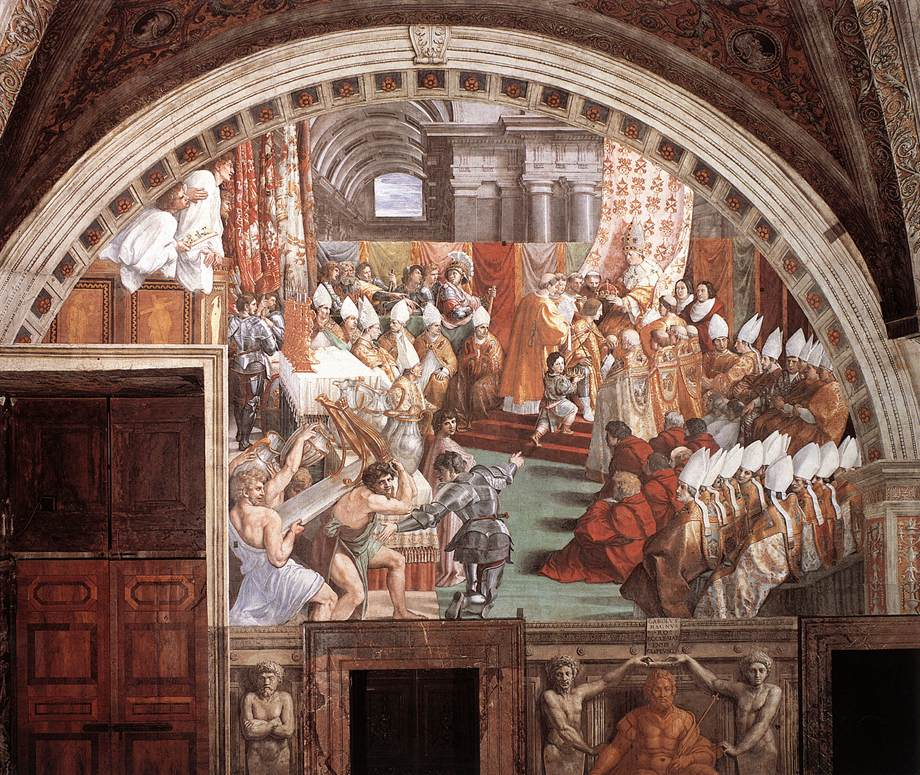
The Coronation of Charlemagne, 1516–1517

The Coronation of Charlemagne shows how Charlemagne was crowned Imperator Romanorum on Christmas Day, 800.

=== Fire in the Borgo ===
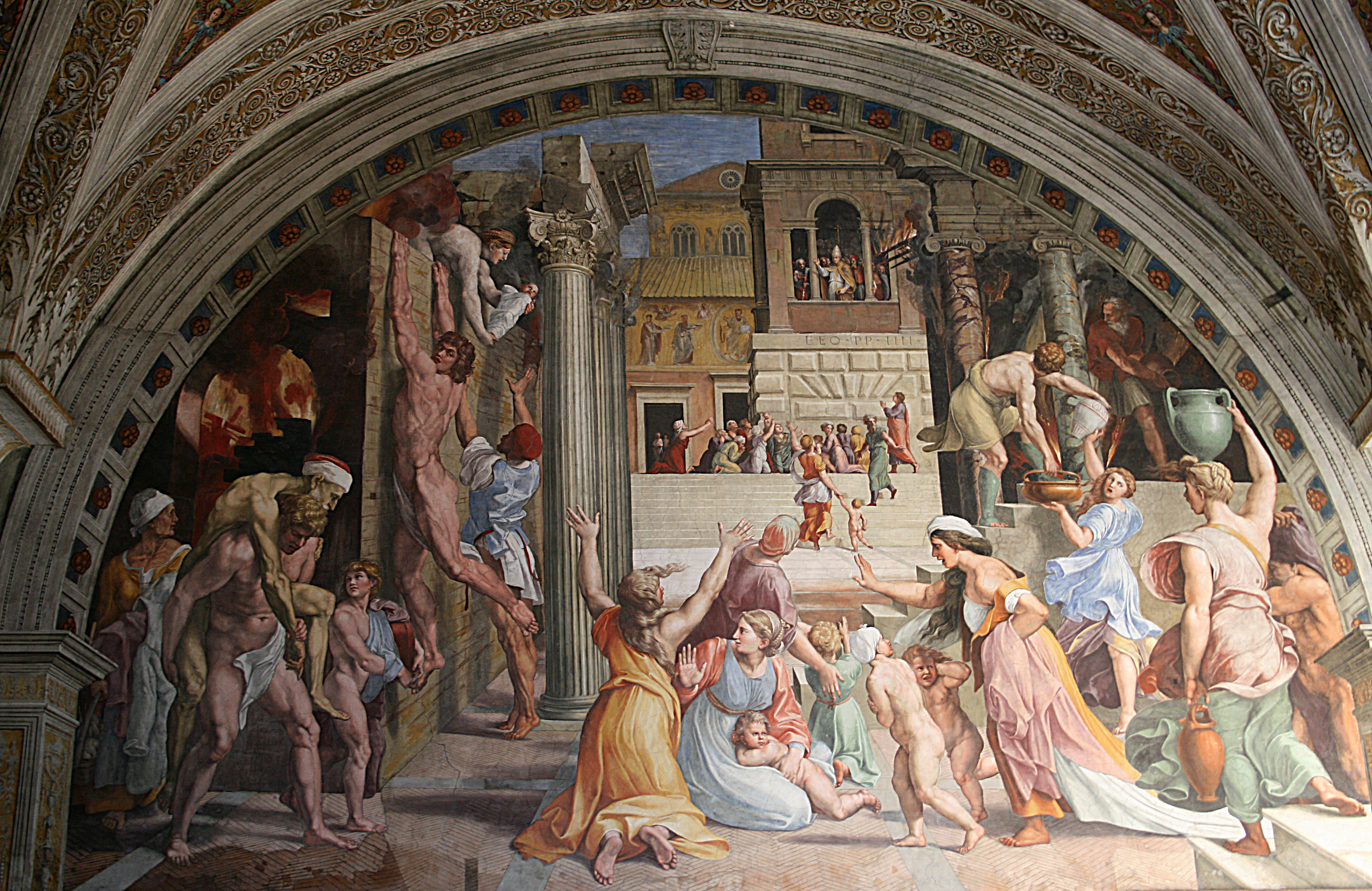
The Fire in the Borgo, 1514–1517

The Fire in the Borgo shows an event that is documented in the Liber Pontificalis: a fire that broke out in the Borgo in Rome in 847. According to the Catholic Church, Pope Leo IV contained the fire with his benediction.

=== The Battle of Ostia ===
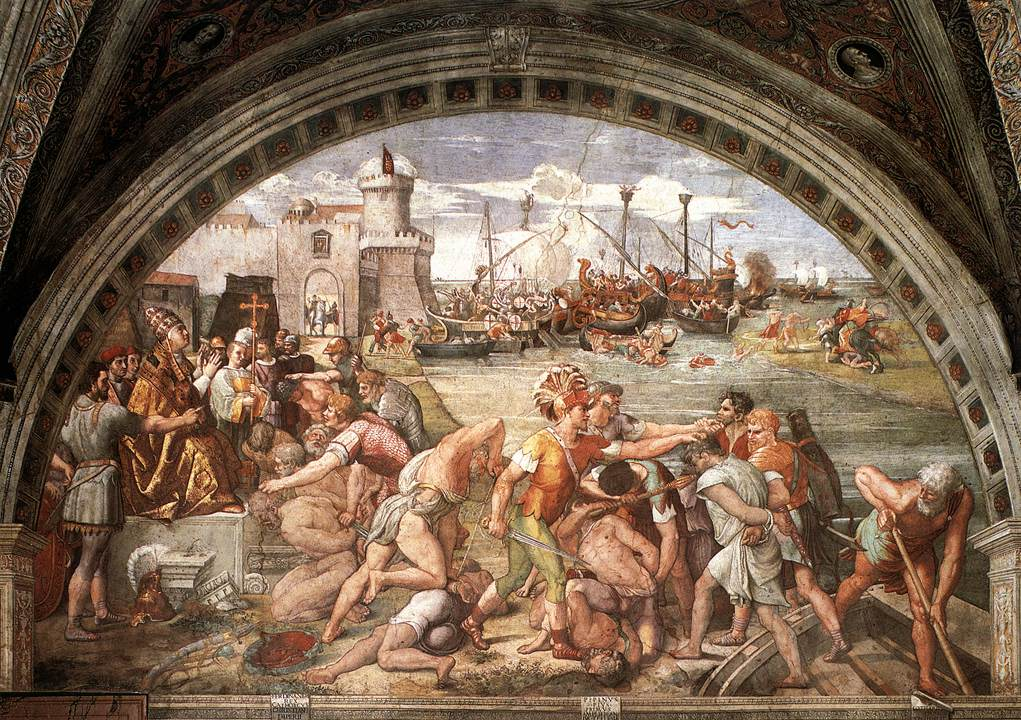
The Battle of Ostia, 1514–1515

The Battle of Ostia was inspired by the naval victory of Leo IV over the Saracens at Ostia in 849.

== See also ==
- Index of Vatican City-related articles
- List of paintings by Raphael

== Notes ==
Preceded by Ecstasy of Saint Teresa	Landmarks of Rome; Raphael Rooms	Succeeded by Sistine Chapel ceiling
