= The Oath of Leo III =

Fresco by the workshop of Raphael

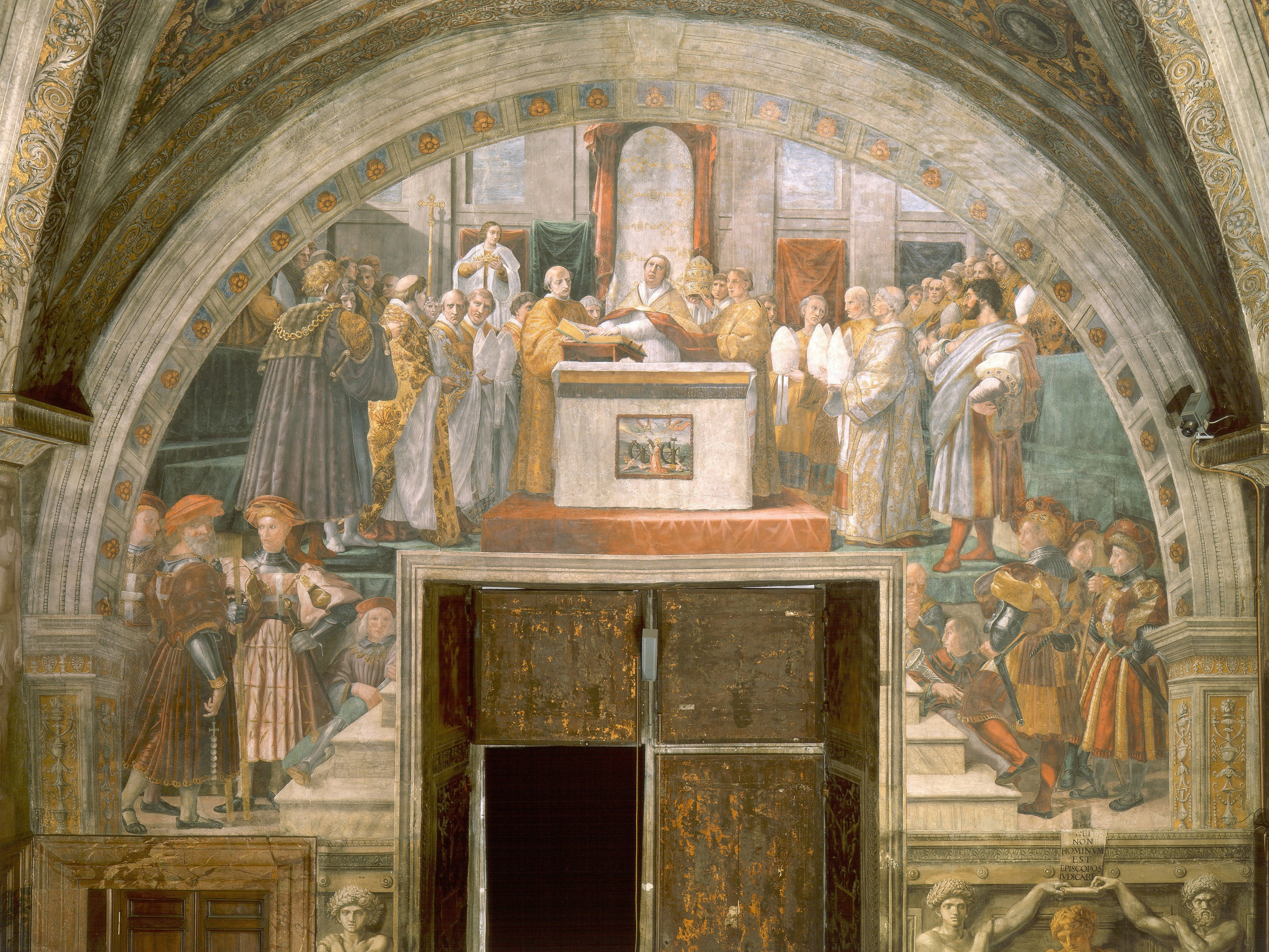
- Artist: Workshop of Raphael
- Year: 1516–1517
- Type: Fresco
- Dimensions: 770 cm (300 in) wide
- Location: Apostolic Palace, Vatican Museums; Vatican City

The Oath of Leo III is a painting by the workshop of the Italian renaissance artist Raphael. The painting was part of Raphael's commission to decorate the rooms that are now known as the Stanze di Raffaello, in the Apostolic Palace in the Vatican. It is located in the room that was named after The Fire in the Borgo, the Stanza dell'incendio del Borgo. In the fresco, Pope Leo III is seen during the trial on December 23 AD 800 during which he was brought face to face with the nephews of his predecessor Pope Hadrian I, who had accused him of misconduct. The assembled bishops declared that they could not judge the pope, after which Leo took an oath of purgation of his own free will.
