= The Expulsion of Heliodorus from the Temple =

Fresco by Raphael

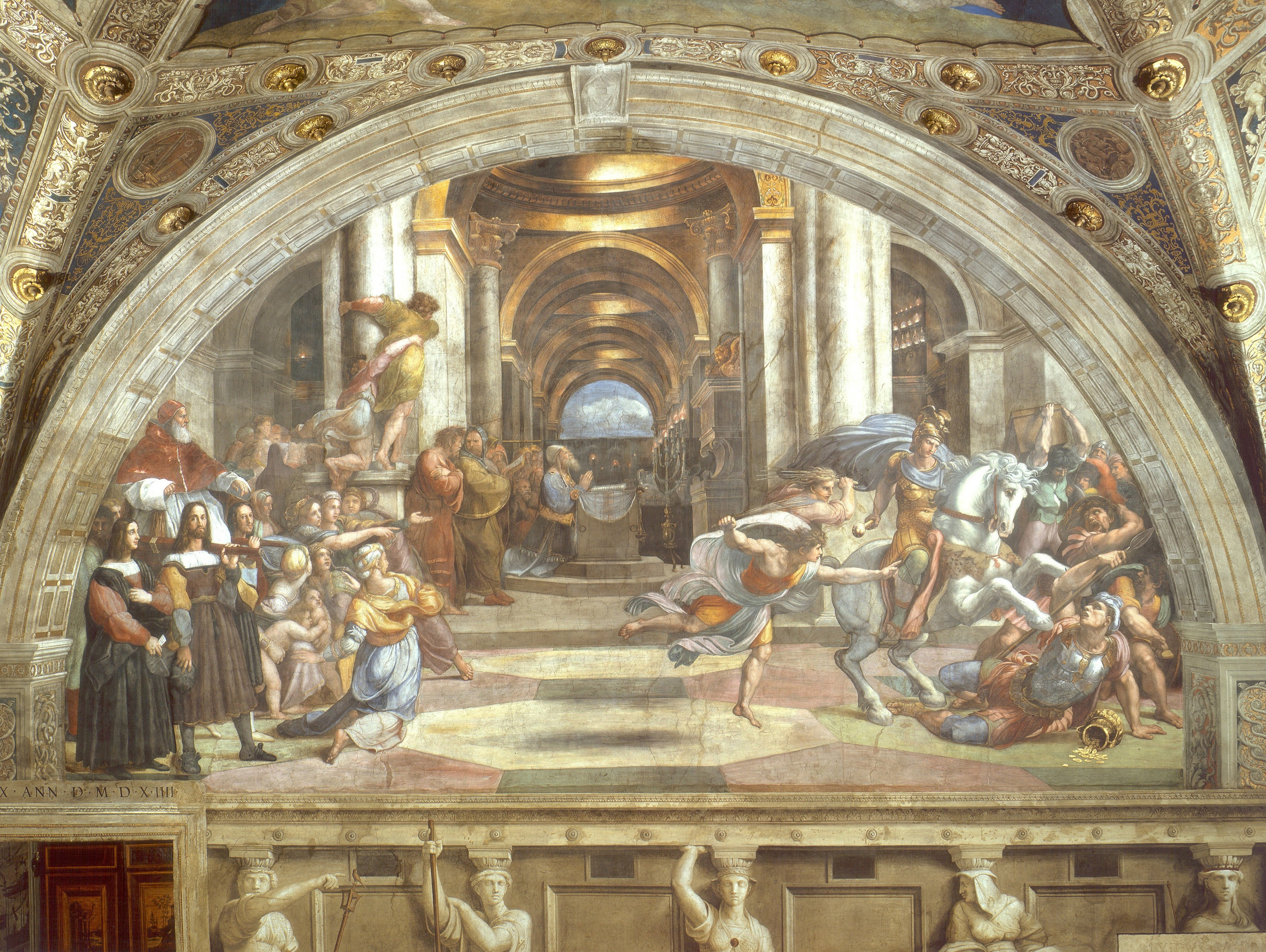
- Artist: Raphael
- Year: 1511–1512
- Type: Fresco
- Dimensions: 750 cm (300 in) wide
- Location: Apostolic Palace, Vatican Museums; Vatican City

The Expulsion of Heliodorus from the Temple is a fresco of the Italian renaissance painter Raphael. It was painted between 1511 and 1512 as part of Raphael's commission to decorate with frescoes the rooms that are now known as the Stanze di Raffaello, in the Apostolic Palace in the Vatican. It is located in the room that takes its name from it, the Stanza di Eliodoro.

The Expulsion of Heliodorus from the Temple illustrates the biblical episode from 2 Maccabees (3:21-28). Heliodorus is ordered by Seleucus IV Philopator, the king of Syria, to seize the treasure preserved in the Temple in Jerusalem. Answering the prayers of the high priest Onias III, God sends a horseman assisted by two youths to drive Heliodorus out.

At the left, Raphael's patron Julius II witnesses the scene from his litter. The money had been reserved for widows and orphans and a priest had seen and prayed and God sent down a horseman to drive him from the temple. The composition is divided into two halves, in the centre is the priest praying and the priest looks much like Julius II. On the right is the horseman fighting Heliodorus. The menorah by the priest in the centre shows that this event, from the Old Testament, occurs in a synagogue. On the left are widows and orphans grouped together and Julius II is being carried on a throne, witnessing this event. While one message of the event is God will not allow you to “steal from the church”, the painting is located in the same stanza as The Mass at Bolsena. Together the events seem to underscore the Counter-Reformation efforts to underscore the sacredness of the services, including sacraments, occurring inside church buildings. The architecture begs comparison with Raphael's earlier fresco masterwork The School of Athens (1509-1511), although the Domes in “The Expulsion of Heliodorus from the Temple” are much richer and are gilded and highly decorated.

The work contains a self-portrait by Raphael, near the far left.

In 1725 the baroque Italian painter Francesco Solimena and 1850 the French romantic artist Eugène Delacroix each created a work based on the same story.

== Gallery ==
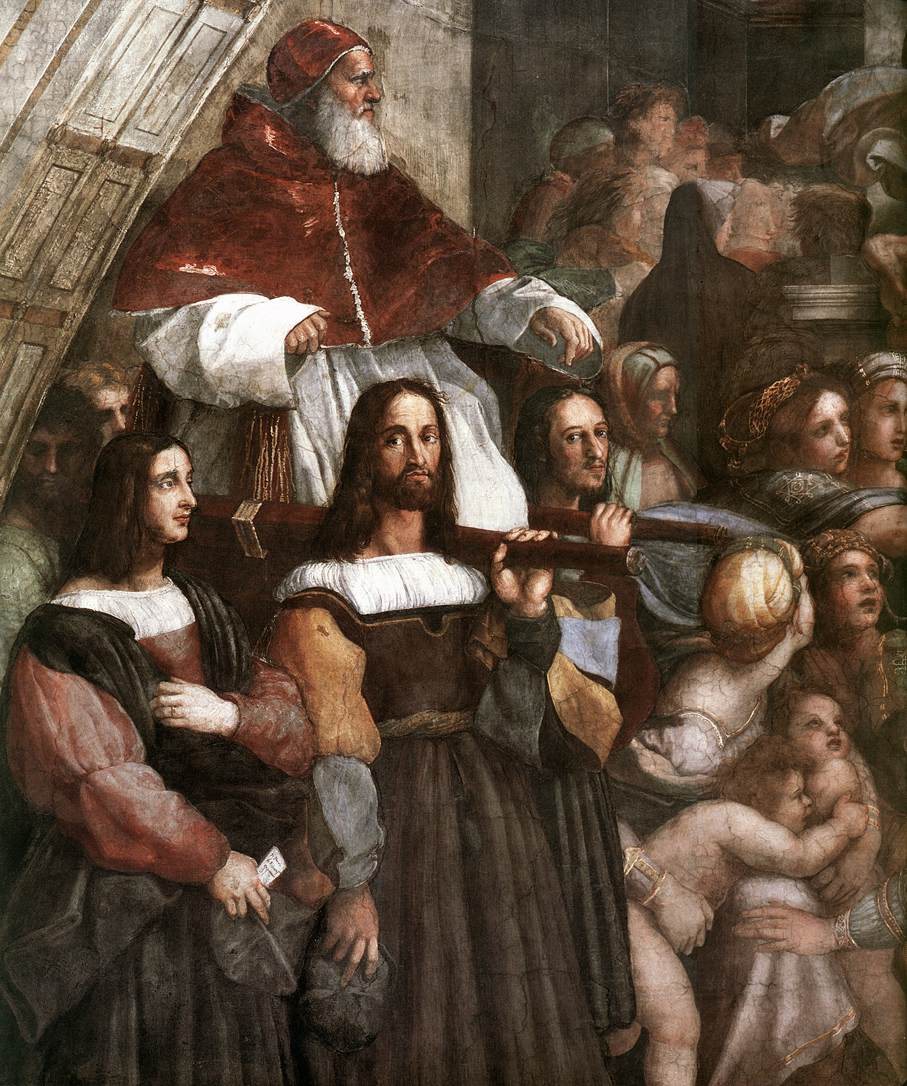

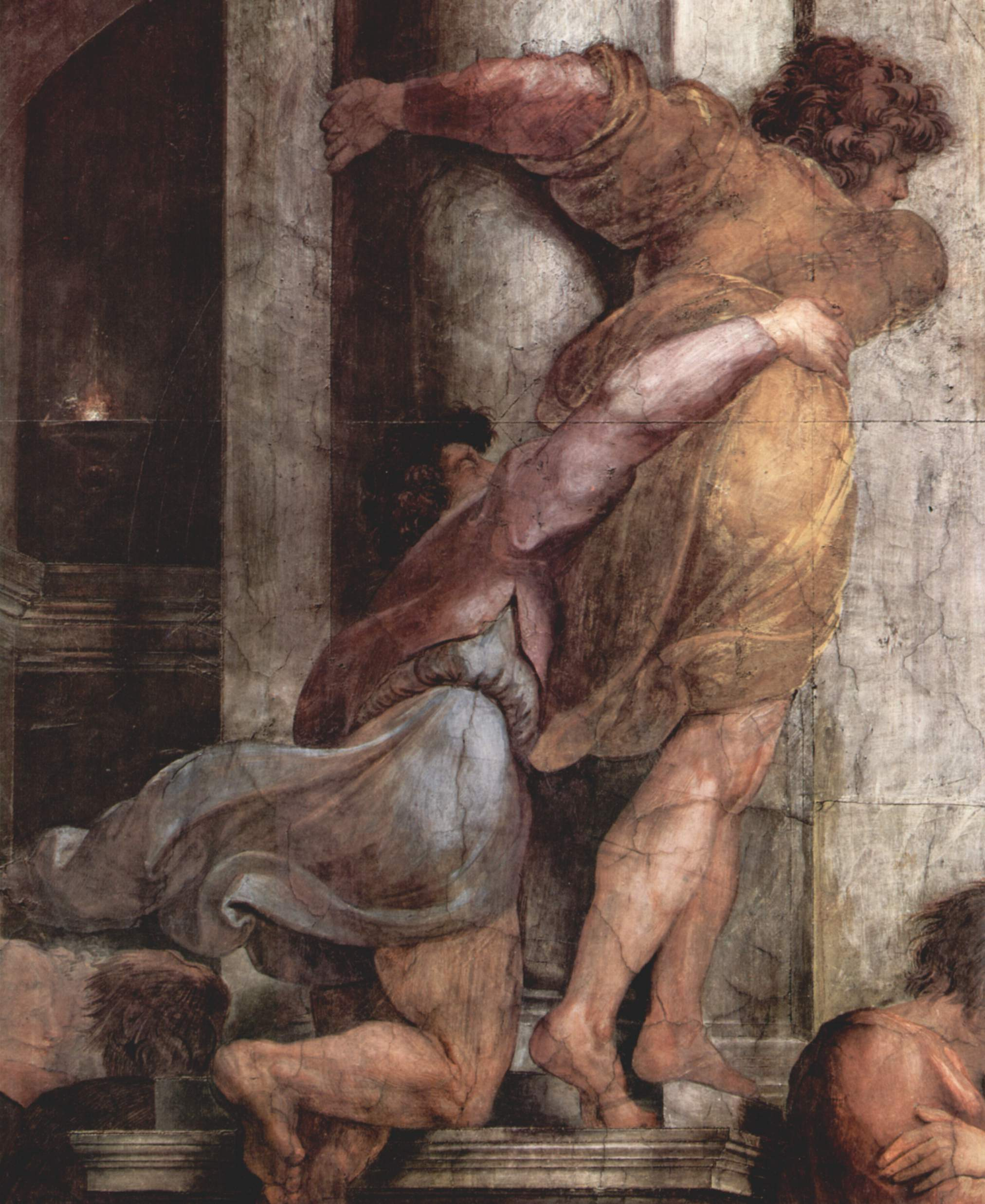

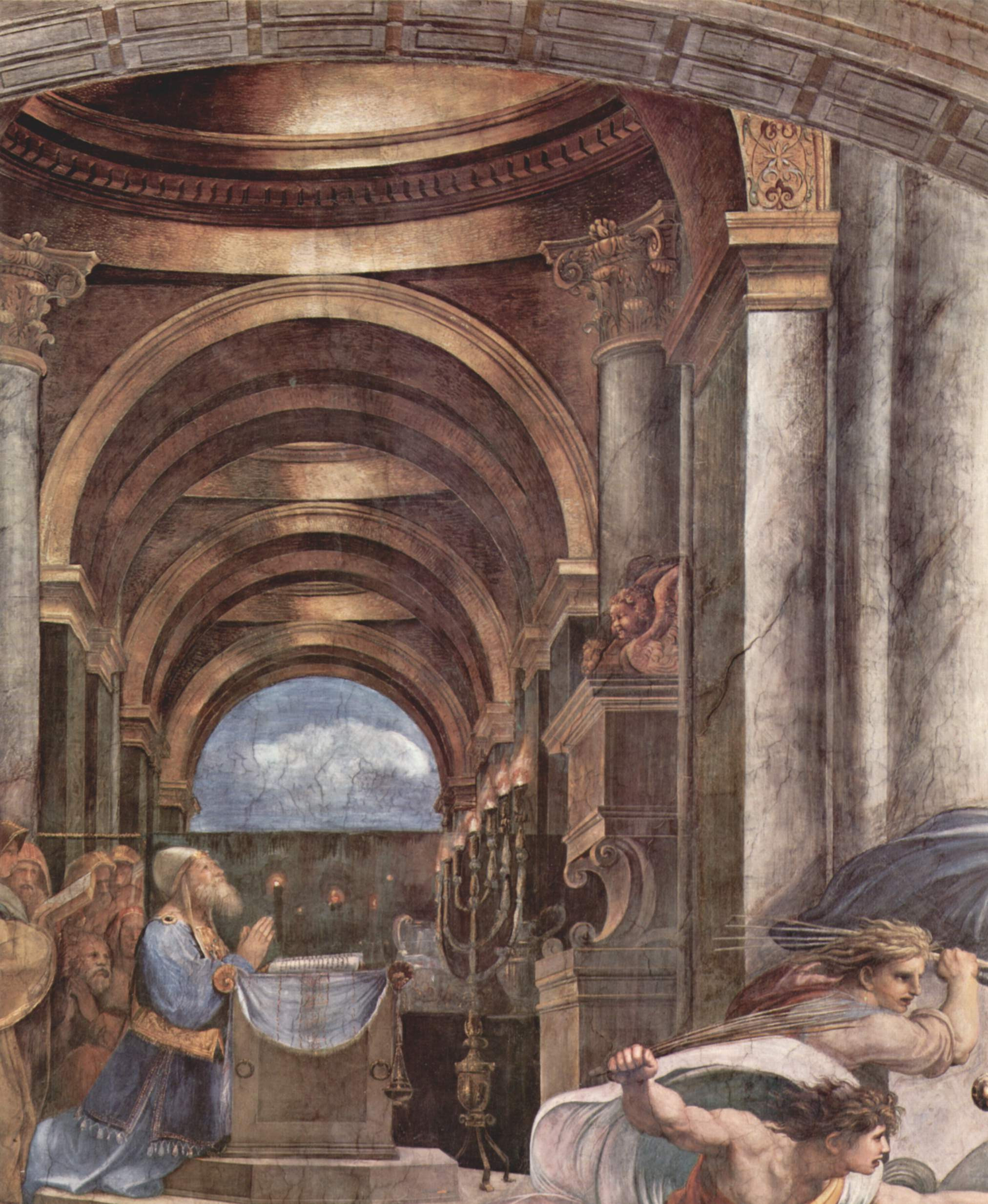

== See also ==
- List of paintings by Raphael
