= The Fire in the Borgo =

Fresco by Raphael

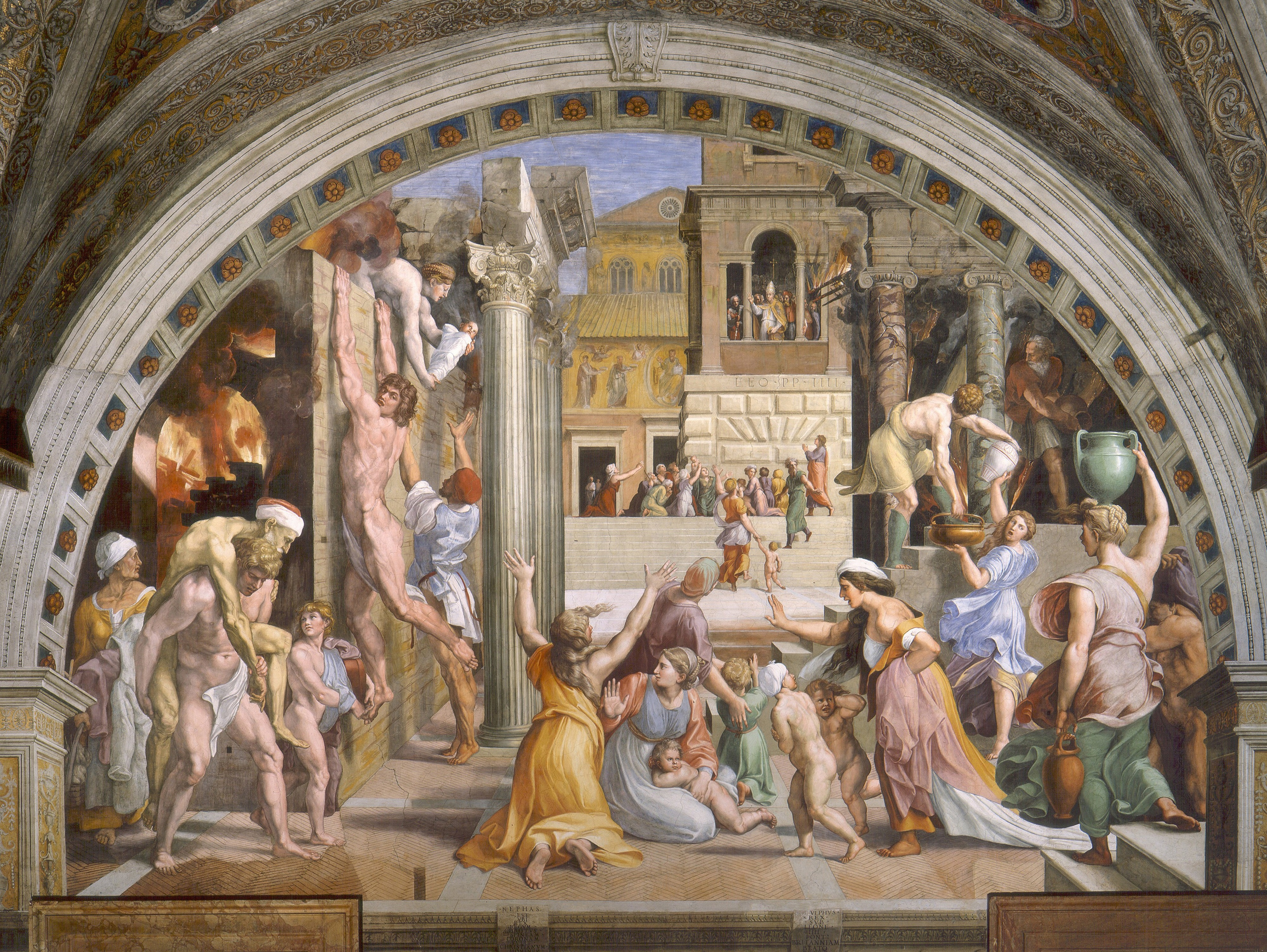
- Artist: Giulio Romano, following original design by Raphael
- Year: 1514-1517
- Type: Fresco
- Dimensions: 670 cm (22.0 ft) wide
- Location: Apostolic Palace, Vatican Museums, Vatican City

The Fire in the Borgo is a painting created by the workshop of the Italian Renaissance artist Raphael between 1514 and 1517. The painting was part of Raphael's commission to decorate the rooms that are now known as the Stanze di Raffaello, in the Apostolic Palace in the Vatican. It depicts Pope Leo IV halting a fire in 847 with a benediction from a balcony in front of the Old St. Peter's Basilica. The mural lends its name to the Stanza dell'incendio del Borgo ("The Room of The Fire in the Borgo"). Though it is assumed that Raphael did make the designs for the complex composition, some critics believe the fresco was most likely painted by his assistant Giulio Romano.

== History ==
Raphael began work on The Fire in the Borgo in 1514 for the private dining chamber of Pope Leo X (elected 11 March 1513). This was the first of several frescoes Raphael painted in this room. The fresco measures seventeen feet by twenty-two feet. The painting tells the story of a fire that broke out in neighborhood near St. Peter's (Borgo can be translated as 'neighborhood'). Pope Leo IV performing a miracle by extinguishing the fire by conferring his blessing from the Loggia of the Blessings.

== Reception ==
Before the 20th century critics often praised the work. Giorgio Vasari, for example, favorably described the painting in the first edition of The Lives of Artists in 1550:

Various perils are represented in this work. In one part we see a number of women whose hair and clothes are blown about by the terrible fury of the wind as carrying vessels full of water on their heads and in their hands they hurry to put out the fire. There are others bewildered and blinded by the smoke as they try to throw water on the flames. On the other side is depicted an infirm old man, distraught by his weakness and the flames of the fire, being carried (as Virgil describes Anchises being carried by Aeneas) by a young man whose face expresses his strength and courage and whose body shows the strain of carrying the figure slumped on his back. He is followed by a dishevelled, bare-footed old woman fleeing from the fire, and going before them is a naked child.

— Giorgio Vasari, Lives of the Most Excellent Painters, Sculptors, and Architects

In the 17th century Giovanni Pietro Bellori stated that "one could not imagine a more beautiful conception than this figure created in the grand style".

In the 19th century Jacob Burckhardt said that in Raphael's image of "flight, rescue, and helpless lamentation" the painter created "the most exalted genre picture that exists."

20th century critics, however, began to dispute the paintings quality and attribution. Hermann Dollmayr, Albert Rosenberg and Ettore Camesasca all criticized the fresco for its lack of unity and rigid figuration. Camesasca, for example, wrote "The composition of the fresco is no more than an unconnected sequence of isolated episodes, generally stamped by a desire to arouse interest in a convenient way by a melodramatic parading of emotions." In the 20th century art historians also began questioning whether Raphael painted the fresco, or if it might be the handiwork of his assistant, Giulio Romano. Frederick Hartt concluded that the painting represents "an idea born of Raphael's mind has here been developed by another and fundamentally different personality."

In 2010, Patricia L. Reilly has argued that the disunity and over-articulated muscular figuration may be intentional, humorous and a parody of Michelangelo's style. Calling attention to the location of the painting in Leo X's private dining chamber, Reilly suggests Raphael may have been painting for a small group. She argues "the Fire in the Borgo was a humorous work that appealed to a very small and elite group of courtiers who were deeply knowledgeable about (and, in some cases, responsible for) the theories of language and literature being developed at that very court... Like Castiglione's perfect courtier, he created a pleasing and humorous work for the perfect place, timing, and kind of people to whom he spoke."
