= Gianfrancesco Penni =

16th-century Italian painter

Gianfrancesco Penni, Virgin with Blue Diadem, 1512. Louvre

Gianfrancesco Penni (1488/1496–1528), called il Fattore, was an Italian painter. His brother Bartolommeo was an artist of the Tudor court of Henry VIII, and another brother, Luca, ended up as one of the Italian artists of the School of Fontainebleau.

== Life ==
Born in Florence to a family of weavers, Penni entered Raphael's workshop very early in his life, and collaborated with him on several works, including the famous Rooms of the Vatican Palace, as well as the frescoes of Villa Farnesina, both in Rome. Heinrich Wölfflin and some other writers credited him with the entire execution of the Raphael Cartoons, with Raphael only creating the initial design, though more recent writers believe Raphael did much of the work himself.

After the premature death of Raphael, Penni collaborated with Giulio Romano to the completion of works such as the Hall of Constantine, the Transfiguration, the Assumption and Coronation of the Virgin (1525) in Monteluce, and the Palazzo Te of Mantua. Penni also provided designs for the tapestries of the life of Christ for Clement VII for the decoration of the Sala del Concistoro in the Vatican.

In 1526, he left Rome and joined back up with Giulio Romano, who had arrived in Mantua in 1524. According to Vasari, he was not well received in Mantua (though he did work with Romano on the frescoes at the Palazzo Te) and so soon began a long journey to Naples via Lombardy and Rome. He died in Naples in 1528. His pupils included Leonardo da Pistoia (Grazia).
