= History of the papacy =

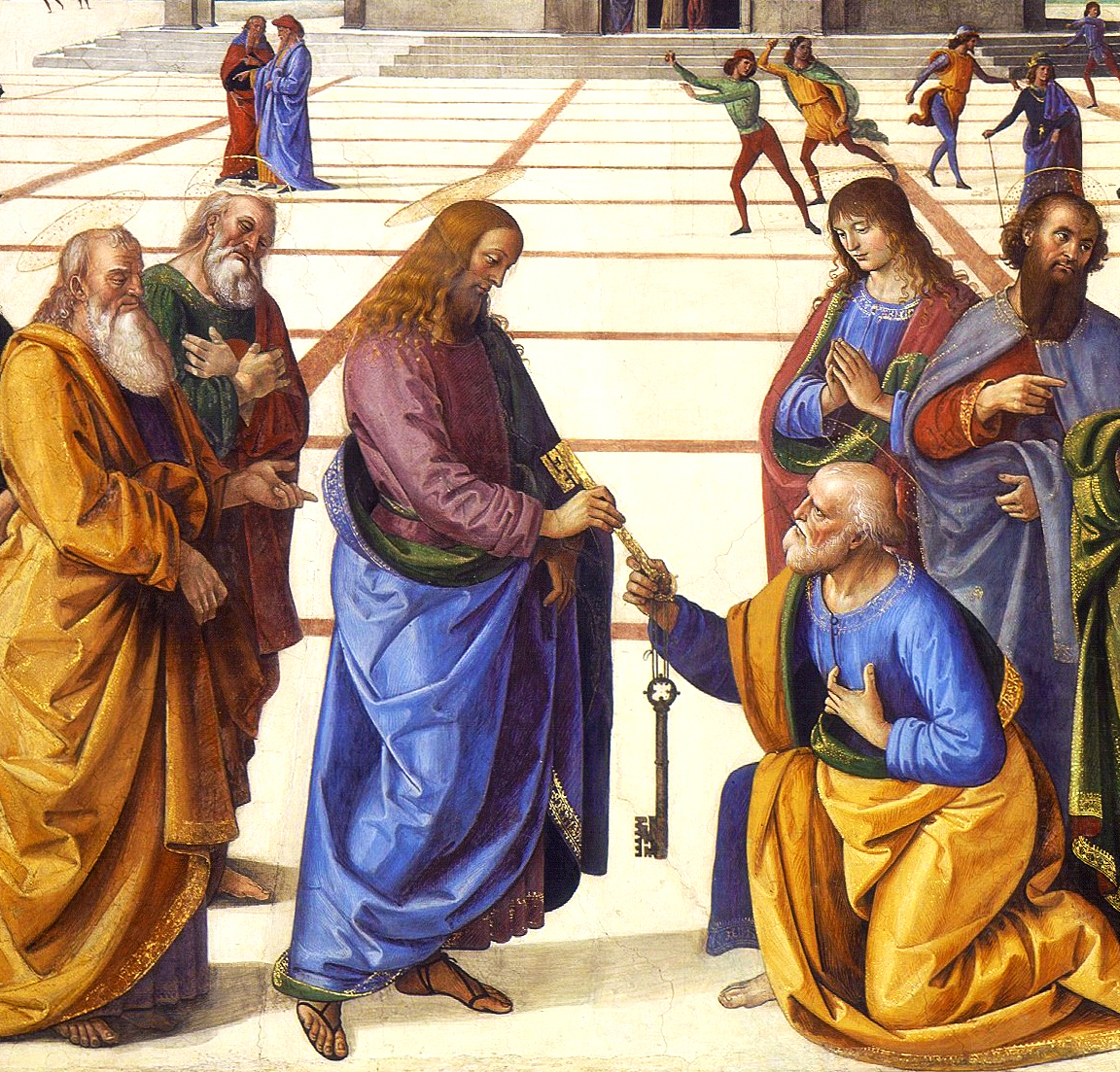
According to Catholic doctrine, the popes are successors of Saint Peter (kneeling, right).

Within Catholicism, the pope is head of the Catholic Church, a position which Catholics believe spans from the time of Saint Peter to the present day.

In the first three centuries of the Christian era, many of Peter's successors as bishops of Rome are obscure figures, most suffering martyrdom along with members of their flock in periods of persecution. During the early Church, the bishops of Rome enjoyed no temporal power until the time of Constantine. After the fall of the Western Roman Empire about 476, the medieval papacy was influenced by the temporal rulers of Italy; these periods are known as the Ostrogothic Papacy, Byzantine Papacy, and Frankish Papacy. Over time, the papacy consolidated its territorial claims to a portion of the peninsula known as the Papal States. Thereafter, the role of neighboring sovereigns was replaced by powerful Roman families during the saeculum obscurum, the Crescentii era, and the Tusculan Papacy.

From 1048 to 1257, the papacy experienced increasing conflict with the leaders and churches of the Holy Roman Empire and the Byzantine Empire (Eastern Roman Empire). Conflict with the latter culminated in the East–West Schism, dividing the Roman and Eastern Churches. From 1257 to 1377, the pope, though the bishop of Rome, resided in Viterbo, Orvieto, and Perugia, and lastly Avignon. The return of the popes to Rome after the Avignon Papacy was followed by the Western Schism: the division of the Western Church between two and, for a time, three competing papal claimants.

The Renaissance Papacy is known for its artistic and architectural patronage, frequent involvement in European power politics, and opposition against theological challenges to papal authority. After the start of the Protestant Reformation, the Reformation Papacy and Baroque Papacy led the Catholic Church through the Counter-Reformation. The popes during the Age of Revolution witnessed the largest expropriation of wealth in the church's history, during the French Revolution and those that followed throughout Europe. The Roman Question, arising from Italian unification, resulted in the loss of the Papal States and the creation of Vatican City.

== During the Roman Empire (until 493) ==
=== Early Christianity ===
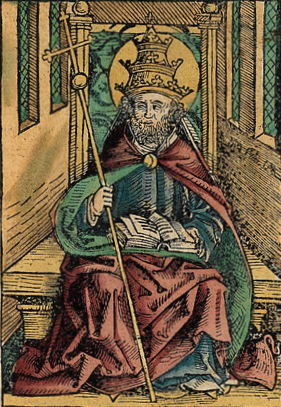
Saint Peter portrayed as a Pope in the Nuremberg Chronicle

Roman Catholics understand the pope to be both the successor to Peter and the first bishop of Rome. Official declarations of the church speak of the popes as holding within the college of the bishops a position analogous to that held by Peter within the "college" of the Apostles, namely Prince of the Apostles, of which the college of the Bishops, a distinct entity, is viewed to be the successor.

Pope Clement I, the earliest of the Church Fathers, is identified with Clement of Philippians 4:3. His letter to the Corinthians is the "first known example of the exercise and acceptance" of the ecclesiastical authority of the papacy. Written while John the Apostle was still alive, Clement commanded that the Corinthians maintain unity with each other and bring to an end the schism that had divided the church in that region. This papal letter from Clement was held in such esteem that it was considered by some as part of the New Testament canon, as the Ethiopian Orthodox Church still does. Dionysius, bishop of Corinth, writing to Pope Soter ("as a father to his children") references Pope Clement's letter:

Today we have kept the holy Lord's day, on which we have read your letter, which we shall ever possess to read and to be admonished, even as the former one written to us through Clement…

Many deny that Peter and those claimed to be his immediate successors had universally-recognized supreme authority over all the early churches, citing instead that the bishop of Rome was, and is, "first among equals" as stated by the patriarch of the Orthodox Church in the 2nd century A.D. and 21st century. However, what form that should take remains a matter of contention between the Catholic and Orthodox churches, which formed one church for at least the first seven ecumenical councils, and until the formal split over papal primacy and the addition of the Filioque in the Nicene Creed in 1054 AD.

Many bishops of Rome in the first three centuries of the Christian era are obscure figures. However, most of Peter's claimed successors in the first three centuries following his life are said to have suffered martyrdom in periods of persecution.

=== From Constantine (312–493) ===
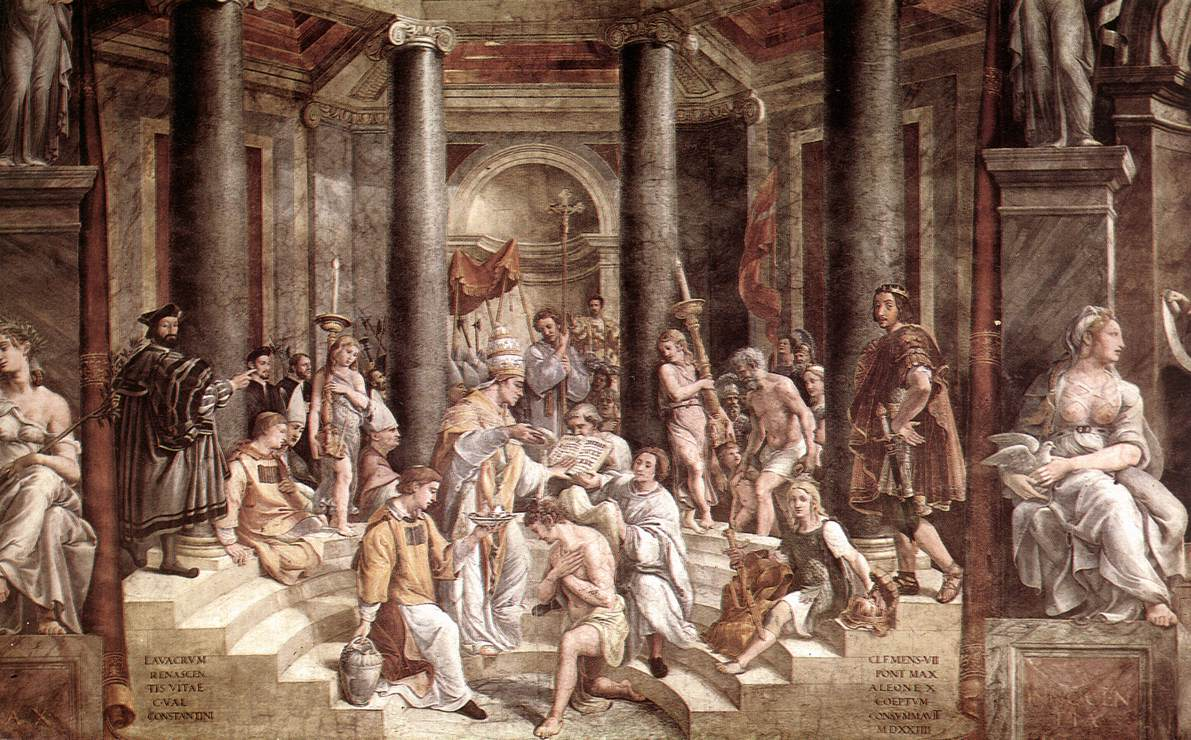
Raphael's The Baptism of Constantine depicts Sylvester I instead of his actual baptizer Eusebius of Nicomedia, an Arian bishop.

The legend surrounding the victory of Constantine I in the Battle of the Milvian Bridge (312) relates his vision of the Chi Rho and the text in hoc signo vinces in the sky, and reproducing this symbol on the shields of his troops. The following year, Constantine and Licinius proclaimed the toleration of the Christian faith with the Edict of Milan, and in 325, Constantine convened and presided over the First Council of Nicaea, the first ecumenical council. This is not related to the pope, who did not attend the council; in fact, the first bishop of Rome to be contemporaneously referred to as Pope is Damasus I (366–84). Moreover, between 324-330, Constantine moved the capital of the Roman Empire to Byzantium, a former Greek city on the Bosporus. The power of Rome was transferred to Byzantium which later, in 330 became Constantinople and today is Istanbul.

The "Donation of Constantine", an 8th-century forgery used to enhance the prestige and authority of popes, places the pope more centrally in the narrative of Constantinian Christianity. The legend of the Donation claims that Constantine offered his crown to Sylvester I (314–35), and even that Sylvester baptized Constantine. In reality, Constantine was baptized (nearing his death in May 337) by Eusebius of Nicomedia, an Arian bishop. Although the "Donation" never occurred, Constantine did hand over the Lateran Palace to the bishop of Rome, and around 310 AD began the construction of the Basilica of Constantine in Germany, called Aula Palatina. Constantine also erected the Old St. Peter's Basilica, or Constantinian Basilica, the location of the current, Renaissance era, St. Peter's Basilica within the Vatican, on the place of St. Peter's burial, as held by the Catholic community of Rome, after his conversion to Catholicism.

Pope Leo I (440–461), was so influential that he was later named a doctor of the Church, a distinction he shares with only one other pope (Gregory I). During his papacy, the term Pope (which previously meant any bishop) came to exclusively mean the Bishop of Rome.

== Middle Ages (493–1417) ==
=== Ostrogothic Papacy (493–537) ===
The Ostrogothic Papacy period ran from 493 to 537. The papal election of March 483 was the first to take place without the existence of a Western Roman emperor. The papacy was strongly influenced by the Ostrogothic Kingdom, though the pope was not outright appointed by the Ostrogothic King. The selection and administration of popes during this period was strongly influenced by Theodoric the Great and his successors Athalaric and Theodahad. This period ended with Justinian I's reconquest of Italy and City of Rome itself during the Gothic War, inaugurating the Byzantine Papacy (537–752).

The role of the Ostrogoths became clear in the first schism, when, on November 22, 498, two men were elected pope. The subsequent triumph of Pope Symmachus (498–514) over Antipope Laurentius is the first recorded example of simony in papal history. Symmachus also instituted the practice of popes naming their own successors, which held until an unpopular choice was made in 530, and discord continued until the selection in 532 of John II, the first to rename himself upon succession.

Theodoric was tolerant towards the Catholic Church and did not interfere in dogmatic matters. He remained as neutral as possible towards the pope, though he exercised a preponderant influence in the affairs of the papacy. Ostrogothic influence ended with the reconquest of Rome by Justinian, who had had pro-Gothic Pope Silverius (536–537) deposed and replaced with his own choice, Pope Vigilius (537–555).

=== Byzantine Papacy (537–752) ===
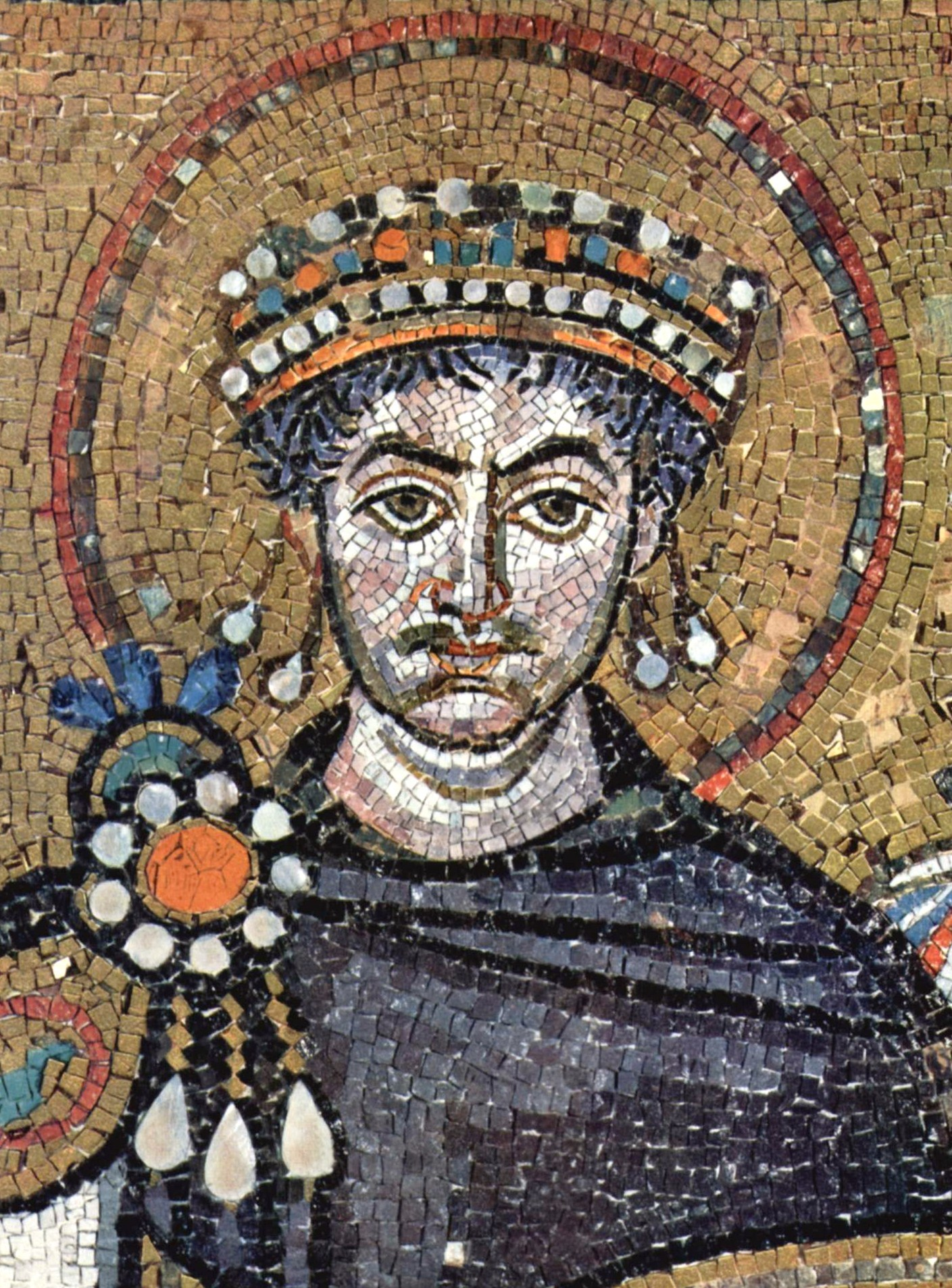
Justinian I re-conquered Rome and appointed the next three popes.

The Byzantine Papacy was a period of return to Imperial domination of the papacy from 537 to 752, when popes required the approval of the Byzantine Emperors for episcopal consecration, and many popes were chosen from the apocrisiarii (liaisons from the pope to the emperor) or the inhabitants of Byzantine Greece, Syria, or Sicily. Justinian I restored the Roman imperial rule in the Italian peninsula after the Gothic War (535–54) and appointed the next three popes, a practice that would be continued by his successors and later be delegated to the Exarchate of Ravenna.

With the exception of Pope Martin I, no pope during this period questioned the authority of the Byzantine monarch to confirm the election of the bishop of Rome before consecration could occur; however, theological conflicts were common between pope and emperor in the areas such as monotheletism and iconoclasm. Greek speakers from Greece, Syria, and Byzantine Sicily replaced members of the powerful Roman nobles from Italian descent in the papal chair during this period. Rome under the Greek popes constituted a "melting pot" of Western and Eastern Christian traditions, reflected in art as well as liturgy.

Pope Gregory I (590–604) was a major figure in asserting papal primacy within the Papacy's local jurisdiction and gave the impetus to missionary activity in northern Europe, including England. Gregory I rejected that any bishop had universal jurisdiction, but believed the Roman see had canonical privileges sourced from the Council of Sardica.

The Duchy of Rome was a Byzantine district in the Exarchate of Ravenna, ruled by an imperial functionary with the title dux. Within the exarchate, the two chief districts were the country about Ravenna where the exarch was the centre of Byzantine opposition to the Lombards, and the Duchy of Rome, which embraced the lands of Latium north of the Tiber and of Campania to the south as far as the Garigliano. There the pope himself was the soul of the opposition.

The pains were taken, as long as possible, to retain control of the intervening districts and with them communication over the Apennine mountains. In 728, the Lombard King Liutprand took the Castle of Sutri, on the road to Perugia, but restored it to Pope Gregory II "as a gift to the blessed Apostles Peter and Paul". The popes continued to acknowledge the imperial Government.

In 738, the Lombard duke Transamund of Spoleto captured the Castle of Gallese, which protected the road to Perugia. By a large payment, Pope Gregory III induced the duke to restore the castle to him.

=== Frankish influence (756–857) ===
In 751, Aistulf took Ravenna and threatened Rome. In response to this threat, Pope Stephen II made an unusual journey north of the Alps to visit the Frankish king, Pepin III, to seek his help against the invading Lombards. The papal elections were marked by battles between various secular and ecclesiastical factions frequently entangled in the power politics of Italy.

The pope anointed Pepin at the abbey of St Denis, near Paris, together with Pepin's two young sons Charles and Carloman. Pepin duly invaded northern Italy in 754, and again in 756. Pepin was able to drive the Lombards from the territory belonging to Ravenna but he did not restore it to its rightful owner, the Byzantine emperor. Instead, he handed over large areas of central Italy to the pope and his successors.

The land given to pope Stephen in 756, in the so-called Donation of Pepin, made the papacy a temporal power and for the first time created an incentive for secular leaders to interfere with papal succession. This territory would become the basis for the Papal States, over which the popes ruled until the Papal States were incorporated into the new Kingdom of Italy in 1870. For the next eleven centuries, the story of Rome would be almost synonymous with the story of the papacy.

After being physically attacked by his enemies in the streets of Rome, Pope Leo III made his way in 799 through the Alps to visit Charlemagne at Paderborn.

It is not known what was agreed between the two, but Charlemagne traveled to Rome in 800 to support the pope. In a ceremony in St Peter's Basilica, on Christmas Day, Leo was supposed to anoint Charlemagne's son as his heir. But unexpectedly (it is maintained), as Charlemagne rose from prayer, the pope placed a crown on his head and acclaimed him emperor. It is reported that Charlemagne expressed displeasure but nevertheless accepted the honour.

Charlemagne's successor, "Louis the Pious", intervened in the papal election by supporting the claim of Pope Eugene II; the popes henceforth were required to swear loyalty to the Frankish Emperor. Papal subjects were made to swear loyalty to the Frankish Emperor and the consecration of the pope could be performed only in the presence of the Emperor's representatives. The consecration of Pope Gregory IV (827–844), chosen by the Roman nobles, was delayed for six months to attain the assent of Louis. Pope Sergius II (844–847), choice of the Roman nobility, was consecrated without reference to Emperor Lothaire, the latter sent his son Louis with an army, and only when "Sergius succeeded in pacifying Louis, whom he crowned king" did Lothair I side with Sergius II.

=== Influence of powerful Roman families (904–1048) ===
The period beginning with the installation of Pope Sergius III in 904 and lasting for sixty years until the death of Pope John XII in 964 is sometimes referred to as Saeculum obscurum or the "dark age." Historian Will Durant refers to the period from 867 to 1049 as the "nadir of the papacy".

During this period, the popes were controlled by a powerful and corrupt aristocratic family, the Theophylacti, and their relatives.

=== Conflicts with the emperor and East (1048–1257) ===
The Imperial crown once held by the Carolingian emperors was disputed between their fractured heirs and local overlords; none emerged victorious until Otto I, Holy Roman Emperor invaded Italy. Italy became a constituent kingdom of the Holy Roman Empire in 962, from which point the emperors were German. As emperors consolidated their position, northern Italian city-states would become divided by Guelphs and Ghibellines. Henry III, Holy Roman Emperor found three rival popes when he visited Rome in 1048 because of the unprecedented actions of Pope Benedict IX. He deposed all three and installed his own preferred candidate: Pope Clement II.

The history of the papacy from 1048 to 1257 would continue to be marked by conflict between popes and the Holy Roman Emperor, most prominently the Investiture Controversy, a dispute over who—pope or emperor—could appoint bishops within the empire. Henry IV's Walk to Canossa in 1077 to meet Pope Gregory VII (1073–85), although not dispositive within the context of the larger dispute, has become legendary. Although the emperor renounced any right to lay investiture in the Concordat of Worms (1122), the issue would flare up again.

Long-standing divisions between East and West also came to a head in the East–West Schism and the Crusades. The first seven Ecumenical Councils had been attended by both Western and Eastern prelates, but growing doctrinal, theological, linguistic, political and geographic differences finally resulted in mutual denunciations and excommunications. Pope Urban II (1088–99) convened a council at Clermont in November 1095 with the hopes of reunion and lending support to the Byzantines who wanted to reclaim their lands lost to the Seljuk Turks. After the 10-day council Pope Urban II gave a rousing speech to a massive crowd when he "emphasized the duty of the Christian West to march to the rescue of the Christian East." This speech became the rallying cry of the First Crusade, which commenced nine months later, in August 1096.

Unlike the previous millennium, the process for papal selection became somewhat fixed during this period. Pope Nicholas II promulgated In nomine Domini in 1059, which limited suffrage in papal elections to the College of Cardinals. The rules and procedures of papal elections evolved during this period, laying the groundwork for the modern papal conclave. The driving force behind these reforms was Cardinal Hildebrand, who later became Gregory VII.

=== Wandering popes (1257–1309) ===
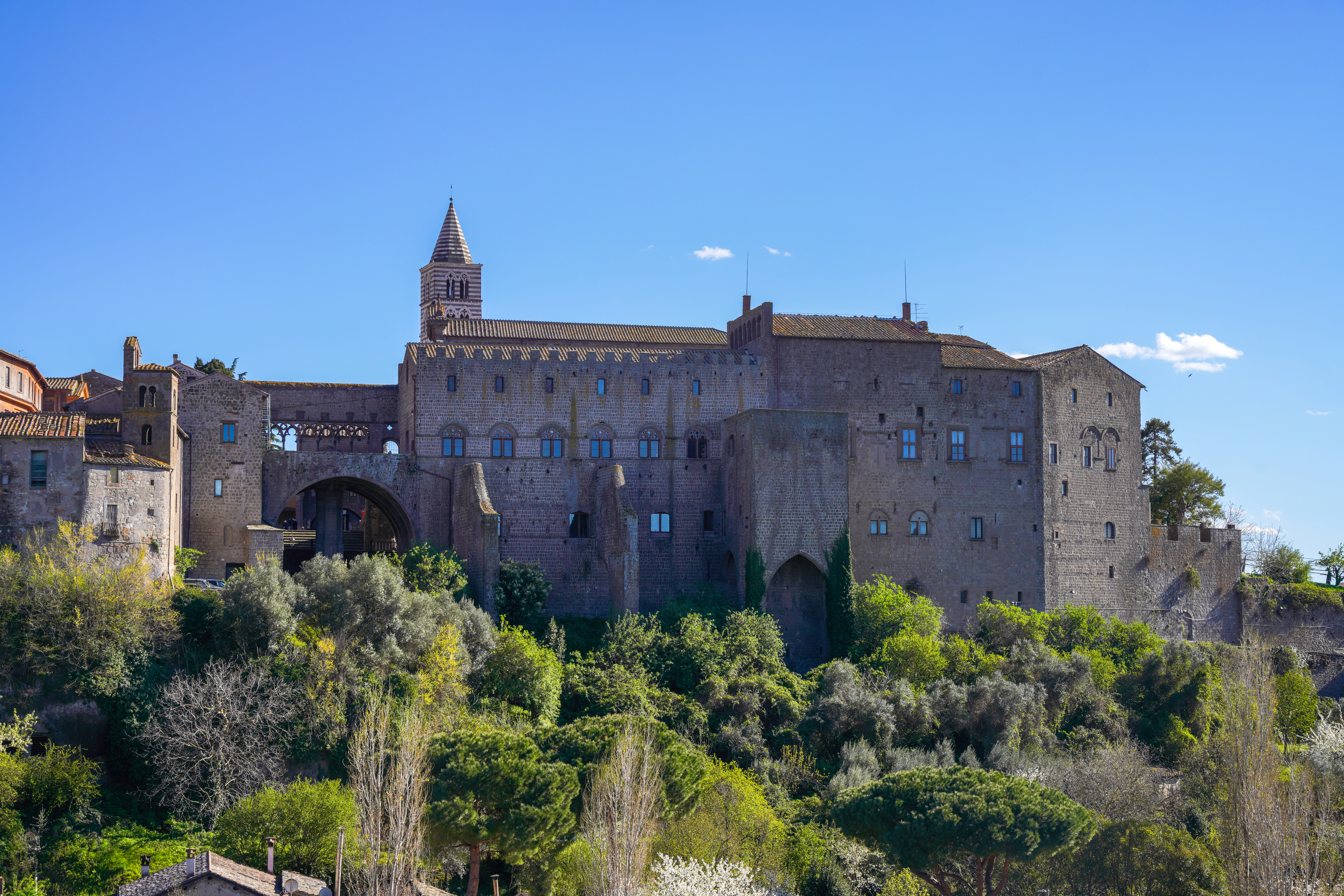
The papal palace in Viterbo...

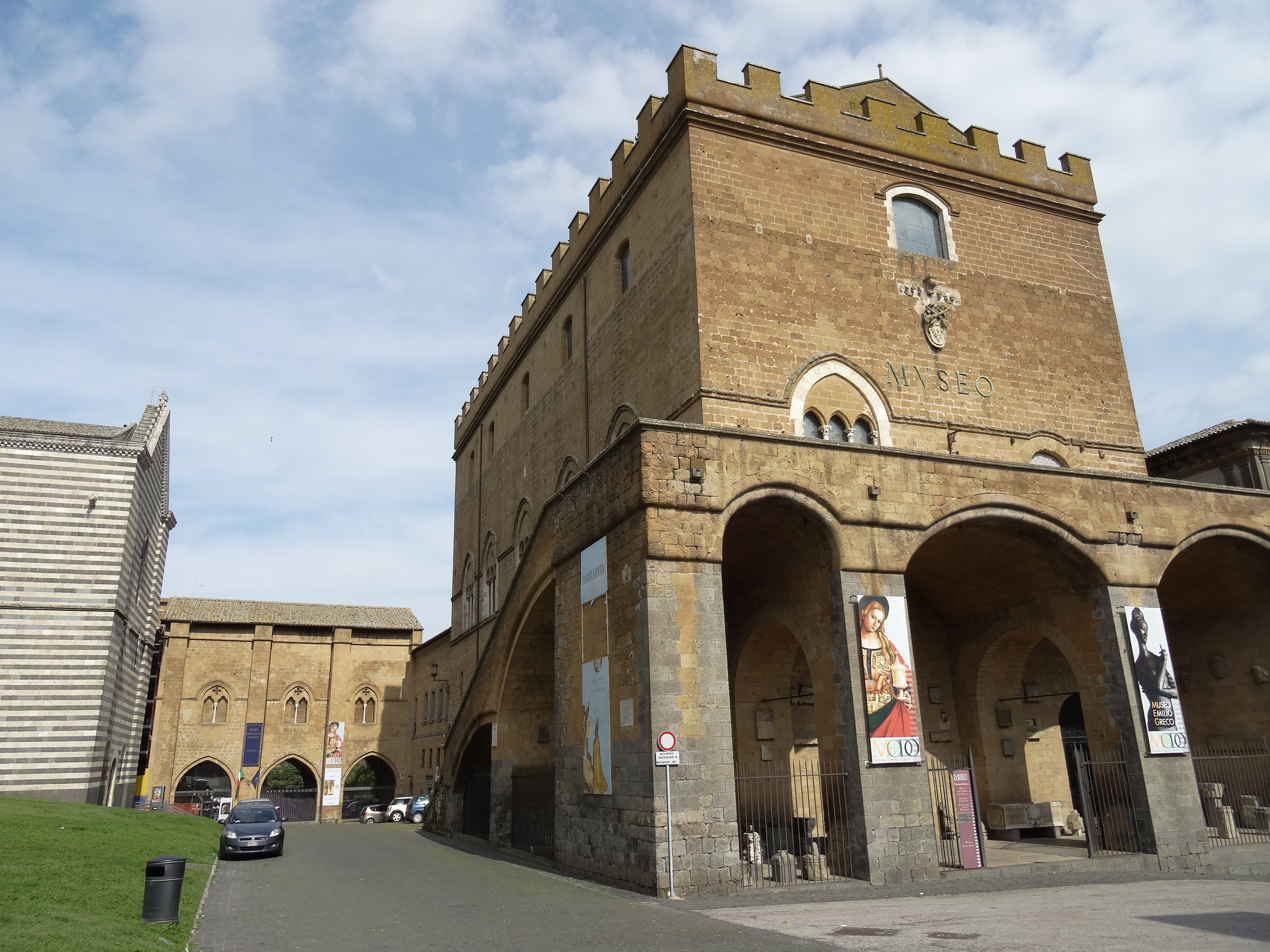
...and Orvieto

The pope is the bishop of Rome, but nowhere is it written that he has to stay there (in fact, only 200 years prior, cardinals would have been required to reside in Rome). Political instability in thirteenth-century Italy forced the papal court to move to several different locations, including Viterbo, Orvieto, and Perugia. The popes brought the Roman Curia with them, and the College of Cardinals met in the city where the last pope had died to hold papal elections. Host cities enjoyed a boost to their prestige and certain economic advantages, but the municipal authorities risked being subsumed into the administration of the Papal States if they allowed the pope to overstay his welcome.

According to Eamon Duffy, "aristocratic factions within the city of Rome once again made it an insecure base for a stable papal government. Innocent IV was exiled from Rome and even from Italy for six years, and all but two of the papal elections of the thirteenth century had to take place outside Rome. The skyline of Rome itself was now dominated by the fortified war-towers of the aristocracy (a hundred were built in Innocent IV's pontificate alone) and the popes increasingly spent their time in the papal palaces at Viterbo and Orvieto."

=== Avignon Papacy (1309–1377) ===
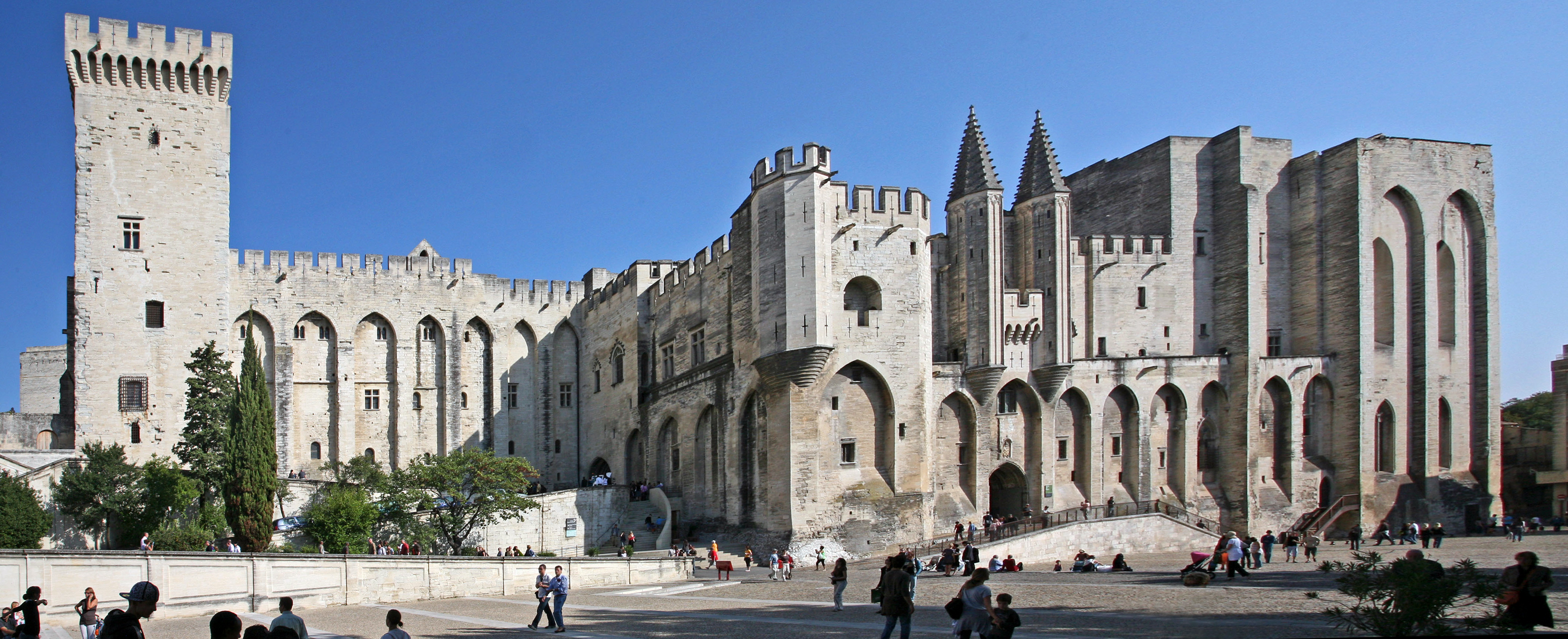
The Palais des Papes in Avignon

During this period, seven popes, all French, resided in Avignon starting in 1309: Pope Clement V (1305–14), Pope John XXII (1316–34), Pope Benedict XII (1334–42), Pope Clement VI (1342–52), Pope Innocent VI (1352–62), Pope Urban V (1362–70), Pope Gregory XI (1370–78). The papacy was controlled by the French King in this time. In 1378, Gregory XI moved the papal residence back to Rome and died there.

=== Western Schism (1378–1417) ===
The division of European allegiances at a point during the Western Schism. Caution: this map is highly inaccurate in some regions and borders, see its talk page.

The French cardinals withdrew to a conclave of their own, where they elected one of their number, Robert of Geneva. He took the name Clement VII. This was the beginning of the period of difficulty from 1378 to 1417 which Catholic scholars refer to as the "Western Schism" or, "the great controversy of the antipopes" (also called "the second great schism" by some secular and Protestant historians), when parties within the Catholic Church were divided in their allegiances among the various claimants to the office of pope. The Council of Constance, in 1417, finally resolved the controversy.

Another council was convened in 1414 at Constance. In March 1415, the Pisan antipope, John XXIII, fled from Constance in disguise; he was brought back a prisoner and deposed in May. The Roman pope, Gregory XII, resigned voluntarily in July.

The council in Constance, having finally cleared the field of popes and antipopes, elected Pope Martin V as pope in November.

== Early modern and modern era (1417–present) ==
=== Renaissance papacy (1417–1534) ===
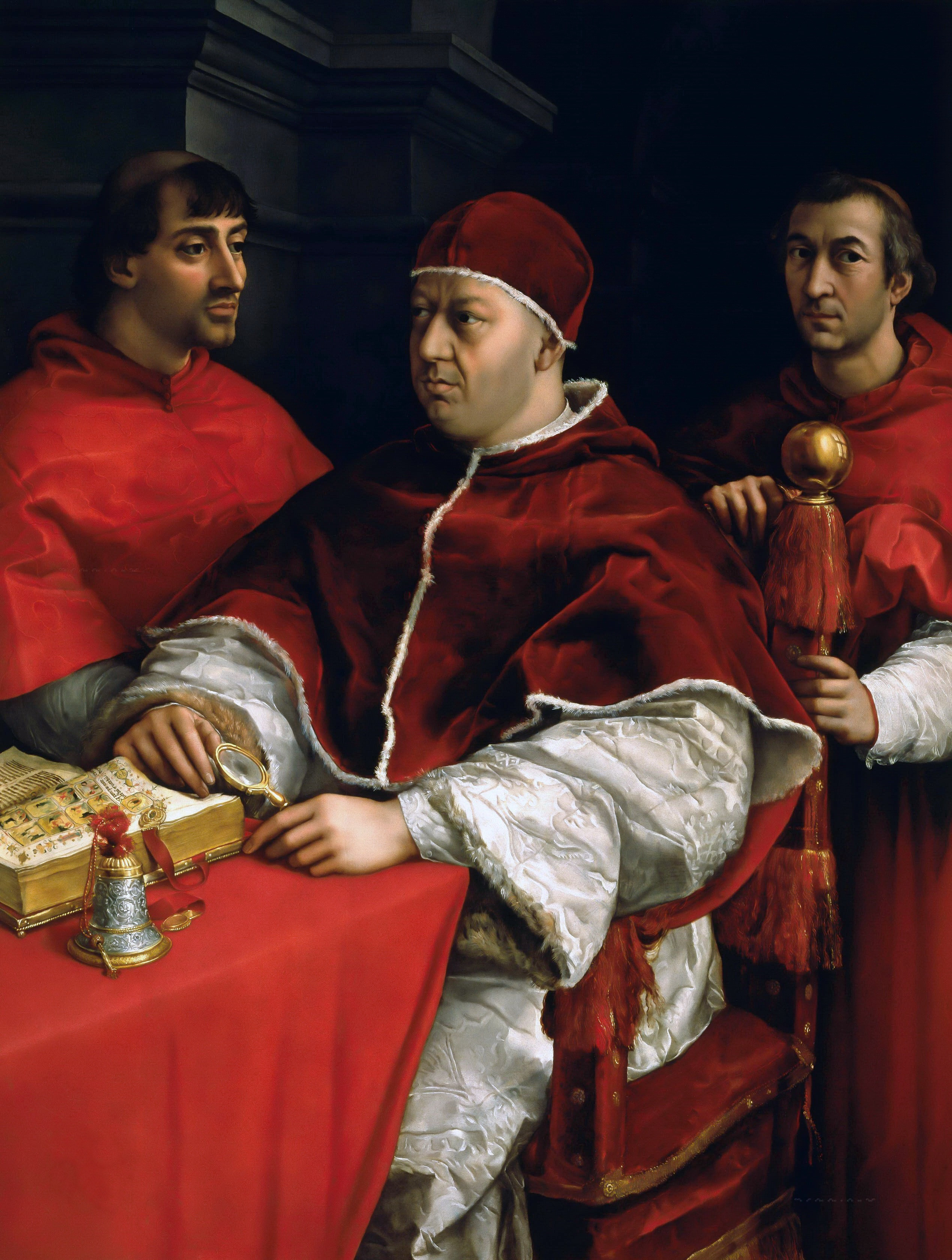
Pope Leo X with his cousins Giulio de' Medici (left, the future Pope Clement VII) and Luigi de' Rossi (right), whom he appointed as cardinal-nephews

From the election of Pope Martin V of the Council of Constance in 1417 to the Reformation, Western Christianity was largely free from schism as well as significant disputed papal claimants. Martin V returned the papacy to Rome in 1420. Although there were important divisions over the direction of the religion, these were resolved through the then-settled procedures of the papal conclave.

Unlike their European peers, popes were not hereditary monarchs, so they could only promote their family interests through nepotism. The word nepotism originally referred specifically to the practice of creating cardinal-nephews, when it appeared in the English language about 1669. According to Duffy, "the inevitable outcome of all of this was a creation of a wealthy cardinalatial class, with strong dynastic connections." The college was dominated by cardinal-nephews—relatives of the popes that elevated them, crown-cardinals—representatives of the Catholic monarchies of Europe, and members of the powerful Italian families. The wealthy popes and cardinals increasingly patronized Renaissance art and architecture, (re)building the landmarks of Rome from the ground up.

The Papal States began to resemble a modern nation state during this period, and the papacy took an increasingly active role in European wars and diplomacy. Pope Julius II become known as "the Warrior Pope" for his use of bloodshed to increase the territory and property of the papacy. The popes of this period used the papal military not only to enrich themselves and their families, but also to enforce and expand upon the longstanding territorial and property claims of the papacy as an institution. Although, before the Western Schism, the papacy had derived much of its revenue from the "vigorous exercise of its spiritual office," during this period the popes were financially dependent on the revenues from the Papal States themselves. With ambitious expenditures on war and construction projects, popes turned to new sources of revenue from the sale of indulgences and bureaucratic and ecclesiastical offices. Pope Clement VII's diplomatic and military campaigns resulted in the Sack of Rome in 1527.

Popes were more frequently called upon to arbitrate disputes between competing colonial powers than to resolve complicated theological disputes. Columbus' discovery in 1492 upset the unstable relations between the kingdoms of Portugal and Castile, whose jockeying for possession of colonial territories along the African coast had for many years been regulated by the papal bulls of 1455, 1456, and 1479. Alexander VI responded with three bulls, dated May 3 and 4, which were highly favorable to Castile; the third Inter caetera (1493) awarded Spain the sole right to colonize most of the New World.

According to Eamon Duffy, "the Renaissance papacy invokes images of a Hollywood spectacular, all decadence and drag. Contemporaries viewed Renaissance Rome as we now view Nixon's Washington, a city of expense-account whores and political graft, where everything and everyone had a price, where nothing and nobody could be trusted. The popes themselves seemed to set the tone." For example, Leo X was said to have remarked: "Let us enjoy the papacy, since God has given it to us." Several of these popes took mistresses and fathered children and engaged in intrigue or even murder. Alexander VI had four acknowledged children: Cesare Borgia, Lucrezia Borgia, Gioffre Borgia, and Giovanni Borgia before he became Pope.

=== Reformation and Counter-Reformation (1517–1580) ===
The Reformation (1517–1580) challenged the papacy, with figures like Martin Luther labeling it as the Antichrist and criticizing practices like indulgences. In response, the Catholic Church launched the Counter-Reformation, led by Pope Paul III and the Council of Trent (1545–1563), which reaffirmed Catholic doctrines and initiated reforms to address corruption. Subsequent popes, including Paul IV, intensified efforts to combat heresy and promote Catholic renewal.

=== Baroque papacy (1585–1689) ===
The pontificate of Pope Sixtus V (1585–1590) opened up the final stage of the Catholic Reformation, characteristic of the Baroque age of the early seventeenth century, shifting away from compelling to attracting. His reign focused on rebuilding Rome as a great European capital and Baroque city, a visual symbol for the Catholic Church.

=== The Roman question (1870–1929) ===
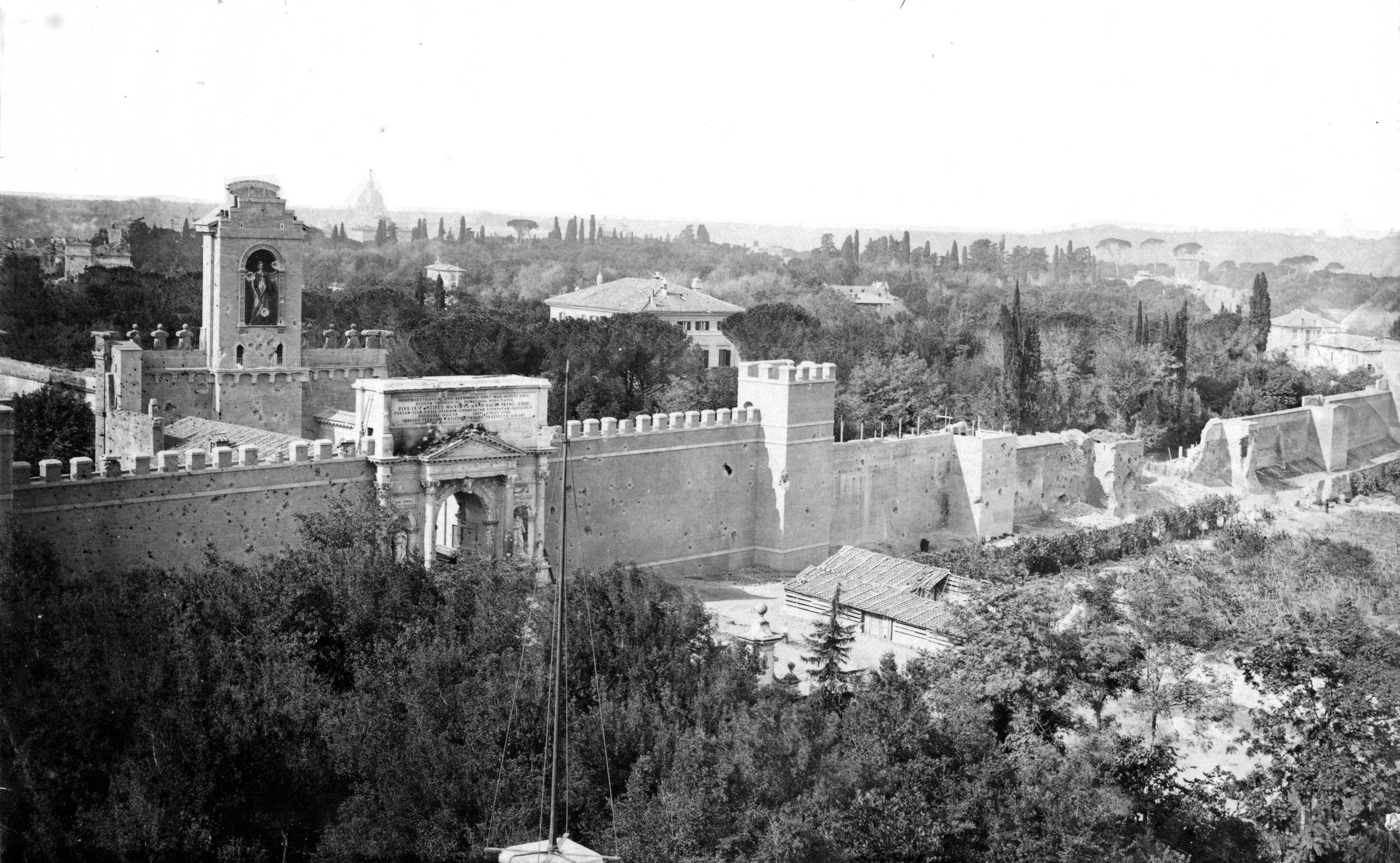
The breach of the Porta Pia during the Capture of Rome

The last eight years of his long pontificate – the longest in church history – Pope Pius IX spent as prisoner of the Vatican. Catholics were forbidden to vote or be voted for in national elections. However, they were permitted to participate in local elections, where they achieved successes. Pius himself was active during those years by creating new diocesan seats and appointing bishops to numerous dioceses, which had been unoccupied for years. Asked if he wanted his successor to follow his Italian policies, the old pontiff replied:

My successor may be inspired by my love to the Church and my wish to do the right thing. Everything changed around me. My system and my policies had their time, I am too old to change direction. This will be the task of my successor.

Pope Leo XIII, considered a great diplomat, managed to improve relations with Russia, Prussia, German France, England and other countries. However, in light of a hostile anti-Catholic climate in Italy, he continued the policies of Pius IX towards Italy, without major modifications. He had to defend the freedom of the church against Italian persecutions and attacks in the area of education, expropriation and violation of Catholic Churches, legal measures against the church and brutal attacks, culminating in anticlerical groups attempting to throw the body of the deceased Pope Pius IX into the Tiber river on July 13, 1881. The pope even considered moving the papacy to Trieste or Salzburg, two cities under Austrian control, an idea which the Austrian monarch Franz Josef I gently rejected.

His encyclicals changed church positions on relations with temporal authorities, and, in the 1891 encyclical Rerum novarum addressed for the first time social inequality and social justice issues with Papal authority. He was greatly influenced by Wilhelm Emmanuel von Ketteler, a German bishop who openly propagated siding with the suffering working classes Since Leo XIII, Papal teachings expand on the right and obligation of workers and the limitations of private property: Pope Pius XI Quadragesimo anno, the Social teachings of Pope Pius XII on a huge range of social issues, John XXIII Mater et magistra in 1961, Pope Paul VI, the encyclical Populorum progressio on World development issues, and Pope John Paul II, Centesimus annus, commemorating the 100th anniversary of Rerum novarum of Pope Leo XIII.

=== From the creation of Vatican City (1929) ===
The pontificate of Pope Pius XI was marked by great diplomatic activity and the issuance of many important papers, often in the form of encyclicals. In diplomatic affairs, Pius was aided at first by Pietro Gasparri and after 1930 by Eugenio Pacelli (who succeeded him as Pope Pius XII). Cardinal Gasparri's masterpiece was the Lateran Treaty (1929), negotiated for the Vatican by Francesco Pacelli. Nevertheless, the Fascist government and the pope were in open disagreement over the restriction of youth activities; this culminated in a strong papal letter (Non abbiamo bisogno, 1931), arguing the impossibility of being at once a Fascist and a Catholic. Relations between Mussolini and the Holy See were cool ever after.

Negotiations for the settlement of the Roman Question began in 1926 between the government of Italy and the Holy See, and in 1929 they culminated in the agreements of the three Lateran Pacts, signed for King Victor Emmanuel III of Italy by Prime Minister Benito Mussolini and for Pope Pius XI by Cardinal Secretary of State Pietro Gasparri in the Lateran Palace (hence the name by which they are known).

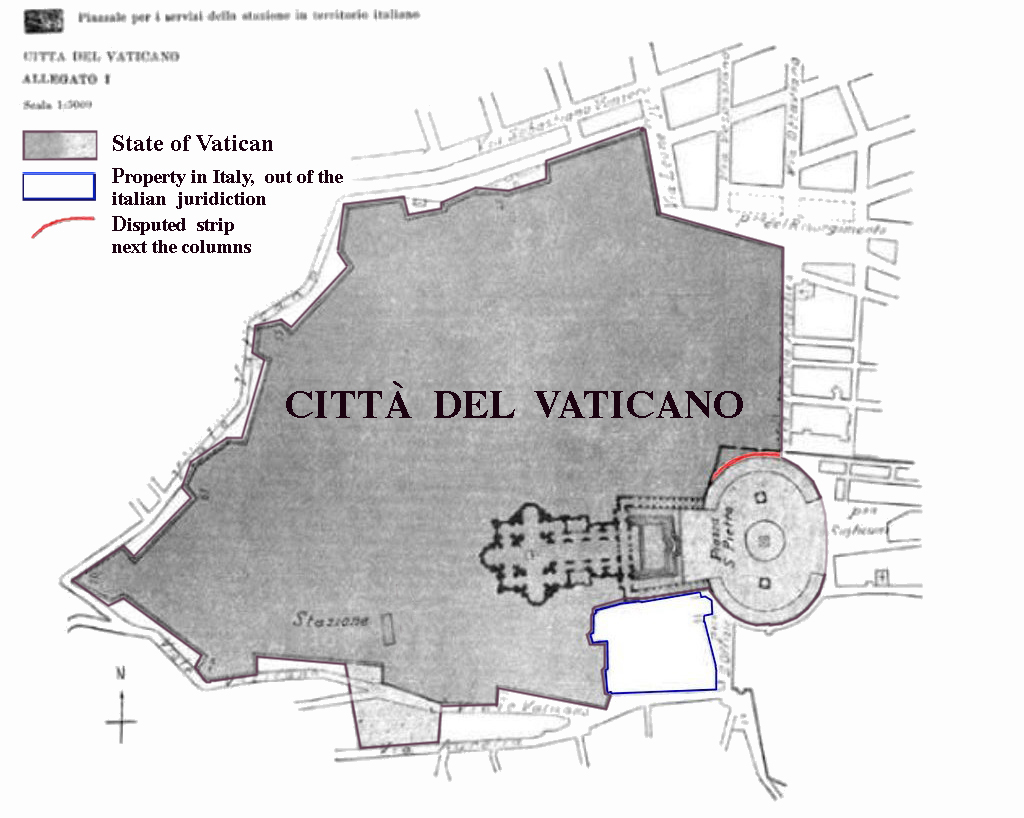
A map of Vatican City, as established by the Lateran Treaty (1929)

The Lateran Treaty included a political treaty, which created the state of the Vatican City and guaranteed full and independent sovereignty to the Holy See. The pope was pledged to perpetual neutrality in international relations and to abstention from mediation in a controversy unless specifically requested by all parties. The concordat established Catholicism as the religion of Italy. And the financial agreement was accepted as settlement of all the claims of the Holy See against Italy arising from the loss of temporal power in 1870.

A national concordat with Germany was one of Pacelli's main objectives as secretary of state. As nuncio during the 1920s, he had made unsuccessful attempts to obtain German agreement for such a treaty, and between 1930 and 1933 he attempted to initiate negotiations with representatives of successive German governments, but the opposition of Protestant and Socialist parties, the instability of national governments and the care of the individual states to guard their autonomy thwarted this aim. In particular, the questions of denominational schools and pastoral work in the armed forces prevented any agreement on the national level, despite talks in the winter of 1932.

Adolf Hitler was appointed Chancellor on 30 January 1933 and sought to gain international respectability and to remove internal opposition by representatives of the church and the Catholic Centre Party. He sent his vice chancellor Franz von Papen, a Catholic nobleman and former member of the Centre Party, to Rome to offer negotiations about a Reichskonkordat. On behalf of Cardinal Pacelli, his long-time associate Prelate Ludwig Kaas, the out-going chairman of the Centre Party, negotiated first drafts of the terms with Papen. The concordat was finally signed, by Pacelli for the Vatican and von Papen for Germany, on 20 July and ratified on September 10, 1933.

Between 1933 and 1939, Pacelli issued 55 protests of violations of the Reichskonkordat. Most notably, early in 1937, Pacelli asked several German cardinals, including Cardinal Michael von Faulhaber to help him write a protest of Nazi violations of the Reichskonkordat; this was to become Pius XI's encyclical Mit brennender Sorge. The encyclical, condemning the view that "exalts race, or the people, or the State, or a particular form of State … above their standard value and divinizes them to an idolatrous level", was written in German instead of Latin and read in German churches on Palm Sunday 1937.

==== World War II (1939–1945) ====
When Germany invaded Poland on September 1, 1939, the Vatican declared neutrality to avoid being drawn into the conflict and also to avoid occupation by the Italian military. The Church policies after World War II of Pope Pius XII focused on material aid to war-torn Europe with its 15 million displaced persons and refugees, an internal internationalization of the Catholic Church, and the development of its worldwide diplomatic relations. His encyclical Evangelii praecones increased the local decision-making of Catholic missions, many of which became independent dioceses. Pius XII demanded recognition of local cultures as fully equal to European culture. He internationalized the College of Cardinals by eliminating the Italian majority and appointed cardinals from Asia, South America and Australia. In Western Africa Southern Africa British Eastern Africa, Finland, Burma and French Africa Pope Pius established independent dioceses in 1955.

While after years of rebuilding the church thrived in the West and most of the developing world, it faced most serious persecutions in the East. Sixty million Catholics came under Soviet dominated regimes in 1945, with tens of thousands of priests and religious killed, and millions deported into Soviet and Chinese Gulags. The communist regimes in Albania, Bulgaria, Romania and China practically eradicated the Catholic Church in their countries

==== From Vatican II (1962–1965) to the present ====
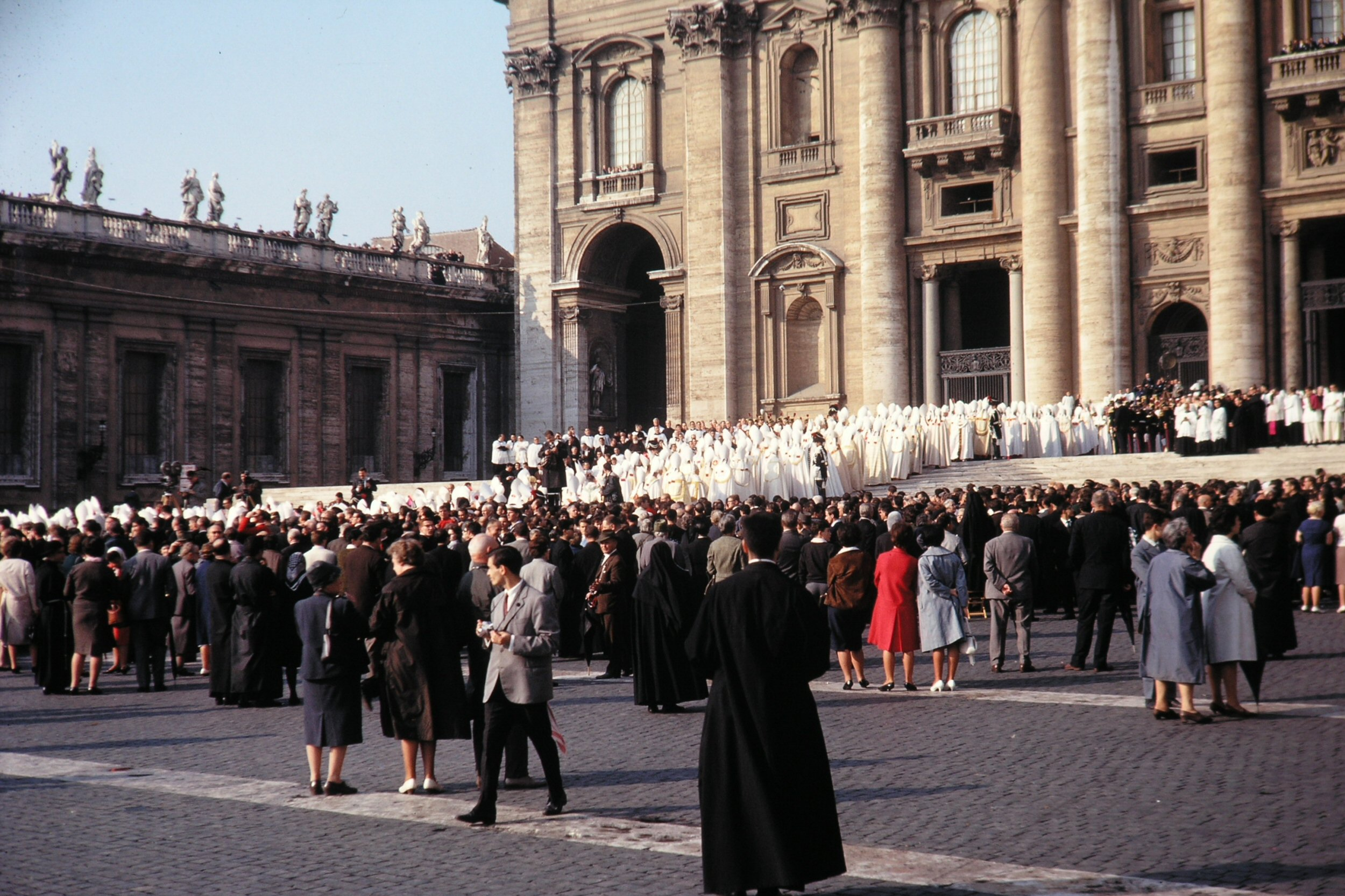
The opening of the Second Session of the Second Vatican Council

On October 11, 1962, Pope John XXIII opened the Second Ecumenical Vatican Council. The 21st ecumenical council of the Catholic Church emphasized the universal call to holiness and brought many changes in practices. On December 7, 1965, a Joint Catholic-Orthodox Declaration of Pope Paul VI and the Ecumenical Patriarch Athenagoras I lifted the mutual excommunication against Catholic and Orthodox which had been in force since the Great Schism of 1054.

The bishops agreed that the pope exercises supreme authority over the church, but defined "collegiality", meaning that all bishops share in this authority. Local bishops have equal authority as successors of the Apostles and as members of a larger organization, the church founded by Jesus Christ and entrusted to the apostles. The pope serves as a symbol of unity and has additional authority to ensure the continuation of that unity. During the Second Vatican Council, Catholic bishops drew back a bit from statements which might anger Christians of other faiths. Cardinal Augustin Bea, the President of the Christian Unity Secretariat had always the full support of Pope Paul VI in his attempts to ensure that the Council language is friendly and open to the sensitivities of Protestant and Orthodox Churches, whom he had invited to all sessions at the request of Pope John XXIII. Bea also was strongly involved in the passage of Nostra aetate, which regulates relation of the church with the Jewish faith and members of other religions.

Pope Paul VI (1963–1978), however, continued the ecumenical efforts of Pope John XXIII in his contacts with Protestant and Orthodox churches. Pope Paul VI faced criticism throughout his papacy from both traditionalists and liberals for steering a middle course during Vatican II and in the course of the implementation of its reforms thereafter. His passion for peace during the Vietnam War was not understood by all. The urgent task of overcoming World poverty and start real development resulted partly in benign neglect of papal teachings by the influential and the rich. On basic church teachings, this pope was unwavering. On the tenth anniversary of Humanae vitae, he strongly reconfirmed his teachings. In his style and methodology, he was a disciple of Pius XII, whom he deeply revered. He suffered under the attacks of his predecessor for his alleged silences, knowing from personal association with the late pope the real concerns and compassion of Pius XII. Pope Paul is not credited to have had the encyclopaedic culture of Pius XII, nor his phenomenal memory, his amazing gift for languages, his brilliant style in writing, nor did he have the Charisma and outpouring love, sense of humor and human warmth of John XXIII. He took on himself the unfinished reform work of these two popes, bringing them diligently with great humility and common sense and without much fanfare to conclusion. In doing so, Paul VI saw himself following in the footsteps of the Apostle Paul, torn to several directions as Saint Paul, who always said, I am attracted to two sides at once, because the Cross always divides.

He became the first pope to visit all five continents. Paul VI systematically continued and completed the efforts of his predecessors, to turn the Euro-centric church into a church for the whole world, by integrating the bishops from all continents in its government and in the Synods which he convened. His August 6, 1967 Motu Proprio Pro Comperto Sane opened the Roman Curia to the bishops of the world. Until that time, only Cardinals could be leading members of the Curia.

An inner joy seems to have been a characteristic of Paul VI. His confessor, the Jesuit Paolo Dezza arrived at the Vatican every Friday evening at seven p.m. to hear confession of Paul VI. The only words he ever spoke about his long service to Paul VI during his pontificate were, that this pope is a man of great joy. After the death of Pope Paul VI, Dezza was more outspoken, saying that "if Paul VI was not a saint, when he was elected pope, he became one during his pontificate. I was able to witness not only with what energy and dedication he toiled for Christ and the Church but also and above all, how much he suffered for Christ and the Church. I always admired not only his deep inner resignation but also his constant abandonment to divine providence." It is this character trait, which led to the opening of the process of beatification and canonization for Paul VI.

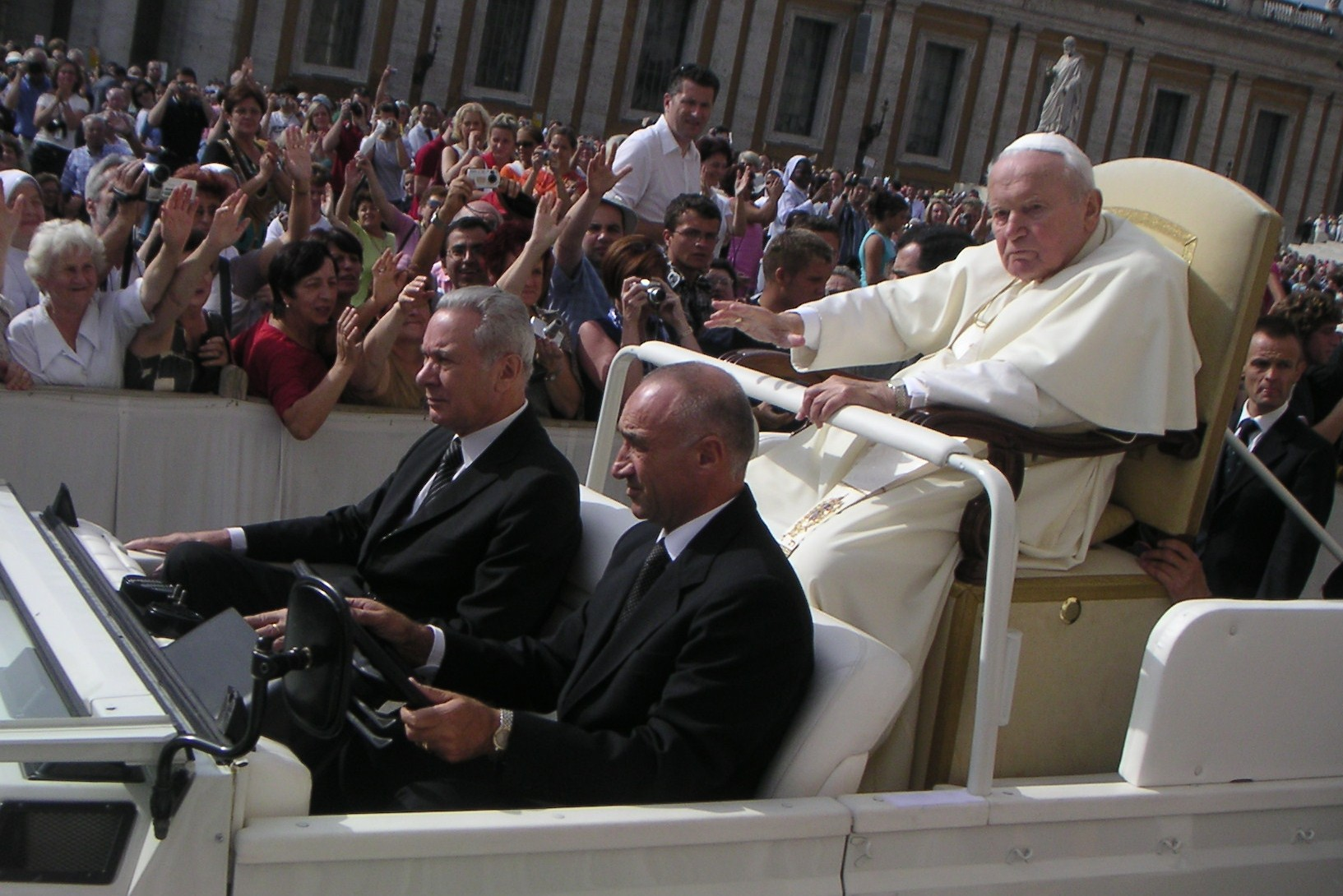
Pope John Paul II (1978–2005)

With the accession of Pope John Paul II after the death of Pope John Paul I (who was only pope for 33 days), the church had, for the first time since Pope Adrian VI in the 16th century, a non-Italian pope. John Paul II has been credited with helping to bring down communism in eastern Europe by sparking what amounted to a peaceful revolution in his Polish homeland. Lech Wałęsa, one of the several founders of the Solidarity worker movement that ultimately toppled communism, credited John Paul with giving Poles the courage to rise up. The former Soviet general secretary Mikhail Gorbachev acknowledged publicly the role of John Paul II in the fall of Communism. The pope himself stated after the fall of Communism that "the claim to build a world without God has been shown to be an illusion" (Prague, April 21, 1990).

But this world without God exists under capitalism too. Therefore, as did his predecessors, John Paul reiterated Christianity's defense of the human person, and warned against the dangers of capitalism, particularly in Centesimus annus. "Unfortunately, not everything the West proposes as a theoretical vision or as a concrete lifestyle reflects Gospel values."

The long pontificate of John Paul is credited with re-creating a sense of stability and even identity to the Catholic Church after years of questioning and searching. His teaching was firm and unwavering on issues which seemed to be in doubt under his predecessor including the ordination of women, liberation theology and priestly celibacy. He virtually stopped the liberal laicisation of problem priests policy of Pope Paul VI, which inadvertently may have contributed to problems in the USA. His authoritative style was reminiscent of Pope Pius XII, whose teaching he repeated in his own words, such as the identity of the Catholic Church with the Body of Christ and his condemnations of capitalism "viruses": secularism, indifferentism, hedonistic consumerism, practical materialism, and also formal atheism.

As always after a long pontificate, a new page was opened in the history of the church with the election of a new pope. Pope Benedict XVI was elected in 2005. In his inaugural homily, the new Pontiff explained his view of a relation with Christ:

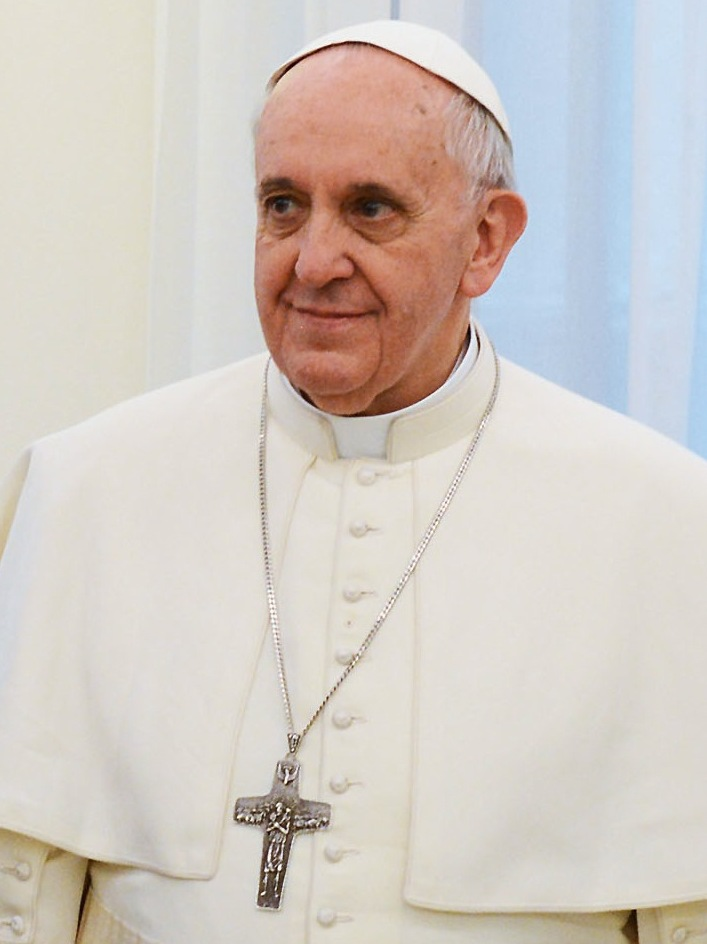
Pope Francis

Are we not perhaps all afraid in some way? If we let Christ enter fully into our lives, if we open ourselves totally to Him, are we not afraid that He might take something away from us? […] No! If we let Christ into our lives, we lose nothing, nothing, absolutely nothing of what makes life free, beautiful and great. No! Only in this friendship do we experience beauty and liberation […] When we give ourselves to Him, we receive a hundredfold in return. Yes, open, open wide the doors to Christ – and you will find true life.

On February 11, 2013, Pope Benedict XVI announced that he would tender his resignation on February 28, 2013, less than three weeks later. On March 13, 2013, Pope Francis—the first Jesuit pope and the first pope from the Americas—was elected to the papacy. After apparently recovering from a serious illness, he died following a stroke on April 21, 2025.

On May 8, 2025, an Augustinian and the first American was elected, with Peruvian citizenship, Pope Leo XIV.

== See also ==
- List of popes
- Papal States
- Papal Zouaves
- Index of Vatican City-related articles
