= Enrique Ernesto Shaw =

Argentinian businessman (1921–1962)

Venerable Enrique Ernesto Shaw KHS
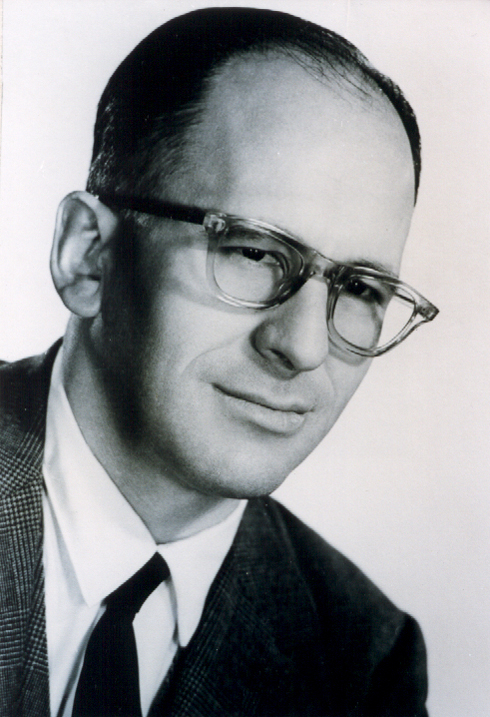
- Shaw circa 1952.
- Born: 26 February 1921; Paris, France
- Died: 27 August 1962 (aged 41); Buenos Aires, Argentina

Enrique Ernesto Shaw (26 February 1921 – 27 August 1962) was an Argentine Roman Catholic businessman. He was born in France and later emigrated to Argentina where he served in the marines. He promoted and encouraged business growth in accordance with the Catholic Church's social doctrine of the faith and he founded the Christian Association of Business Executives. He was also a prolific writer and published a range of books.

His cause of sainthood commenced in 2001 and he has been accorded the title Servant of God to recognize the commencement of the process.

== Life ==
Enrique Ernesto Shaw was born in 1921 in Paris as one of two children of Argentine parents, Alejandro Shaw and Sara Tornquist Altgelt; he was of both German and Scottish descent. The Shaws moved back to Argentina in 1923. Sara died in 1925.

Shaw served as a marine in Argentina and entered in 1936 despite the opposition of his father. He became a Junior Lieutenant. He started his business at the conclusion of World War II and established in 1952 the Christian Association of Business Executives with the assistance of Archbishop – later Cardinal – Joseph Cardijn. He became a prolific writer and he published a wide range of books. He was also among the founders of the Christian Family Movement and he also served as the president of the Argentine Catholic Action. He also established a pension fund and a health care plan to provide medical services and financial support in circumstances such as illness and new births.

In 1955 he became a victim of anti-Catholic persecution in the administration of Juan Peron. He was arrested and was seen as an altruistic prisoner as he provided fellow inmates with mattresses that relatives brought to him as well as food. In 1961 a firm he led was sold to an American trust fund that decided to fire over a thousand people. Shaw was opposed to this and proposed a plan to retain all workers.

One of his initiatives was the application of Catholic social doctrine in the workplace and he also paid attention to the social teachings of Pope Pius XII in 1946. At that same time he served in an organization for humanitarian aid for post-war Europe.

In 1943 he married Cecilia Bunge and the couple went on to have nine children; one became a priest. Shaw also taught his children the importance of rosaries and how to use them. He also took them to church each week.

In 1957 he fell ill with cancer. He took to writing during this time and also found time to speak at conferences. In mid 1962 he received a blood transfusion donated from his fellow workers. People at the hospital that Shaw was admitted to were perplexed as to the number of workers in line to donate blood. Shaw himself said before his death that he was pleased that the blood of his workers coursed through his veins. He – despite the risks – took a pilgrimage to Lourdes before his death.

Shaw was a member of the Order of the Knights of the Holy Sepulchre.

He died on 27 August 1962 in a hospital in Buenos Aires.

== Beatification process ==
On 12 September 1996 the promotion of his beatification cause came when Archbishop – later Cardinal – Jorge María Mejía invited the faithful to spread Shaw's message. The beatification process commenced on 25 September 2001 under Pope John Paul II in a process in Buenos Aires that conferred upon him the title Servant of God; the process opened in Argentina under Cardinal Jorge Mario Bergoglio – the future Pope Francis. The local process spanned from 25 August 2005 until 19 September 2013 and concluded in a Mass under Archbishop Mario Aurelio Poli. The process received formal ratification in 2015 in order for the cause to proceed to the next level. He was recognized for heroic virtue and elevated to the title "Venerable" by Pope Francis on 24 April 2021. After the investigation and study by the Dicastery for the Causes of Saints, Leo XIV, on 14 December 2025, approved the miracle.
