= Popes during the Age of Revolution =

The modern history of the papacy is shaped by the two largest dispossessions of papal property in its history, stemming from the French Revolution and its spread to Europe, including Italy.

== History ==
=== French Revolution ===
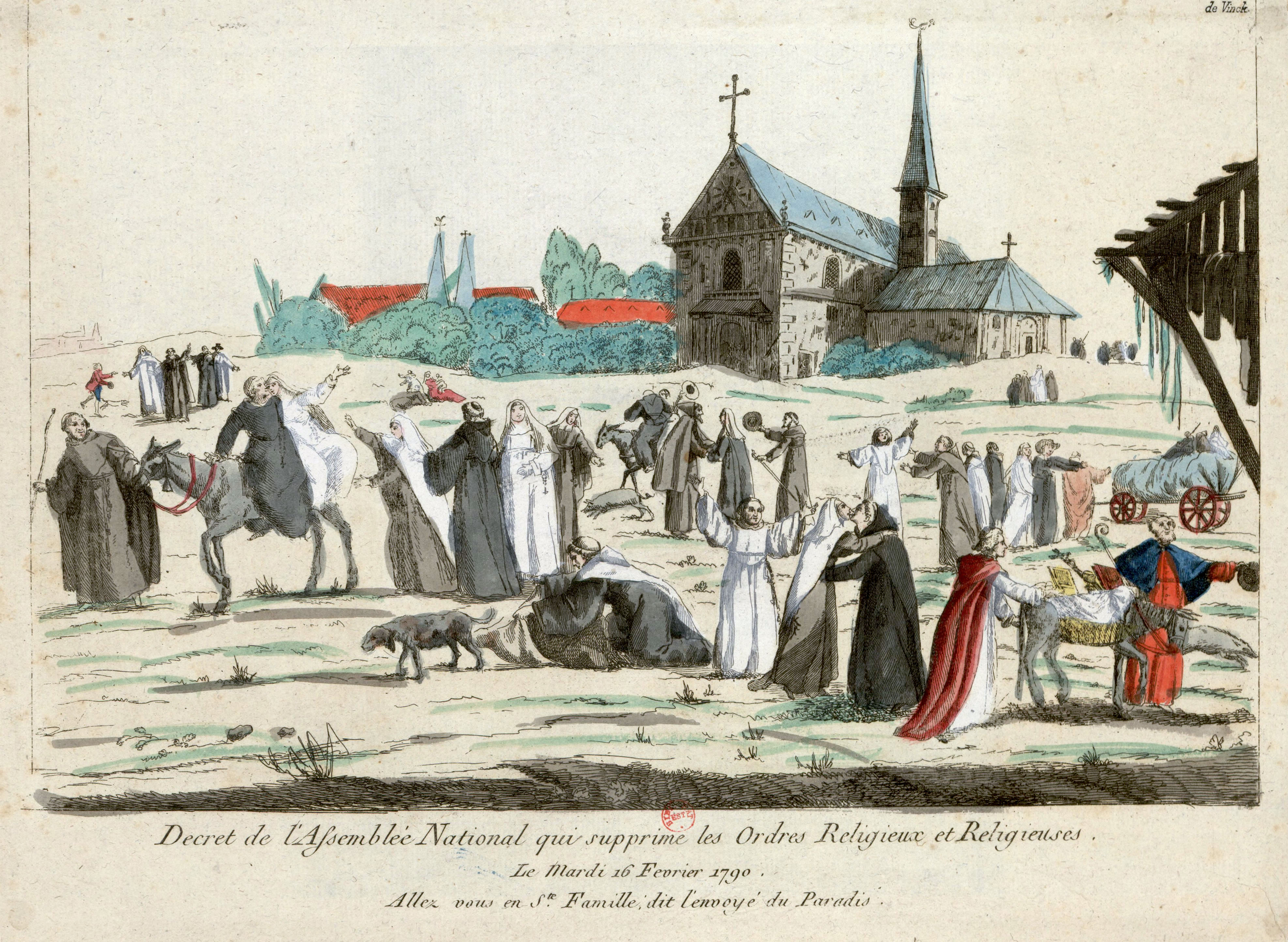
Period caricature, after the decree of 16 February 1790, monks and nuns enjoy their new freedom

In 1793, a French diplomat in Rome, Nicolas Jean Hugon de Bassville, indulged in a provocative display of the tricolour, symbol of French anti-clerical republicanism. A Roman crowd attacked him and he died the next day. Four years later, when Napoleon reached as far south as Ancona in an advance on Rome, this incident remained a specific grievance for which France held the pope responsible - demanding and receiving 300,000 livres as compensation for Basseville's family.

=== Napoleonic Italy ===
In 1797 French Republican troops under the command of Napoleon Bonaparte invaded Italy, defeated the papal troops and occupied Ancona and Loreto. Pius VI sued for peace. The price of persuading the French intruder to head north again, agreed in the Treaty of Tolentino, was a massive indemnity, the removal of many works of art from the Vatican collections and the surrender to France of Bologna, Ferrara and the Romagna.

However, on 28 December of that year, a popular French general was killed in a riot outside the French embassy in Rome, thus providing a new pretext furnished for invasion by the French. French army units marched to Rome, entered it unopposed on and, proclaiming a Roman Republic, demanded of the Pope the renunciation of his temporal authority. Upon his refusal to do so, Pius VI was taken prisoner, and on February 20 was ultimately brought to the citadel of Valence in France where he died.

The new pope, Pope Pius VII, was at first conciliatory towards Napoleon. He negotiated the French Concordat of 1801 which reaffirmed the Roman Catholic Church as the major religion of France and restored some of its civil status, removing it from the authority of the Pope. While the Concordat restored some ties between France and the papacy, the agreement, especially as supplemented by the "Organic Articles" that Napoleon unilaterally promulgated after signing the Concordat, was slanted largely in favor of the state; the balance of church-state relations had tilted firmly in Napoleon Bonaparte's favor.

In 1804, Pius VII traveled to Paris to officiate at Napoleon's imperial coronation. On December 2, Napoleon crowned himself Emperor of the French in the Cathedral of Notre Dame, Paris, in the presence of Pope Pius VII. Claims that he seized the crown out of the hands of Pope Pius VII during the ceremony in order to avoid subjecting himself to the authority of the pontiff are apocryphal; in fact, the coronation procedure had been agreed upon in advance.

But by 1808 relations had deteriorated. The pope annoyed Napoleon by refusing to sanction the annulment of his brother Jerome's marriage and, perhaps more significantly, by not bringing the ports of the Papal States into the Continental System.

=== French-occupied Rome ===
The result was that a French army occupied Rome in February 1808. In the following month another section of the papal states (the Marches) was annexed to the Napoleonic kingdom of Italy. Napoleon followed up these affronts by annexing in 1809 all that remains of the papal states, including the city of Rome, and by announcing that the pope no longer has any form of temporal authority. Pius VII responded by an immediate use of his spiritual authority, excommunicating Napoleon himself, albeit not by name, and everyone else connected with the annexation. Pius VII was soon thereafter arrested by French General Etienne Radet, acting on letters from Napoleon to his commanders in Italy ambiguously expressing consternation over the Pope's recalcitrance. The Pope would remain a prisoner of the French until February 1814.

These are the events which brought the entire Italian peninsula under French control by 1809. The situation remained unchanged until after Napoleon's defeat at Leipzig in 1813 – an event followed by Austrian recovery of much of Italy and a subsequent seal of approval at the congress of Vienna.

=== Roman Republic ===
During the reigns of Pope Leo XII (1823–9) and Pope Gregory XVI (1831–46), Rome became strongly identified with the anti-liberal sentiments of most of the ruling European houses of the day. The election of Pope Pius IX in 1846 seemed to promise a less reactionary papacy. However, in 1848, nationalist and liberal revolutions began to break out across Europe; in 1849, a Roman Republic was declared and the Pope fled the city. Louis Napoleon Bonaparte, recently elected president of the newly declared French Second Republic, saw an opportunity to assuage conservative Catholic opinion in France, and in cooperation with Austria sent troops to restore Papal rule in Rome. After some hard fighting, Pius was returned to Rome by a victorious French army, and repenting of his previous liberal tendencies pursued a harsh, conservative policy even more repressive than that of his predecessors.

Even before the Franco-Prussian War, Pius IX had foreseen the temporal power of the Church draining away and had begun redefining the Catholic Church as a spiritual power that would serve as a firm bulwark against the liberal trends of the period.

== Theology ==
The First Vatican Council established clear theoretical underpinnings to Pius IX's commitment to an intensified centralization of ecclesiastical government in Rome. The council's companion definition of papal infallibility strengthened the energetic exercise of the papal magisterial power that was so marked a feature of the years between the first and second Vatican Councils. The pope's primary purpose was to obtain confirmation of the position he had taken in his Syllabus of Errors (1864), condemning a wide range of positions associated with rationalism, liberalism, and materialism, and to define the doctrine concerning the church. In the three sessions, there was discussion and approval of only two constitutions: Dei Filius, the Dogmatic Constitution On The Catholic Faith and Pastor Aeternus, the First Dogmatic Constitution on the Church of Christ, dealing with the primacy and infallibility of the bishop of Rome when solemnly defining dogma.

Seven months later, on 18 July 1870, the prelates assembled in St Peter's accepted an uncompromising dogma - that the pope, when speaking from his throne on a matter of faith or morals, is inspired by God and is therefore infallible. Papal infallibility was merely the most striking example of the authoritarian stance now being established. It must be said that most of the dissenting bishops had left Rome before the final vote. The direction in which Pius IX was taking the church was made very plain in a document of 1864 known simply as the Syllabus. It is a list of eighty modern errors that included such broad topics as socialism, civil marriage and secular education. The final error is the concept that 'the Roman Pontiff can and should reconcile himself to and agree with progress, liberalism and modern civilization'.

== Sources ==
- Chadwick, Owen (1981). The Popes and European Revolution. Oxford University Press.
- Hales, E. E. Y. (1960). Revolution and Papacy. Doubleday & Co.
- Hutton, William Holden (1908). The age of revolution: being an outline of the history of the church from 1648-1815.
- Matsumoto-Best, Saho (2003). Britain and the Papacy in the Age of Revolution 1846-1851. Royal Historical Society.
- Pollard, John F. (2005). Money and the Rise of the Modern Papacy: Financing the Vatican, 1850–1950. ISBN 0-521-81204-6.
