= Perugia Papacy =

13th-century papal residence

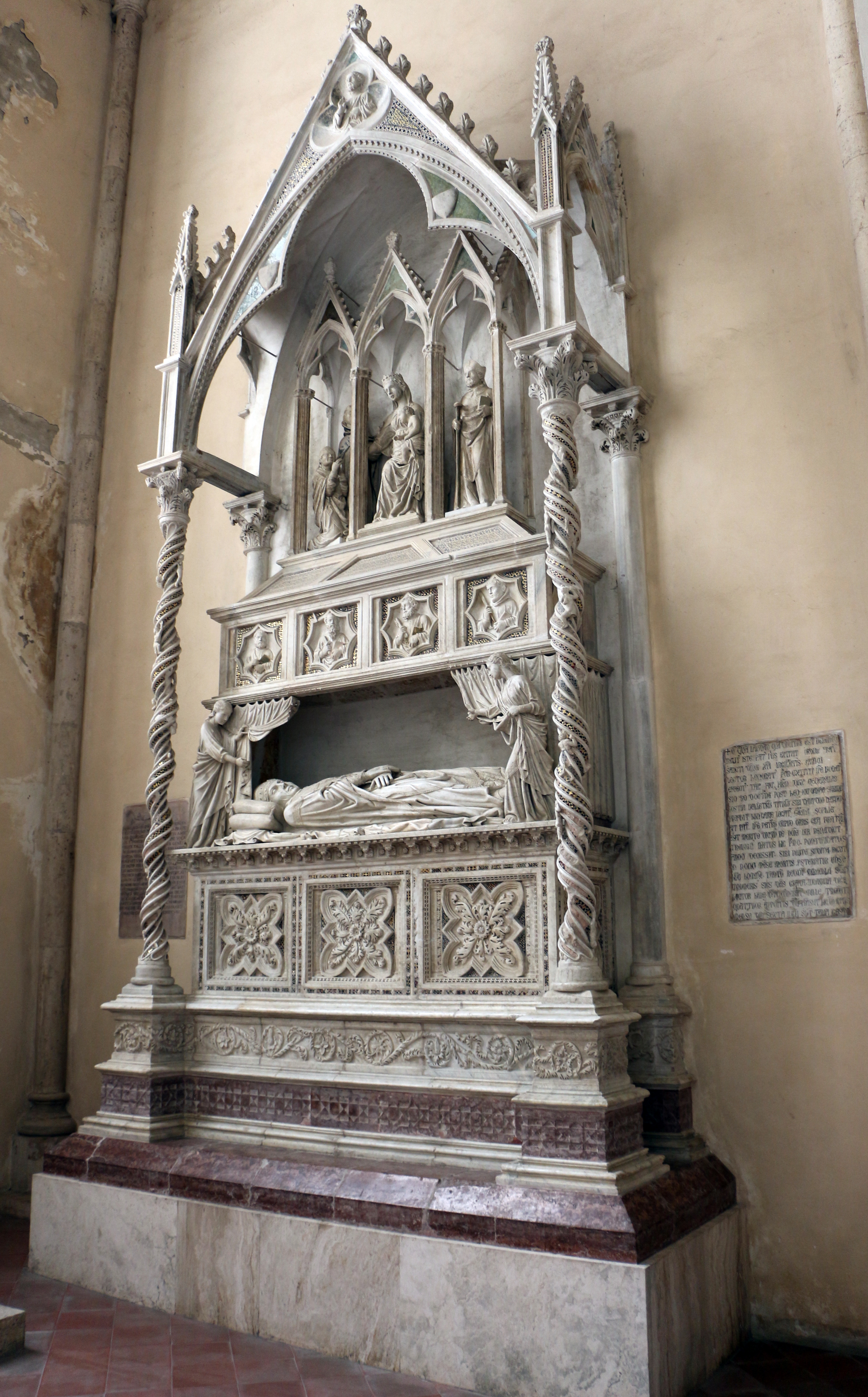
The tomb of Pope Benedict XI in Perugia

Perugia was a long-time papal residence during the 13th century. Five popes were elected here: Pope Honorius III (1216–1227), Pope Clement IV (1265–1268), Pope Honorius IV (1285–1287), Pope Celestine V (1294), and Pope Clement V (1305–1314). These elections took place in the Palazzo delle Canoniche adjoining the Perugia Cathedral.

The Cathedral contained the tombs of Pope Innocent III (1198–1216), Pope Urban IV (1261–1264), and Pope Martin IV (1281–1285). These were destroyed by Gérard du Puy, the cardinal-nephew of Pope Gregory XI (1370–1378).

During du Puy's tenure as papal governor during the War of the Eight Saints he pillaged the Duomo construction site for materials for his private fortress. According to Heywood, due to du Puy's construction, "so certain did it appear that the Papal Curia was about to be transferred to Perugia that foreign merchants began to negotiate for the hire of shops and warehouses in the city." The tomb of Pope Benedict XI (1303–1304) is still extant in S. Domenico.

== Overview ==
At least five popes spent significant periods of residence in Perugia.

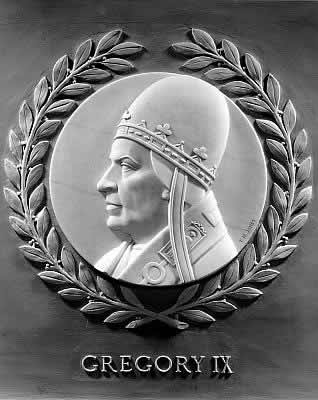
Pope Gregory IX (1227-1241) lived in Perugia from June 1228-February 1230 and 1234-December 1236.

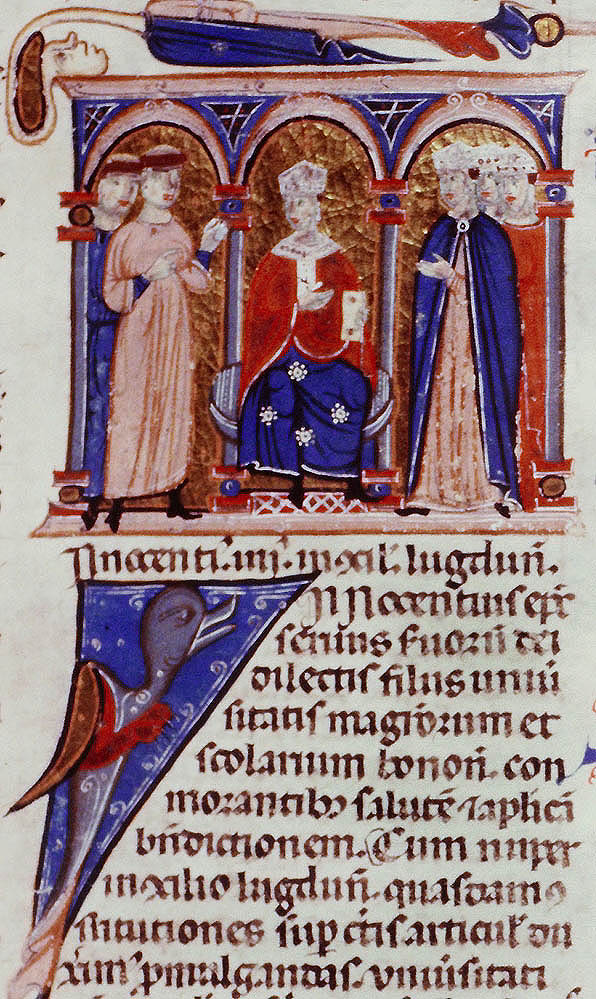
Pope Innocent IV (1243-1254) lived in Perugia from November 1251 – 1253.

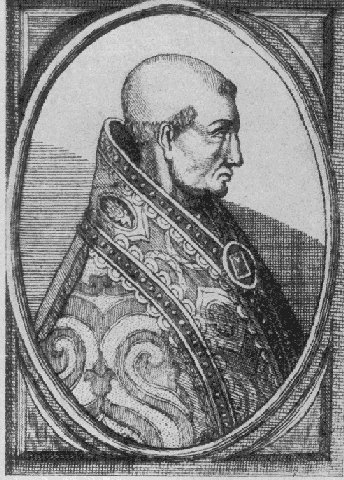
Pope Urban IV (1261-1264) lived in Perugia in 1264 until his death.

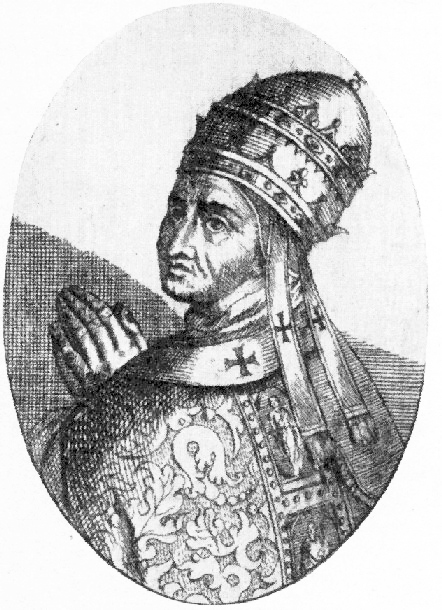
Pope Benedict XI (1303-1304) lived in Perugia until his death in July 1304.

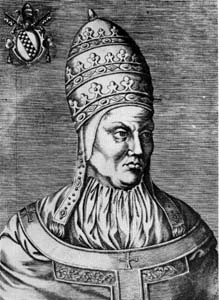
Pope Boniface IX (1389-1404) lived in Perugia from September 1392 until July 1393

== Background ==
Pope Zacharias convinced Lombard King Ratchis to abandon his siege of the city in 749. The city was also included in the "Donation of Pepin", and thus added to the Papal States.

== History as a papal residence ==
=== Innocent III ===
Pope Innocent III (1198–1216) was in Perugia in September 1198 to consecrate S. Lorenzo; by October, he had left for Todi. Innocent III died in Perugia in 1216, where the cardinals gathered to elect Honorius III.

=== Gregory IX ===
According to Heywood,

"During their relentless persecution of the second Frederick, the popes, and especially Gregory IX, were often resident in Perugia. There they were able to mature their ambitious schemes in safety; while the city that sheltered and protected them reaped a rich reward for its loyalty in praise and privileges. Thither, in June, 1228, came Gregory, driven from Rome by a Ghibelline revolt; and thence he directed the invasion of the Kingdom of Naples. He was still in Perugia when, in May, 1229, Frederick landed at Brindisi, and, unfurling the Banner of the Cross against the Banner of the Keys, repelled and defeated the conquering armies of the Church. Only in February, 1230, did the pope return to Rome, and, in 1234, he was again in Perugia, where he remained until December, 1236."

According to Heywood, Perugia "virtually assumed the position of Papal Vicar in Umbria." The two apparently had a falling-out by the time of Martin IV, who excommunicated the entire city of Perugia for disobeying his order not to exact vengeance upon the Bishopric of Foligno, and he and his cardinals were burned in effigy in Perugia.

=== Innocent IV ===
After the death of Frederick II, Pope Innocent IV (1243–1254) returned to Italy and reached Perugia in November 1251. He did not resume his journey towards Rome until 1253, when he was summoned by Senator Brancaleone. According to Heywood,

"During his residence in Perugia, he did all in his power to prove his gratitude for her unwavering loyalty, and, in a Privilege of the 3rd of October, 1252, which was addressed to the Bishop of the city and which is still preserved among the municipal archives, he recalls the exceeding great affliction and labor which she had endured 'pro fidei puritate atque devotionis sinceritate servanda erga Romanam Ecclesiam matrem suam.' Moreover, during those prosperous years, Perugia reasserted her authority over many towns which through fear of the Emperor she had permitted to throw off their allegiance."

=== Urban IV ===
Pope Urban IV (1261–1264) lived in Perugia in 1264, while fleeing with his Curia from Pietro Di Vico, who was planning to ambush him in Orvieto. Urban Iv remained in Perugia until his death.

=== Benedict XI ===
Pope Benedict XI (1303–1304) took refuge in Perugia upon his election where he died in July 1304, triggering an eleven-month election in the "Palazzo del Papa." Pope Clement V (1305–1314) was elected, who moved the papacy to Avignon, causing the Avignon Papacy.

=== Boniface IX ===
Pope Boniface IX (1389–1404) lived in Perugia from September 1392 until 1393 during the Western Schism. His legate, Pileo, the archbishop of Ravenna, had been guarding the citadel and the city in his absence. While in the city, Boniface IX recalled the Guelphic exiles and achieved a military victory against Giovanni Sciarra da Vico. One of these exiles was murdered in the streets in July 1393 and Pandolfo de' Baglioni, a noble, interfered with the Podesta's ability to hand down a sentence; in retaliation, an angry mob killed Pandolfo and much of his family. As the city erupted in violence, the pope and his aides fled to Assisi.

== Papal Palace ==
A portion of the Canonica (rectory), which had previously been "invaded" by the civic magistrates, was occupied by the popes, and later became known as the Palazzo del Papa; it was later used as the residence of the papal governor (Palazzo del Governatore). The Canonica was connected to the Bishop's Palace by massive arches which now comprise the Via delle Volte. The Great Hall was capable of seating 600 persons. The palace, then the residence of the papal governor, burned to the ground in 1534. Pope Pius IV (1559-1565) granted the site and the remains to Cardinal Fulvio della Corgna.

The Piazza della Paglia was renamed Piazza del Papa in 1816, when a statute of Pope Julius III (1550–1555) was moved there.

== Later papal relations ==
In 1375, Perugia was one of the first cities to join Florence in rebellion against Gregory XI in the War of the Eight Saints. Pope Boniface IX (1389–1404) reclaimed the city in 1403. In 1416, Pope Martin V (1417–1431) recognized Braccio da Montone as lord of Perugia. Pope Julius II (1503–1513) conquered Gian Paolo Baglione in the city in 1506, and Pope Leo X (1513–1521) ordered him decapitated in 1520. Thereafter, Perugia was again an immediate dependency of the Holy See. The city rebelled against Pope Paul III's (1534–1549) salt tax in 1540. Pierluigi Farnese suppressed the rebellion for Paul III, who built a fortress in the city. Pope Julius III (1550–1555) restored many of the cities privileges thereafter. When the Perugians rebelled again in 1848 they demolished Paul III's tower. Pontifical troops retook the city again in 1859.

Pope Leo XIII (1878–1903), a former bishop of Perugia, made the see an archdiocese upon his election.
