= Social teachings of Pope Pius XII =

1939–1958 non-theological teachings

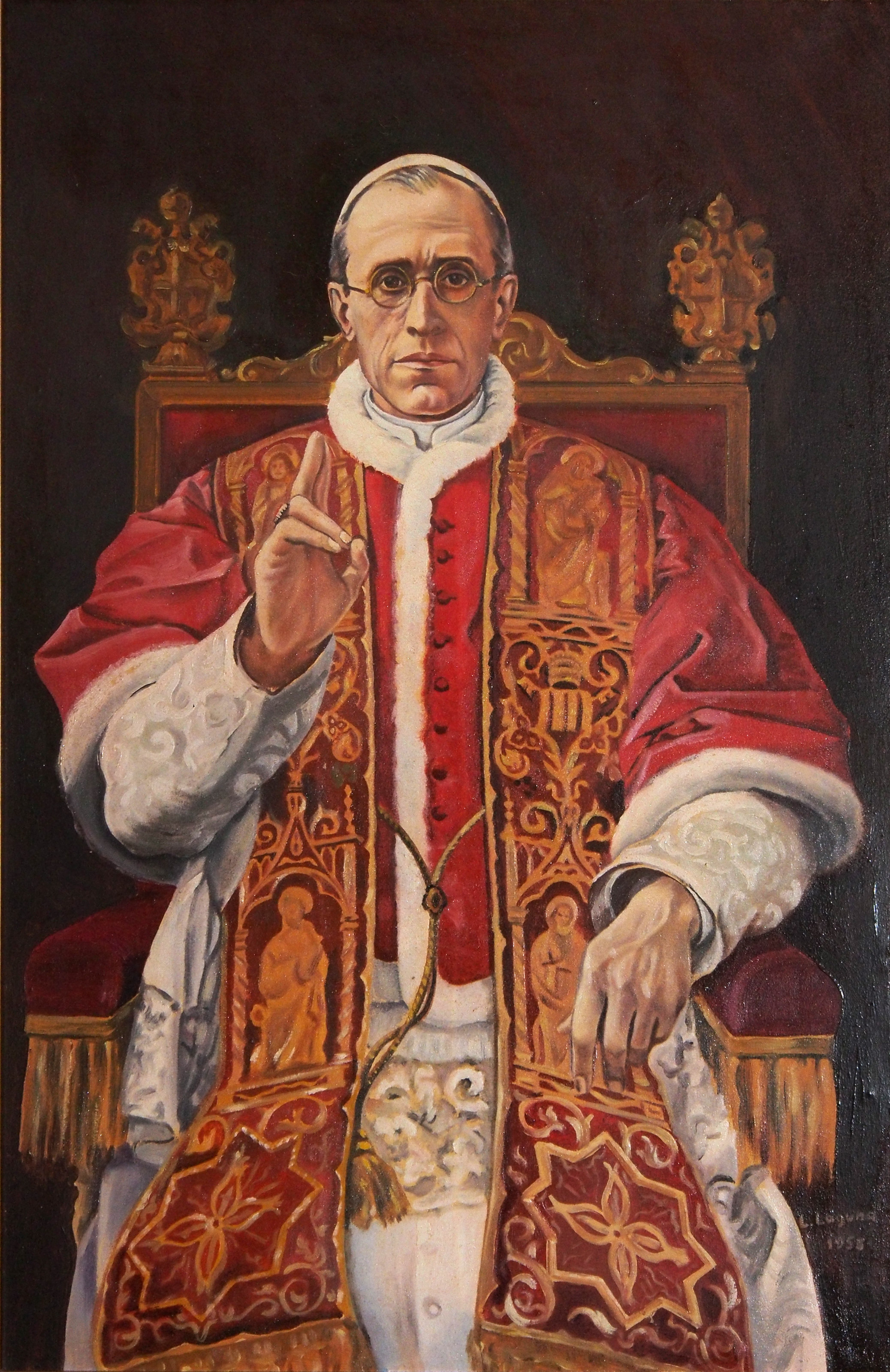
Portrait of Pius XII, 1958

Social teachings of Pope Pius XII refers to encyclicals, apostolic constitutions and speeches by Pope Pius XII on non-theological issues involving medicine, science, education, social justice, family and sexuality, and occupations.

== Social teachings ==
=== Medical theology ===
Pius XII delivered numerous speeches to medical professionals and researchers. Pio XII, Discorsi Ai Medici compiles 700 pages of specific addresses. Pope Pius XII addressed doctors, nurses, midwives, to detail all aspects of rights and dignity of patients, medical responsibilities, moral implications of psychological illnesses and the uses of psycho pharmaca, but also issues of uses of medicine in terminally ill persons, medical lies in face of grave illness, and the rights of family members to make decisions against expert medical advice. Pope Pius XII went often new ways, thus he was the first to determine that the use of pain medicine in terminally ill patients is justified, even if this may shorten the life of the patient, as long as life shortening is not the objective itself.

Other topics were the behaviour of medical doctors, facing pain and death, sterilisation, genetics, artificial insemination, painless child birth, the multiple moral aspects of developing medical technologies, morality in applied psychology, moral limits to medical research and treatment, and cancer treatment of children, and more.

=== Sexuality and conscience ===
Pope Pius XII fully accepted the rhythm method as a moral form of family planning, although only in limited circumstances, within the context of family. Some Catholics interpreted the 1930 encyclical Casti connubii by Pope Pius XI to allow moral use of the rhythm method, and internal rulings of the Catholic Church in 1853 and 1880 stated that periodic abstinence was a moral way to avoid pregnancy. Some historians consider these two speeches by Pius XII to be the first explicit Church acceptance of the method.

In his speech to mid-wives, Pope Pius XII offered this understanding of sexual pleasures: "The Creator himself... established that in the [generative] function, spouses should experience pleasure and enjoyment of body and spirit. Therefore, the spouses do nothing evil in seeking this pleasure and enjoyment. They accept what the Creator has intended for them. At the same time, spouses should know how to keep themselves within the limits of just moderation."

To Pius XII, "The conscience is the innermost and most secret nucleus of man. There he withdraws with his intellectual capacities into complete separation, alone with himself or better, alone with God, whose voice echoes in his conscience. There he decides over good or bad. There chooses between victory or defeat. The conscience is therefore, to use an old, venerable picture, a sanctuary, on whose entrance all must stop." This respect applies to children and even more to adults: "It is correctly argued, that the true meaning of adult independence is not to be led like a little Child."

Vatican II picked up this quote on conscience from Pius XII verbatim in Gaudium et Spes, and concluded: "By conscience, in a wonderful way, that law is recognized, which is fulfilled in the love of God and neighbour." Since 1993, the Magisterium of the Church explicitly highlights this particular view of Pope Pius XII, quoting it as an element of the official Catholic Catechism.

The Catholic Church's modern view on family planning was further developed in the 1968 encyclical Humanae Vitae by Pope Paul VI and in Pope John Paul II's Theology of the Body.

=== Theology and Science ===
To Pius XII, science and religion were heavenly sisters, different manifestations of divine exactness, that could not possibly contradict each other over the long term Regarding their relation, his advisor Professor Robert Leiber wrote: "Pius XII was very careful not to close any doors prematurely. He was energetic on this point and regretted that in the case of Galileo." Anticipating similar praises from Pope John Paul II in 1992, Pius XII, in his first speech (1939) to the Pontifical Academy of Sciences, included Galileo among the "most audacious heroes of research… not afraid of the stumbling blocks and the risks on the way, nor fearful of the funereal monuments."

Pius XII took a close interest in the proceedings of the Pontifical Academy of Sciences, created by his immediate predecessor, Pius XI, and addressed its sessions on a number of occasions. The scientific stature of the Academy in Pius's day was unimpeachable: Bohr, Planck, and Schrödinger were members, by virtue of having been appointed by Pius XI. De Broglie and Heisenberg were admitted in 1955. The chemist Bernard Pullman devoted part of his book on the history of atomism to Pius's close interest in the quantum mechanics and atomic physics that emerged during Pius's lifetime:

"Among all 20th century popes, Pius XII was the one who dealt most extensively with the issue of atomism, particularly with the scientific and philosophical questions raised by the advent of quantum mechanics, questions that could not have left the Church indifferent. [His] two speeches to the Pontifical Academy... are lengthy and marvelously prepared dissertations that attest to the detailed knowledge the Pontiff had of the subject matter. Reading them is not unlike attending a magisterial lecture, as they constitute genuine updates on the state of knowledge at the time."

Pullman goes on to cite a speech, dated 21 February 1943, as evidence that Pius was even aware of the emerging possibility of nuclear weapons.

It is especially notable that Georges Lemaître, who was at once a Roman Catholic priest, a cosmologist, and a student of Eddington, and the first to propose the now canonical Big Bang scenario for the origin of the universe, was also a member of the Pontifical Academy during Pius's day. Thanks to Lemaitre, Pius XII was well-informed about the rise of modern physical cosmology. Commenting on "the state and nature of original matter," Pius acknowledged that science declares this to be an "insoluble enigma" but continues, that “it seems that science of today, by going back in one leap millions of centuries, has succeeded in being witness to that primordial Fiat Lux when, out of nothing, there burst forth with matter a sea of light and radiation, while the particles of chemical elements split and reunited in million of galaxies" Pius went on to say that these facts need further investigation, and theories founded upon them need “new developments and proofs in order to offer a secure basis for reasoning.”

=== Evolution ===
In 1950, Pius XII promulgated Humani generis which acknowledged that evolution might accurately describe the biological origins of human life, but at the same time criticized those who use it as a religion, who "imprudently and indiscreetly hold that evolution... explains the origin of all things". While Humani generis was significant as the first occasion on which a pope explicitly addressed the topic of evolution at length, it did not represent a change in doctrine for the Roman Catholic Church. As early as 1868, Cardinal John Henry Newman wrote, "the theory of Darwin, true or not, is not necessarily atheistic; on the contrary, it may simply be suggesting a larger idea of divine providence and skill." The encyclical issues a clear no to another scientific opinion popular at the time, polygenism, "the scientific hypothesis that mankind descended from a group of original humans."
