= Aphrodite =

Ancient Greek goddess of love

- Goddess of love, lust, passion, pleasure, beauty, and sexuality
- Member of the twelve Olympians
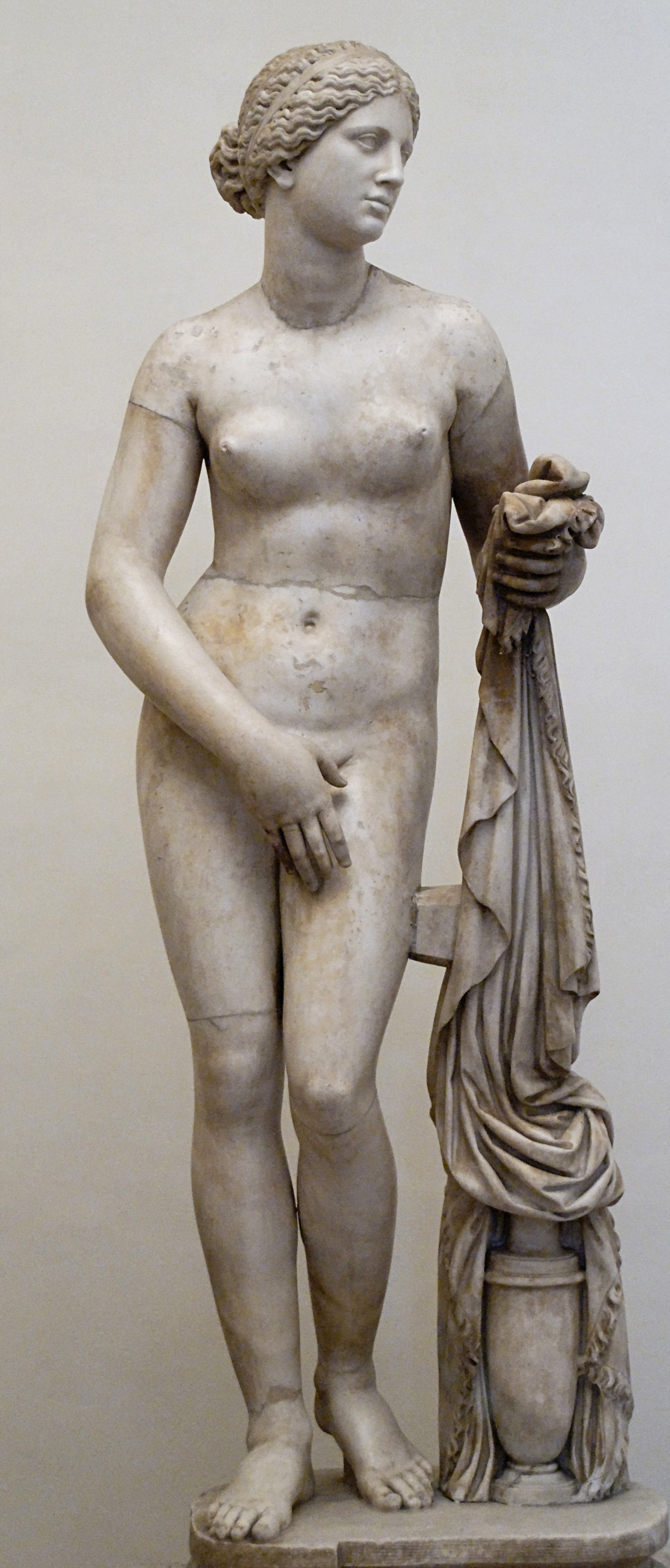
- A Roman marble copy of the Aphrodite of Knidos. The head, arms, legs and drapery support have been restored.
- Abode: Mount Olympus
- Planet: Venus
- Animals: Dolphin, sparrow, dove, swan, hare, goose, bee, fish, butterfly
- Symbol: Rose, seashell, pearl, mirror, girdle, anemone, lettuce
- Tree: Myrrh, myrtle, apple, pomegranate
- Parents: Zeus and Dione (Homer); Foam from Uranus's genitals (Hesiod)
- Consort: Hephaestus or Ares

Equivalents
- Roman: Venus

Aphrodite (/ˌæfrəˈdaɪtiː/) (Note: Ancient Greek: Ἀφροδίτη, romanized: Aphrodítē; Attic Greek pronunciation: [a.pʰro.dǐː.tɛː], Koine Greek: [a.ɸroˈdi.te̝], Modern Greek: [a.froˈði.ti]) is an ancient Greek goddess associated with love and beauty. Aphrodite's main cult centers were Cythera, Cyprus, Corinth, and Athens. In Athens, she was celebrated annually during the Aphrodisia festival. In Laconia, Aphrodite was worshipped as a warrior goddess. She was the patron goddess of prostitutes, an association which led early scholars to propose the concept of sacred prostitution in Greco-Roman culture, an idea now generally seen as erroneous. Aphrodite had many epithets, many of which emphasized an aspect of her character or were used by local cults. Thus she was known as Cytherea (Lady of Cythera) and Cypris (Lady of Cyprus), because both places claimed to be the site of her birth. The origins of Aphrodite have been the subject of scholarly debate. Proposed influences on her origins have included Near Eastern love goddesses, an indigenous Cypriot goddess, and a Proto-Indo-European dawn goddess.

In Homer's Iliad, she is the daughter of Zeus and Dione. In Hesiod's Theogony she is born from the foam (ἀφρός, aphrós) produced by Uranus's genitals, which his son Cronus had severed and thrown into the sea. In the Odyssey, Aphrodite was married to Hephaestus, the god of fire, blacksmiths and metalworking; she fornicates with Ares, the god of war, and is caught by her husband. In other sources, Ares is described as her consort. In the First Homeric Hymn to Aphrodite, she seduces the mortal shepherd Anchises after Zeus made her fall in love with him. Aphrodite was the surrogate mother and lover of the mortal shepherd Adonis, who was killed by a wild boar. Along with Athena and Hera, she was one of the three goddesses whose feud resulted in the Trojan War; she plays a major role throughout the Iliad. Sappho's Ode to Aphrodite is one of the earliest poems dedicated to the goddess and survives from the Archaic period nearly complete. In his Symposium, Plato distinguishes between Aphrodite Urania, a transcendent "heavenly" Aphrodite, and Aphrodite Pandemos, who is common to "all the people".

The Romans identified Aphrodite with their goddess Venus. Aphrodite has been featured in Western art as a symbol of female beauty and has appeared in numerous works of Western literature.

== Etymology ==
Hesiod derives the name Aphrodite from aphrós (ἀφρός) 'sea-foam', interpreting the name as "risen from the foam", but most modern scholars regard this as a spurious folk etymology. Early-modern scholars of classical mythology attempted to argue that Aphrodite's name was of Greek or Indo-European origin, but these efforts have mostly been abandoned. Aphrodite's name is generally accepted to likely be of Semitic origin, due to the believed Near Eastern origins of Aphrodite's worship, but its exact derivation cannot be determined with confidence. Some scholars, such as Fritz Hommel, have suggested that Aphrodite's name is a hellenized pronunciation of the name "Astarte"; other scholars, however, reject this as linguistically untenable. Martin West reconstructs a Cyprian Canaanite form of the name as either *ʿAprodît or *ʿAproḏît, and cautiously suggests the latter as being an epithet with the meaning "She of the Villages". Aren Wilson-Wright suggests the Phoenician form *ʾAprodīt as an elative epithet meaning "unique, excellent, sublime".

Scholars in the late-nineteenth and early-twentieth centuries, accepting Hesiod's "foam" etymology as genuine, analyzed the second part of Aphrodite's name as *-odítē "wanderer" or as *-dítē "bright". More recently, Michael Janda, accepting Hesiod's etymology, argues for the second interpretation, and claims the story of a birth from the foam as an Indo-European mytheme. Similarly, Krzysztof Tomasz Witczak proposes an Indo-European compound *abʰor- "very" and *dʰei- "to shine", also referring to Eos, and Daniel Kölligan has interpreted Aphrodite's name as "shining up from the mist/foam". Other scholars have argued that these hypotheses are unlikely, since Aphrodite's attributes are unlike those of both Eos and the Vedic deity Ushas.

Some non-Greek etymologies have been suggested. One Semitic etymology compares Aphrodite to the Assyrian barīrītu, the name of a female demon that appears in Middle Babylonian and Late Babylonian texts. Hammarström looks to Etruscan, comparing (e)prθni "lord", an Etruscan honorific loaned into Greek as πρύτανις. This would make the theonym in origin an honorific, "the lady". Most scholars reject this as implausible, especially since Aphrodite's name actually appears in Etruscan in the borrowed form Apru (from Greek Aphrō, a clipped form of Aphrodite).

In the Cypriot syllabary, a script used on Cyprus from the eleventh to the fourth centuries BC, Aphrodite's name is attested in the forms 𐠀𐠡𐠦𐠭𐠃𐠂 (a-po-ro-ta-o-i, read right-to-left), 𐠀𐠡𐠦𐠯𐠭𐠂 (a-po-ro-ti-ta-i), and finally 𐠀𐠡𐠦𐠯𐠪𐠈 (a-po-ro-ti-si-jo, "Aphrodisian", "related to Aphrodite", in the context of a month).

== Origins ==
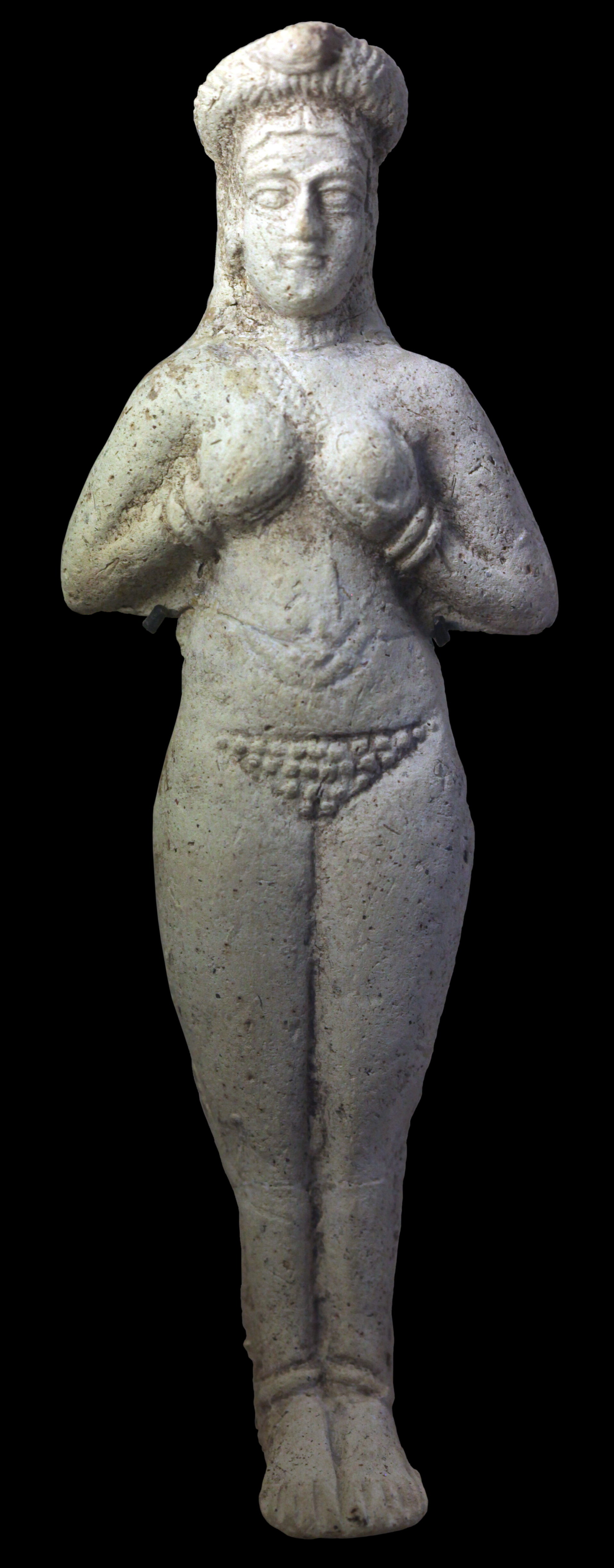
Late second-millennium BC nude of Ishtar from Susa, crowned and clutching her breasts

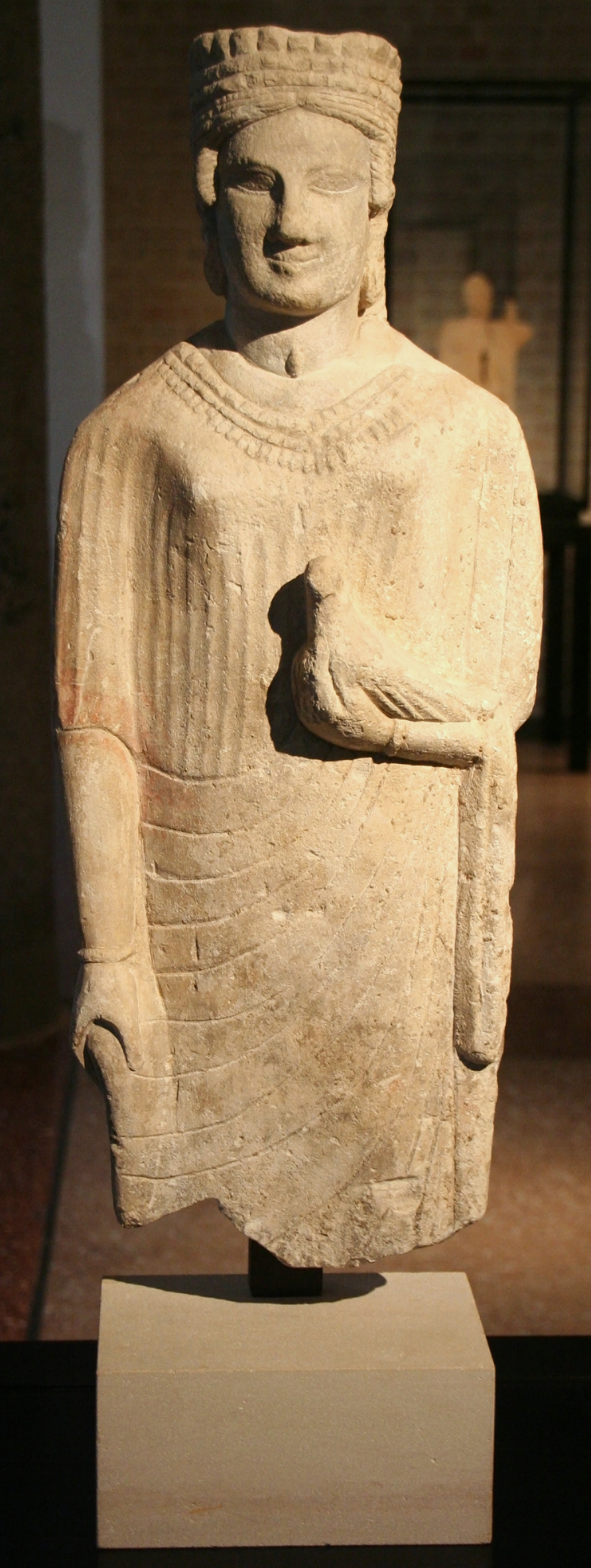
Early fifth-century BC Aphrodite from Cyprus, with cylinder crown and dove

The origins of the Greek Aphrodite have been extensively debated by scholars, leading to multiple theories concerning where and when the goddess originated.

Some scholars believe that the cult of Aphrodite in Greece was influenced by the cult of Astarte in Phoenicia, which, in turn, was influenced by the cult of the Mesopotamian goddess known as "Ishtar" to the East Semitic peoples and as "Inanna" to the Sumerians. Pausanias states that the first to establish a cult of Aphrodite were the Assyrians, followed by the Paphians of Cyprus and then the Phoenicians at Ascalon. The Phoenicians, in turn, taught her worship to the people of Cythera. According to this view, Aphrodite took on Inanna-Ishtar's associations with sexuality and procreation. Furthermore, she was known as Ourania (Οὐρανία), which means "heavenly", a title corresponding to Inanna's role as the Queen of Heaven. Early artistic and literary portrayals of Aphrodite are extremely similar on Inanna-Ishtar. Like Inanna-Ishtar, Aphrodite was a warrior goddess; the second-century AD Greek geographer Pausanias records that, in Sparta, Aphrodite was worshipped as Aphrodite Areia, which means "warlike". He mentions that Aphrodite's most ancient cult statues in Sparta and on Cythera showed her bearing arms. Modern scholars note that Aphrodite's warrior-goddess aspects appear in the oldest strata of her worship and see it as an indication of her Near Eastern origins. Nineteenth-century classical scholars disliked the idea that ancient Greek religion was influenced by the cultures of the Near East, but even Friedrich Gottlieb Welcker, who argued that Near Eastern influence on Greek culture was largely confined to material culture, agreed that Aphrodite was clearly of Phoenician origin. The influence of Near Eastern culture on early Greek religion in general, and on the cult of Aphrodite in particular, is thought by the theory's proponents to date from a period of orientalization during the eighth century BC, when archaic Greece was on the fringes of the Neo-Assyrian Empire.

Some early comparative mythologists opposed to the idea of a Near Eastern origin argued that Aphrodite originated as an aspect of the Greek dawn goddess Eos and that she was therefore ultimately derived from the Proto-Indo-European dawn goddess *H_{a}éusōs (properly Greek Eos, Latin Aurora, Sanskrit Ushas). Most modern scholars have now rejected the notion of a purely Indo-European Aphrodite, but it is possible that Aphrodite, who may have originated as an Semitic deity, was influenced by the Indo-European dawn goddess. Both Aphrodite and Eos were known for their erotic beauty and aggressive sexuality, and for their relationships with mortal lovers. Both were associated with the colours red, white, and gold. Michael Janda interprets Aphrodite's name as an epithet of Eos meaning "she who rises from the [ocean] foam" and points to Hesiod's account in the Theogony of Aphrodite's birth as an archaic reflex of Indo-European myth. Aphrodite rising out of the waters after Cronus defeats Uranus as a mytheme would then be directly cognate to the Rigvedic myth of Indra defeating Vrtra, liberating Ushas. Another key similarity between Aphrodite and the Indo-European dawn goddess is her close kinship to the Greek sky deity, since both of the main claimants to her paternity (Zeus and Uranus) are sky deities.

Stephanie L. Budin and Jacqueline Karageorghis argue for the importance of Cyprus's role in the goddess's origins. Vinciane Pirenne-Delforge writes that an oriental origin remained uncertain, with the ancient views of Herodotus and Pausanias depending on "the imaginative register" and a theorised process of cultural borrowing which in her view "will remain forever beyond our scope".

Map of Aphrodite's origins. Scholars have proposed Near Eastern, Cyprus, and Indo-European theories.

== Forms and epithets ==
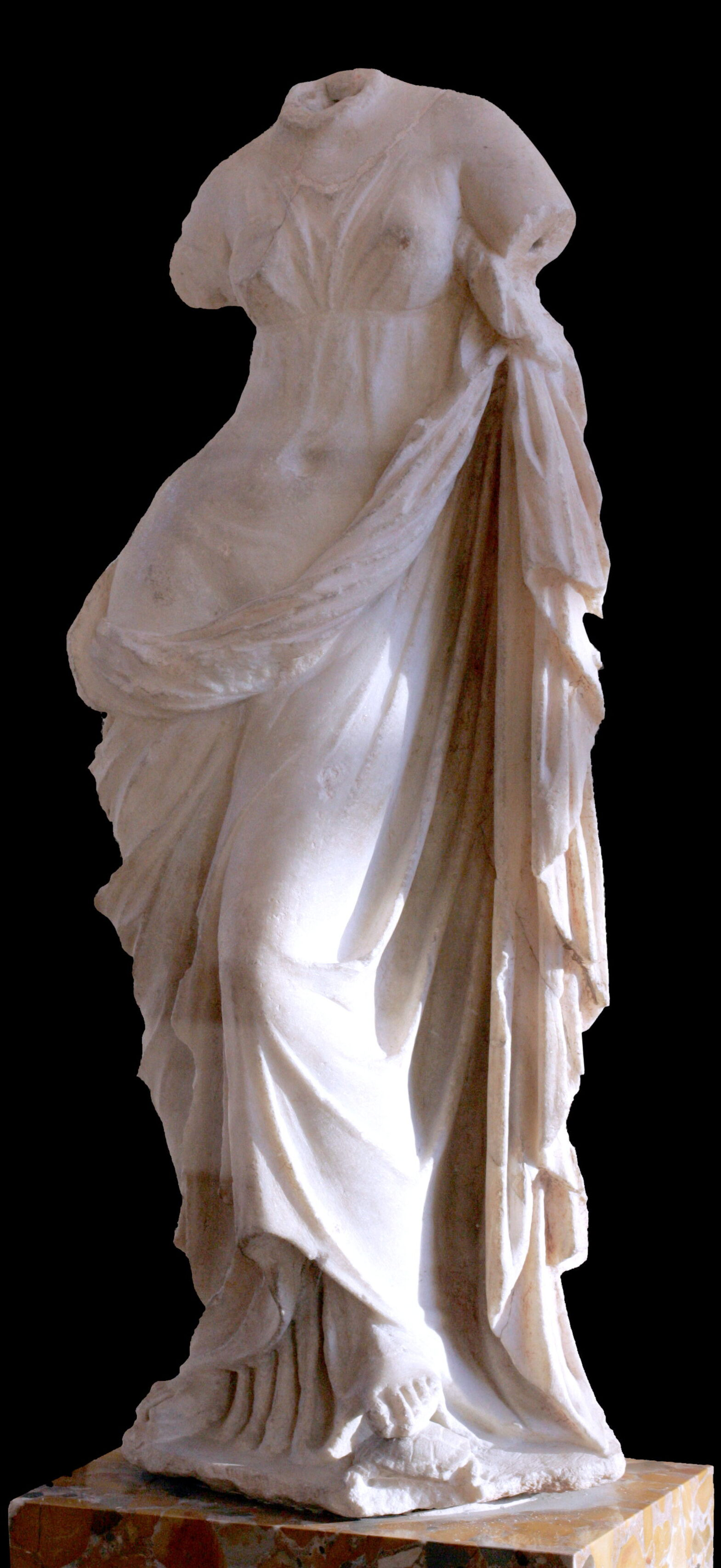
Aphrodite Ourania, draped, her foot resting on a tortoise (Louvre)

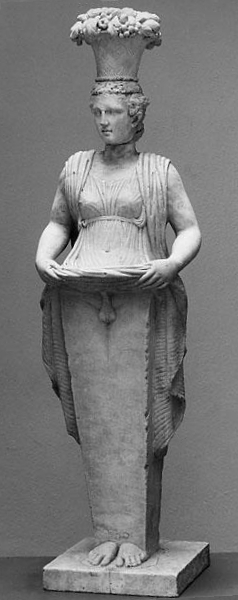
Ancient Greek herma of Aphroditus, a male form, (Nationalmuseum, Stockholm)

Aphrodite's most common cultic epithet was Ourania, meaning "heavenly", but this epithet almost never occurs in literary texts, indicating a purely cultic significance. Another common name for Aphrodite was Pandemos ("For All the Folk"). In her role as Aphrodite Pandemos, Aphrodite was associated with Peithō (Πείθω), meaning "persuasion", and could be prayed to for aid in seduction. The character of Pausanias in Plato's Symposium, takes differing cult-practices associated with different epithets of the goddess to claim that Ourania and Pandemos are, in fact, separate goddesses. He asserts that Aphrodite Ourania is the celestial Aphrodite, born from the sea foam after Cronus castrated Uranus, and the older of the two goddesses. According to the Symposium, Aphrodite Ourania is the inspiration of male homosexual desire, specifically the ephebic eros, and pederasty. Aphrodite Pandemos, by contrast, is the younger of the two goddesses: the common Aphrodite, born from the union of Zeus and Dione, and the inspiration of heterosexual desire and sexual promiscuity, the "lesser" of the two loves. Paphian (Παφία), was one of her epithets, after Paphos in Cyprus where she had emerged from the sea at her birth.

Among the Neoplatonists and, later, their Christian interpreters, Ourania is associated with spiritual love, and Pandemos with physical love (desire). A representation of Ourania with her foot resting on a tortoise came to be seen as emblematic of discretion in conjugal love; it was the subject of a chryselephantine sculpture by Phidias for Elis, known only from a parenthetical comment by the geographer Pausanias. The image was taken up again after the Renaissance.

One of Aphrodite's most common literary epithets is Philommeidḗs (φιλομμειδής), which means "smile-loving", but is sometimes mistranslated as "laughter-loving". This epithet occurs throughout both of the Homeric epics and the First Homeric Hymn to Aphrodite. Hesiod references it once in his Theogony in the context of Aphrodite's birth, but interprets it as "genital-loving" rather than "smile-loving", playing with the similar sound of the root words for "smile" (meid) and "genitals" (medea). Monica Cyrino notes that the epithet may relate to the fact that, in many artistic depictions of Aphrodite, she is shown smiling. Other epithets of her include Mechanitis meaning skilled in inventing and Automata because, according to Servius, she was the source of spontaneous love.

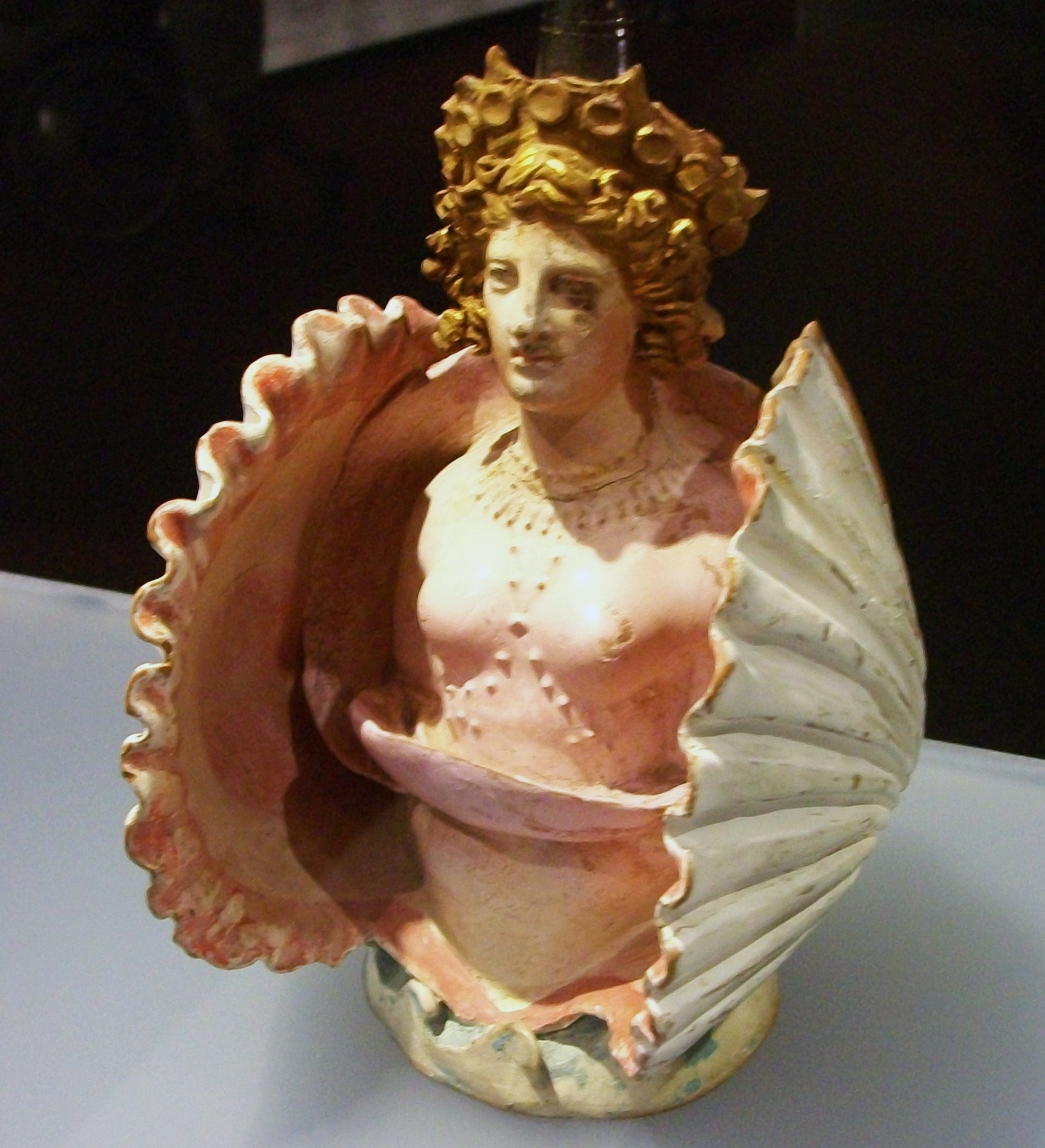
Early fourth-century BC Attic pottery vessel in the shape of Aphrodite inside a shell from the Phanagoria cemetery in the Taman Peninsula.

Other literary epithets of Aphrodite include Cypris and Cythereia, which derive from her associations with the islands of Cyprus and Cythera respectively. On Cyprus, Aphrodite was sometimes called Eleemon ("the merciful"). In Athens, she was known as Aphrodite en kēpois ("Aphrodite of the Gardens"). At Cape Colias, a promontory on the Attic coast, she was venerated as Genetyllis (Γενετυλλίς), the protectress of births. Her companions, who presided over generation and birth, were known by the plural form Genetyllides (Γενετυλλίδες). The Spartans worshipped her as Potnia "Mistress", Enoplios "Armed", Morpho "Shapely", Ambologera "She who Postpones Old Age". Across the Greek world, she was known under epithets such as Melainis in Corinth "Black or Dark One", Skotia "Dark One", Androphonos "Killer of Men", Anosia "Unholy", and Tymborychos "Gravedigger", all of which indicate her darker, more violent nature.

A male version of Aphrodite known as Aphroditus was worshipped in the city of Amathus on Cyprus. Aphroditus was depicted with the figure and dress of a woman, but had a beard, and was shown lifting his dress to reveal an erect phallus. This gesture was believed to be an apotropaic symbol, and was thought to convey good fortune upon the viewer. Eventually, the popularity of Aphroditus waned as the mainstream, fully feminine version of Aphrodite became more popular, but traces of his cult are preserved in the later legends of Hermaphroditus.

=== List of epithets ===
Many epithets were applied to Aphrodite in classical times:

- Androphagos, Man-eater.
- Anosia, Unholy.
- Aphrogeneia, Foam-sprung.
- Areia, War-like. There was an old xoanon of the goddess at Cythera. Several depictions in Greek art show Aphrodite as the opponent of the giant Mimas.
- Cypris (Κύπρις), of Cyprus. Cyprus is identified as her homeland by Homer and Hesiod; alternatively, according to the Suda, the name derives from her role as a bestower of pregnancy (κυόπορις; kyóporis).
- Cytheria (Κυθέρεια), of Cythera; alternatively, according to the Suda, the name derives from her concealment (κεύθειν) of love affairs (κεύθειν τοὺς ἔρωτας).
- Eleēmon, Merciful
- Enoplios, Armed, at Sparta.
- Euploia, of the good sailing tide, related to ships. She had a temple at Piraeus.
- Genetyllis, of the hour-of-birth. By Aristophanes, an epithet close to Kolias.
- Hera, at Sparta there was a temple of Hera-Hypercheiria and a xoanon of Aphrodite-Hera that was offered to the brides.
- En kẽpois, of the gardens. The oldest of the fates was called "Άφροδίτη έν κήποις" (Aphrodite of the Gardens).
- Epistrophia, of the return.
- Idalia, from Idalion in Cyprus.
- Kōlias, of Colias. Goddess of childbirth in Attica, with a temple on mount Colias.
- Limenia, of the harbour, at Hermione.
- Melainis, Dark.
- Melaina, Black.
- Morphō, Shapely, at Sparta. She was depicted with a veil and rocks near her feet.
- Nymphia, of marriage. She had a temple on the road from Troezen to Hermione.
- Olympia, of Olympia.
- Pandemos, of the whole demos. In Athens a great festival was celebrated on the Acropolis.
- Paphia, of Paphos, with a great festival. The priests performed her mysteries.
- Philomeidēs, Smile-loving.
- Pontia, of the open sea, at Hermione.
- Praxis, Active.
- Skotia, Gloomy.
- Ourania, Heavenly, that indicates her oriental descent.
- Zerynthia, from the town of Zerynthus.

== Worship ==
=== Classical period ===
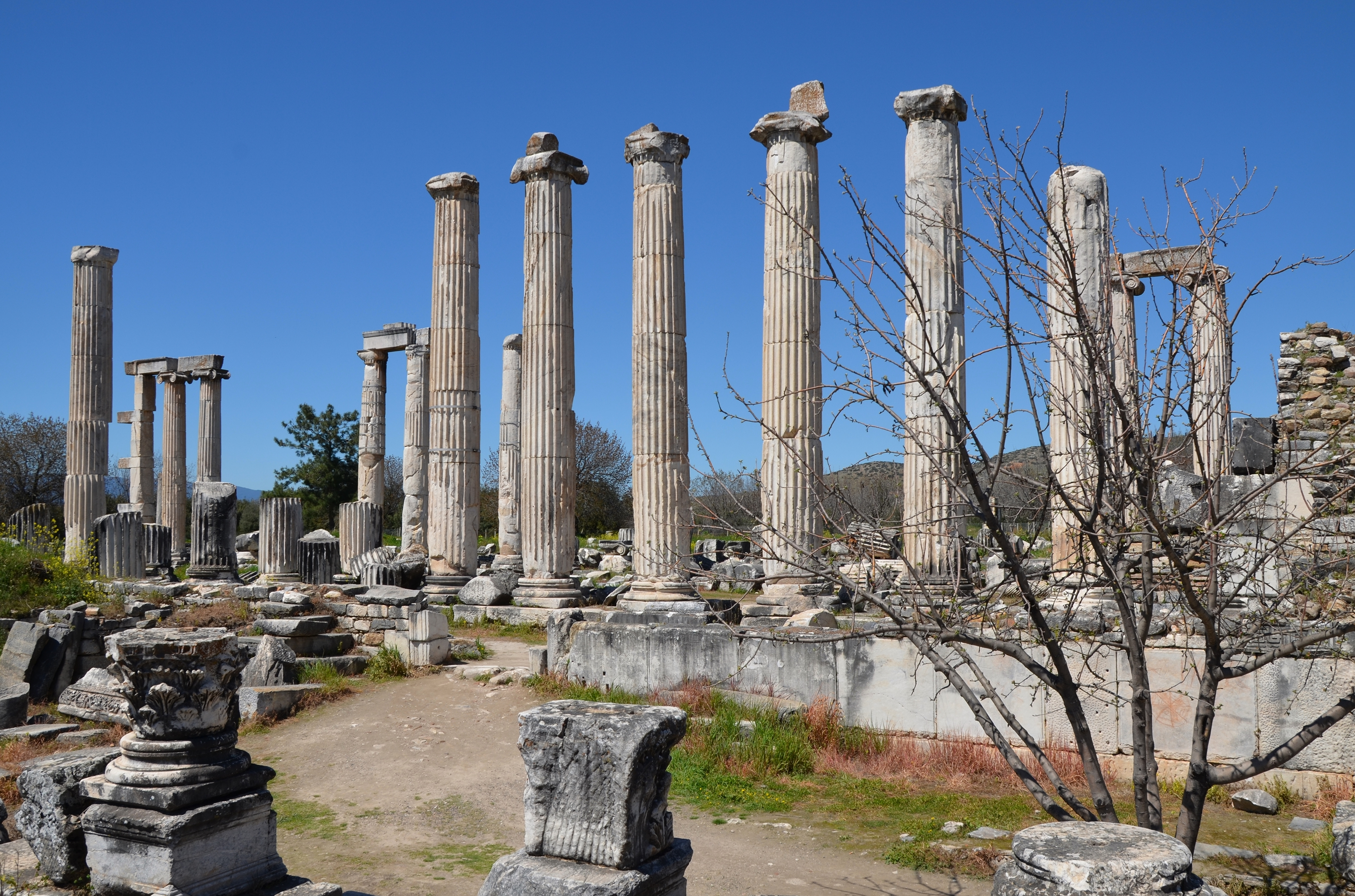
Ruins of the temple of Aphrodite at Aphrodisias

Aphrodite's main festival, the Aphrodisia, was celebrated across Greece, but particularly in Athens and Corinth. In Athens, the Aphrodisia was celebrated on the fourth day of the month of Hekatombaion in honor of Aphrodite's role in the unification of Attica. During this festival, the priests of Aphrodite would purify the temple of Aphrodite Pandemos on the southwestern slope of the Acropolis with the blood of a sacrificed dove. Next, the altars would be anointed and the cult statues of Aphrodite Pandemos and Peitho would be escorted in a majestic procession to a place where they would be ritually bathed. Aphrodite was honoured in Athens as part of the Arrhephoria festival. The fourth day of every month was sacred to Aphrodite.

Pausanias records that, in Sparta, Aphrodite was worshipped as Aphrodite Areia, which means "warlike". This epithet stresses Aphrodite's connections to Ares, with whom she had extramarital relations. Pausanias records that, in Sparta and on Cythera, extremely ancient cult statues of Aphrodite portrayed her bearing weapons. Other cult statues showed her bound in chains.

Aphrodite was the patron goddess of prostitutes of all varieties, ranging from pornai (cheap street prostitutes typically owned as slaves by wealthy pimps) to hetairai (expensive, well-educated hired companions, who were usually self-employed and sometimes provided sex to their customers). The city of Corinth was renowned throughout the ancient world for its many hetairai, reputed to be among the most skilled and most expensive prostitutes in the Greek world. Corinth had a major temple to Aphrodite on the Acrocorinth, and was one of the major sites of her cult. Numerous dedications to Aphrodite made by successful courtesans have survived in poems and in pottery inscriptions. References to Aphrodite in association with prostitution are found in Corinth as well as on the islands of Cyprus, Cythera, and Sicily. Aphrodite's Mesopotamian precursor Inanna-Ishtar was similarly associated with prostitution.

Scholars in the nineteenth and twentieth centuries believed that the cult of Aphrodite may have involved ritual prostitution, an assumption based on ambiguous passages in certain ancient texts, particularly a fragment of a skolion by the Boeotian poet Pindar, which mentions prostitutes in Corinth in association with Aphrodite. Modern scholars now dismiss the notion of ritual prostitution in Greece as a "historiographic myth" with no factual basis.

=== Hellenistic and Roman periods ===
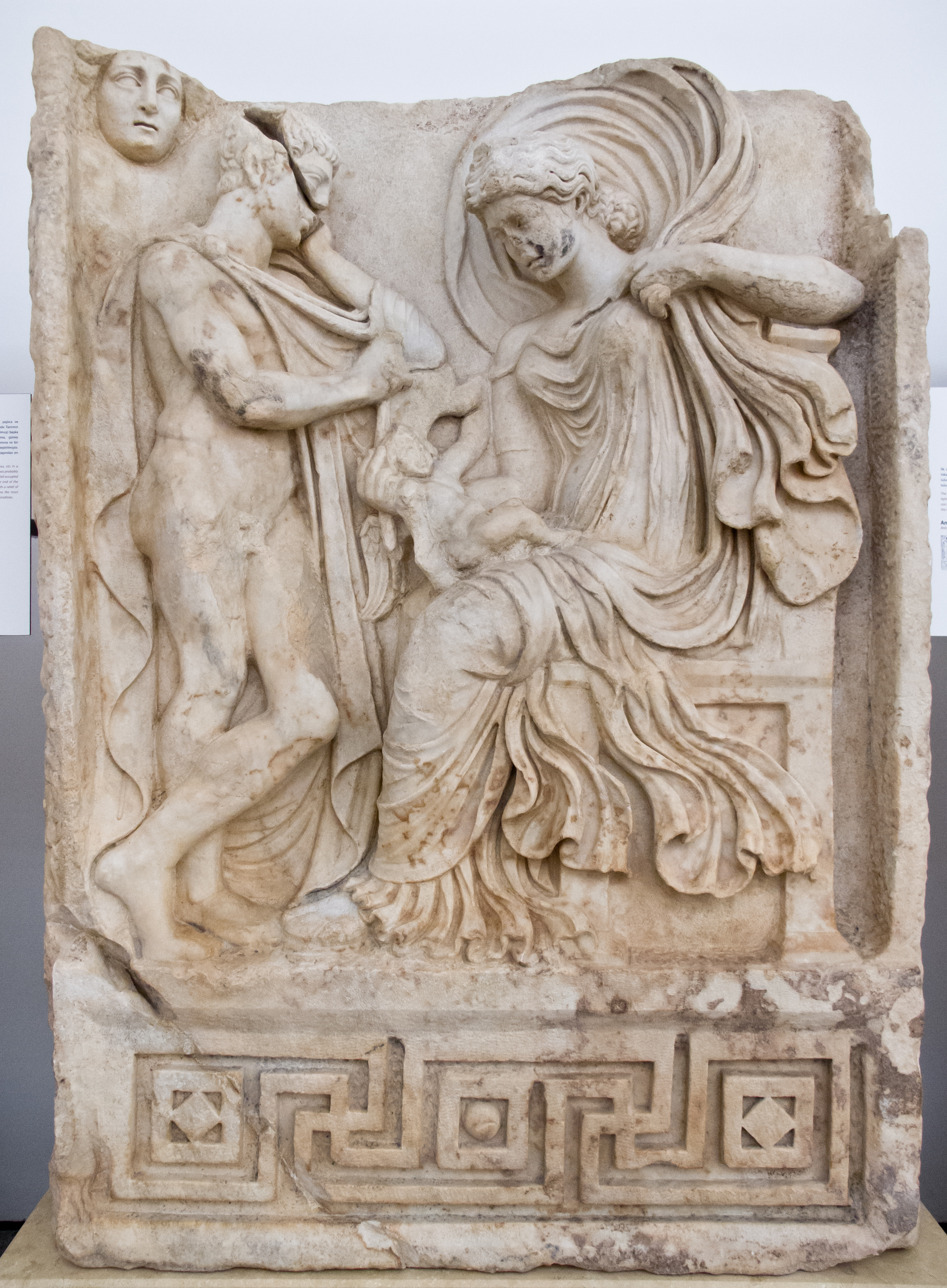
Greek relief from Aphrodisias, depicting a Roman-influenced Aphrodite sitting on a throne holding an infant while the shepherd Anchises stands beside her.

During the Hellenistic period (323–30 BC), the Greeks identified Aphrodite with the ancient Egyptian goddesses Hathor and Isis. Aphrodite was the patron goddess of the Ptolemaic queens and Queen Arsinoe II was identified as her mortal incarnation. Aphrodite was worshipped in Alexandria and had numerous temples in and around the city. Arsinoe II introduced the cult of Adonis to Alexandria and many of the women there partook in it. The Tessarakonteres, a gigantic catamaran galley designed by Archimedes for Ptolemy IV Philopator, had a circular temple to Aphrodite on it with a marble statue of the goddess herself. In the second century BC, Ptolemy VIII Physcon and his wives Cleopatra II and Cleopatra III dedicated a temple to Aphrodite Hathor at Philae. Statuettes of Aphrodite for personal devotion became common in Egypt starting in the early Ptolemaic times and extending until long after Egypt became a Roman province.

The ancient Romans identified Aphrodite with their goddess Venus, who was originally a goddess of agricultural fertility, vegetation, and springtime. According to the Roman historian Livy, Aphrodite and Venus were officially identified in the third century BC when the cult of Venus Erycina was introduced to Rome from the Greek sanctuary of Aphrodite on Mount Eryx in Sicily. After this point, Romans adopted Aphrodite's iconography and myths and applied them to Venus. Because Aphrodite was the mother of the Trojan hero Aeneas in Greek mythology and the Roman tradition claimed Aeneas as the founder of Rome, Venus became venerated as Venus Genetrix, the mother of the entire Roman nation. Julius Caesar claimed to be directly descended from Aeneas's son Iulus as a member of the gens Julia and became a strong proponent of the cult of Venus. This precedent was later followed by his nephew Augustus, the first emperor, and the later emperors claiming succession from him.

This syncretism greatly impacted Greek worship of Aphrodite. During the Roman era, the cults of Aphrodite in many Greek cities began to emphasize her relationship with Troy and Aeneas. They began to adopt distinctively Roman elements, portraying Aphrodite as more maternal, more militaristic, and more concerned with administrative bureaucracy. She was claimed as a divine guardian by many political magistrates. Appearances of Aphrodite in Greek literature vastly proliferated, usually showing Aphrodite in a characteristically Roman manner.

== Mythology ==
=== Birth ===
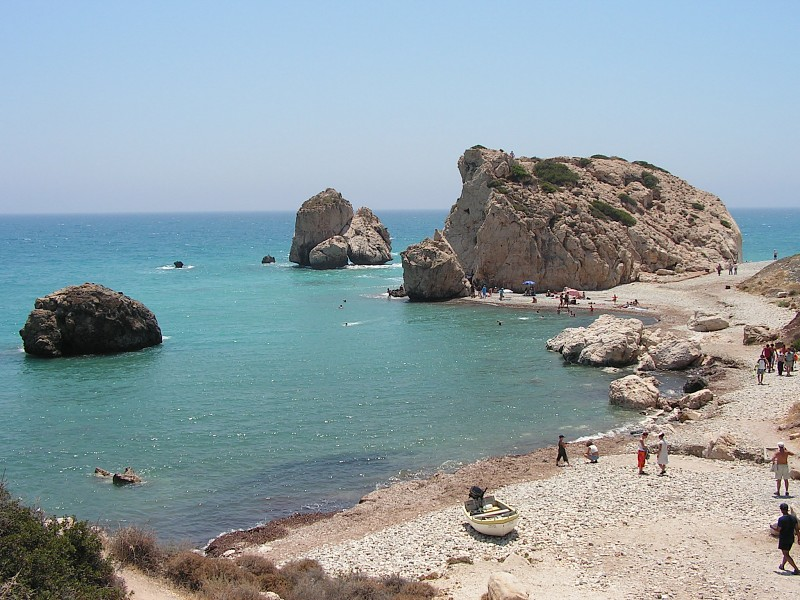
Petra tou Romiou ("The rock of the Greek"), Aphrodite's legendary birthplace in Paphos, Cyprus

According to Hesiod's Theogony, Cronus severed Uranus' genitals and threw them behind him into the sea. The foam from his genitals gave rise to Aphrodite, who washed up to shore in the presence of the other gods. This story is probably derived from The Song of Kumarbi, an ancient Hittite epic poem in which the god Kumarbi overthrows his father Anu, the god of the sky, and bites off his genitals, causing him to become pregnant and give birth to Anu's children, which include Ishtar. In the Iliad, Aphrodite is described as the daughter of Zeus and Dione. The location of her birth was generally said to have been near the island of Cyprus, which is why she is sometimes called "Cyprian", or near the island of Cythera (hence the epithet "Cytherea").

=== Marriage ===
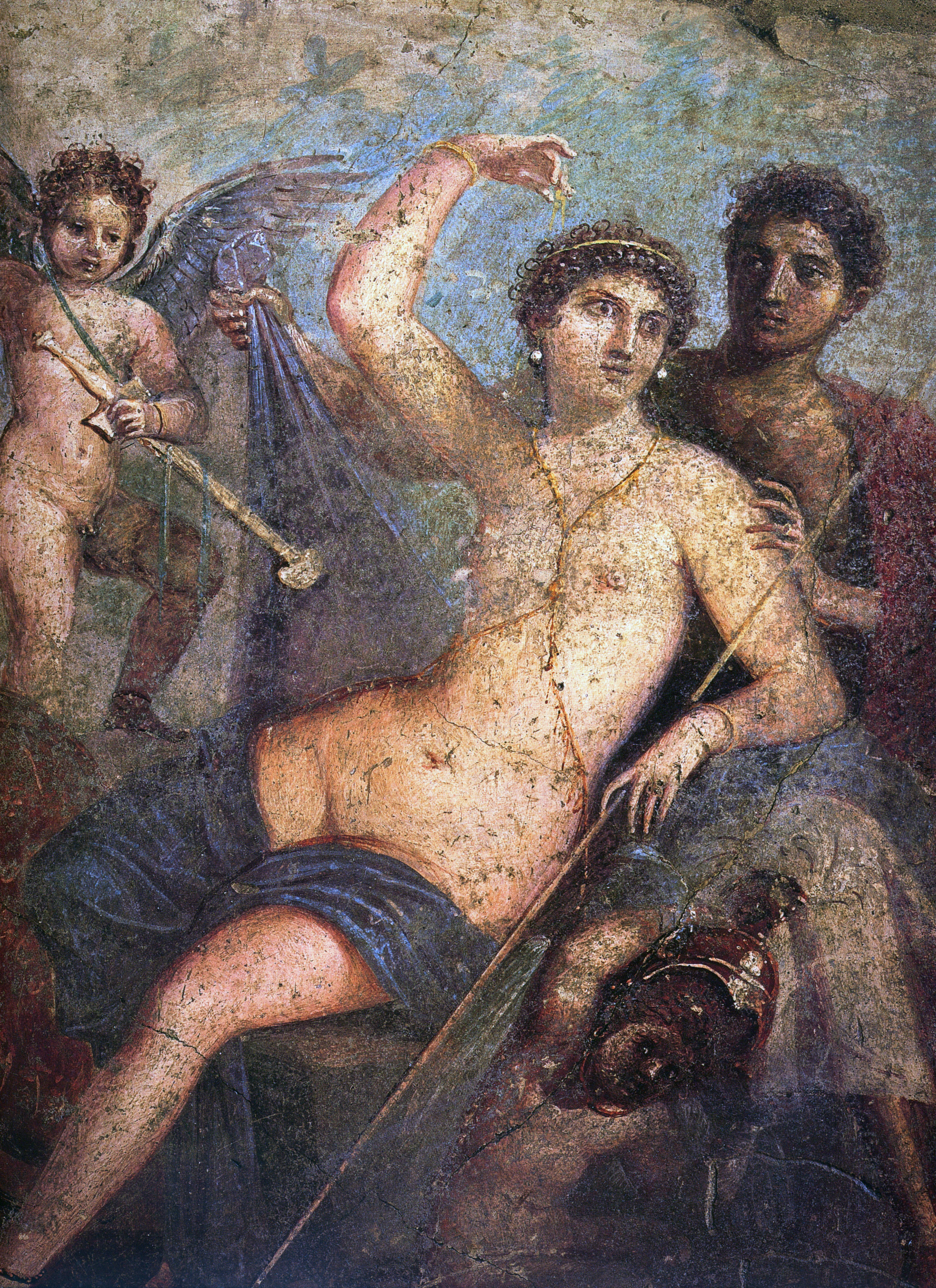
First-century AD Roman fresco of Mars and Venus from Pompeii

In the Iliad, Aphrodite is the apparently unmarried consort of Ares, the god of war, and the wife of Hephaestus is a different goddess named Charis. In Hesiod's Theogony, Aphrodite is unmarried and the wife of Hephaestus is Aglaea, the youngest of the three Charites. In the Odyssey, the blind singer Demodocus describes Aphrodite as the wife of Hephaestus and tells how she committed adultery with Ares during the Trojan War. The sun-god Helios saw the pair having sex in Hephaestus's bed and warned Hephaestus, who fashioned a fine, near-invisible net. The next time Ares and Aphrodite made love, the net trapped them both. Hephaestus brought all the gods into the bedchamber to laugh at the captured adulterers. This narrative probably originated as a Greek folk tale, independent of the Odyssey. After exposing them, Hephaestus asks Zeus for his wedding gifts and dowry to be returned. In later sources, it was generally Ares who was regarded as the husband or official consort of the goddess, such as on a sixth-century BC krater known as the François Vase (in which they arrive together at Peleus and Thetis' wedding), and in the poetry of Pindar and Aeschylus.

A common interpretation of how Aphrodite's unlikely marriage to Hephaestus came to be is that after he gave his mother Hera a golden throne that trapped her he refused to let her go until the gods agreed to give him Aphrodite's hand in marriage. There is no unambiguous evidence for such a version from antiquity. This narrative is reconstructed based on several elements, such as Hyginus' account that Hephaestus demanded (and was given) Athena's hand in marriage for releasing Hera, and the François Vase, which depicts Hephaestus' return to Olympus; Aphrodite stands in front of the scene, with a clear look of agitation on her face, while a sullen-looking Ares kneels down. If such narrative indeed existed, it must have been included in the now poorly-preserved Homeric Hymn to Dionysus, which dealt with Hephaestus' return to Olympus after Hera's entrapment, and which was greatly popular and influential during the sixth and fifth centuries BC. Another possible echo of it is found in the Deception of Zeus episode of the Iliad, where Hera goes to Lemnos (Hephaestus' sacred island) and asks a favour from the sleep-god Hypnos in exchange for a golden throne and marriage to Pasithea, one of the Graces; the Graces were beauty goddesses and associates of Aphrodite, and in this instance it would seem that Pasithea acts as a substitute for Aphrodite herself.

Hephaestus was overjoyed to be married to the goddess of beauty, and forged her beautiful jewelry and a saltire-shaped undergarment (called a strophion) which accentuated her breasts and made her even more irresistible to men.

=== Attendants ===
Aphrodite is almost always accompanied by Eros, the personification of love. In the Theogony, Eros is one of the four primeval forces born at the beginning of time. After the birth of Aphrodite from the sea foam, he is joined by Himeros and together they become Aphrodite's companions. In early Greek art, Eros and Himeros are both shown as idealized handsome youths with wings. Eros is often seen as Aphrodite's son. A scholion on Theocritus's Idylls remarks that the sixth-century BC poet Sappho had described Eros as the son of Aphrodite and Uranus.

Aphrodite's main attendants were the three Charites, whom Hesiod identifies as the daughters of Zeus and Eurynome and names as Aglaea ("Splendor"), Euphrosyne ("Good Cheer"), and Thalia ("Abundance"). Aphrodite's other set of attendants was the three Horae (the "Hours"), whom Hesiod identifies as the daughters of Zeus and Themis and names as Eunomia ("Good Order"), Dike ("Justice"), and Eirene ("Peace"). Aphrodite was sometimes accompanied by Harmonia, her daughter by Ares, and Hebe, the daughter of Zeus and Hera.

=== Anchises ===
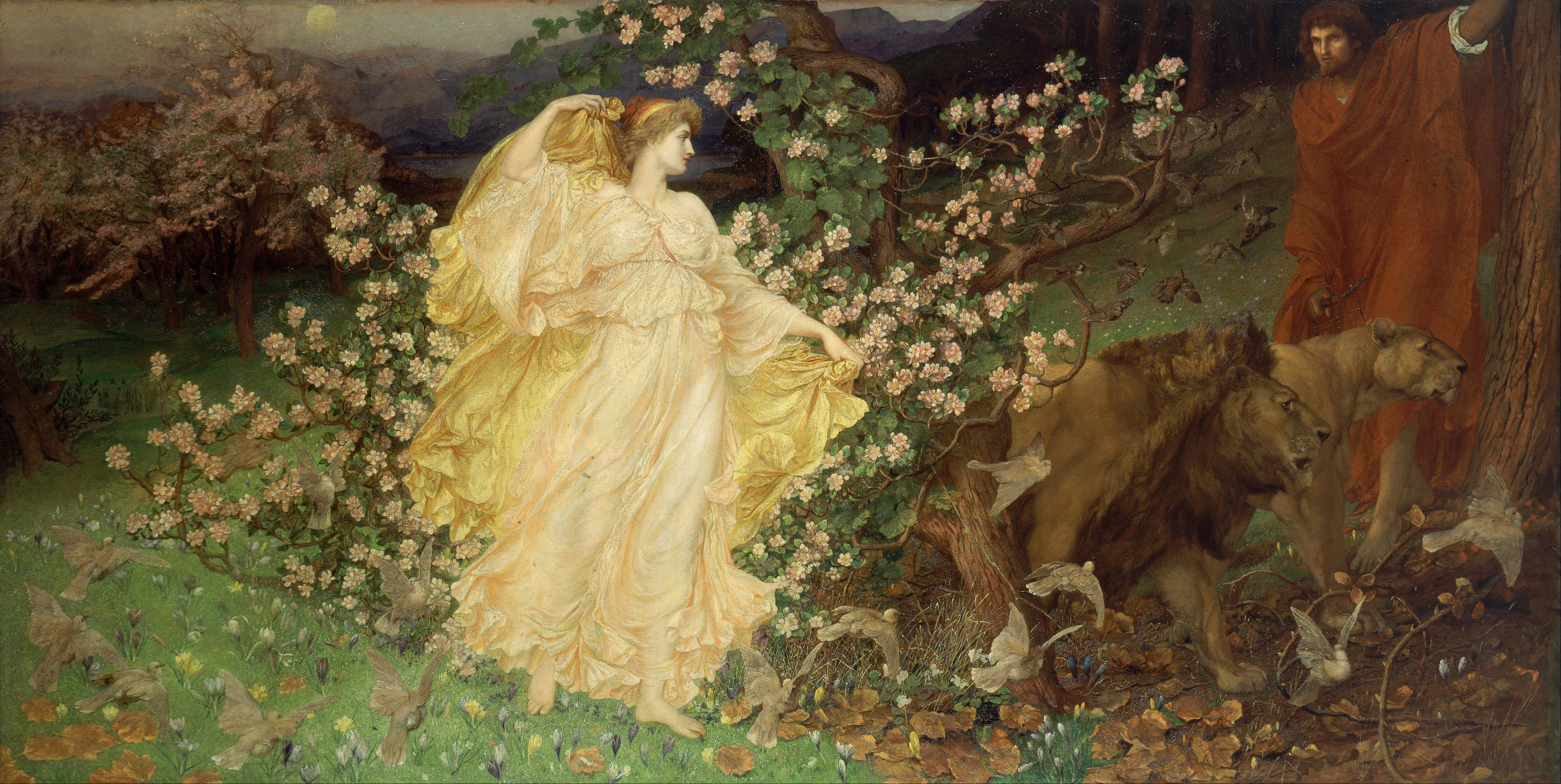
Venus and Anchises (1889 or 1890) by William Blake Richmond

The First Homeric Hymn to Aphrodite (Hymn 5), which was probably composed sometime in the mid-seventh century BC, describes how Zeus once became annoyed with Aphrodite for causing deities to fall in love with mortals, so he caused her to fall in love with Anchises, a handsome mortal shepherd who lived in the foothills beneath Mount Ida near the city of Troy. Aphrodite appears to Anchises in the form of a tall, beautiful mortal while he is alone in his home. Anchises sees her dressed in bright clothing and gleaming jewelry, with her breasts shining with divine radiance. He asks her if she is Aphrodite and promises to build her an altar on top of the mountain if she will bless him and his family. Aphrodite tells him that she is not a goddess, but the daughter of one of the noble families of Phrygia. She claims that she is still a virgin and begs Anchises to take her to his parents. He is overcome with lust and swears he will have sex with her. Anchises takes Aphrodite, with her eyes cast downwards, to his bed. He then strips her naked and makes love to her.

After the lovemaking is complete, Aphrodite reveals her true divine form. Anchises is terrified, but Aphrodite consoles him and promises that she will bear him a son, the demigod Aeneas, who will go to Troy to become a nobleman like his father. The story of Aeneas's conception is mentioned in Hesiod's Theogony and in Book II of Homer's Iliad.

=== Adonis ===
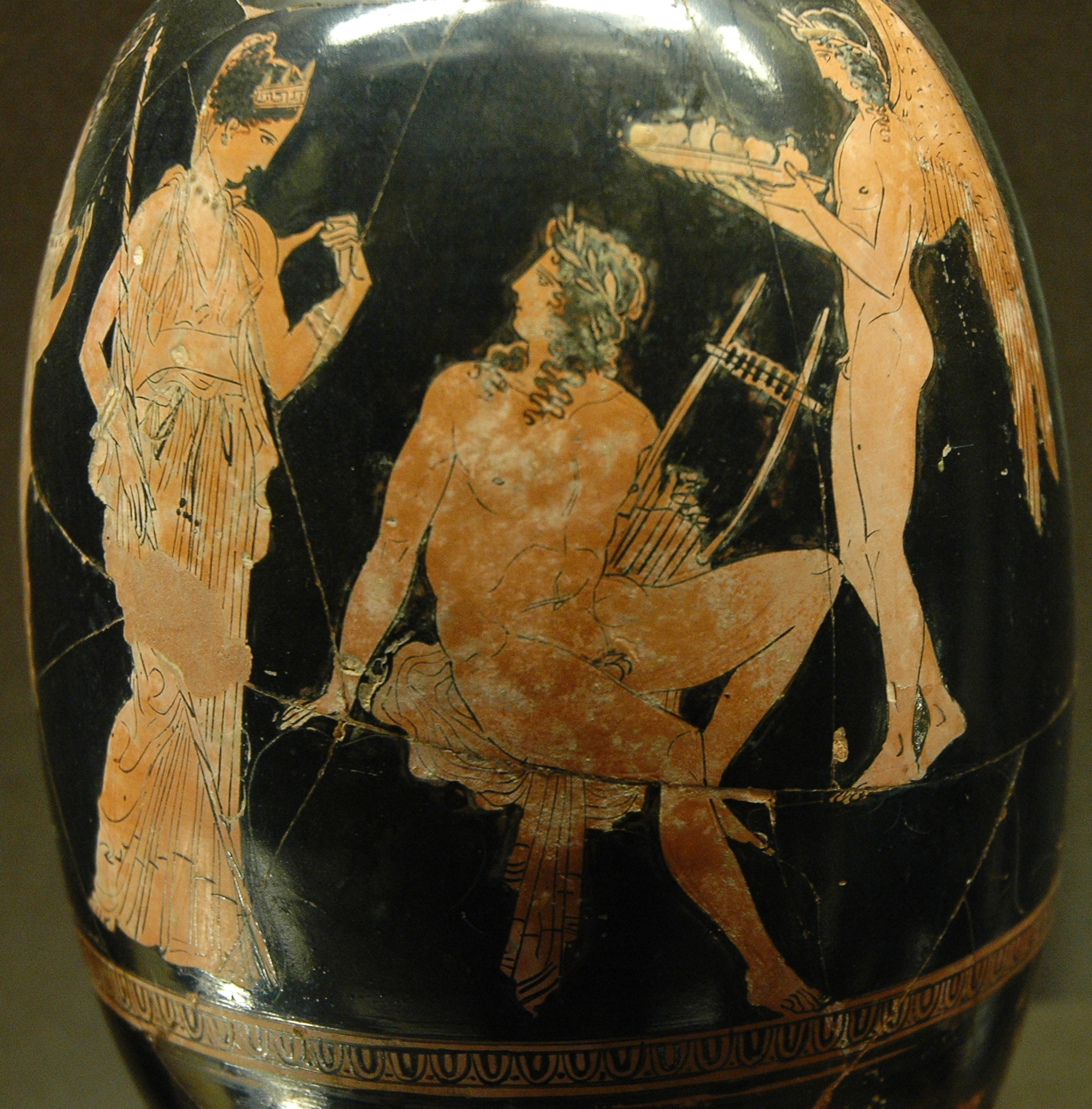
Attic red-figure aryballos by Aison (c. 410 BC) showing Aphrodite consorting with Adonis, who is seated and playing the lyre, while Eros stands behind him

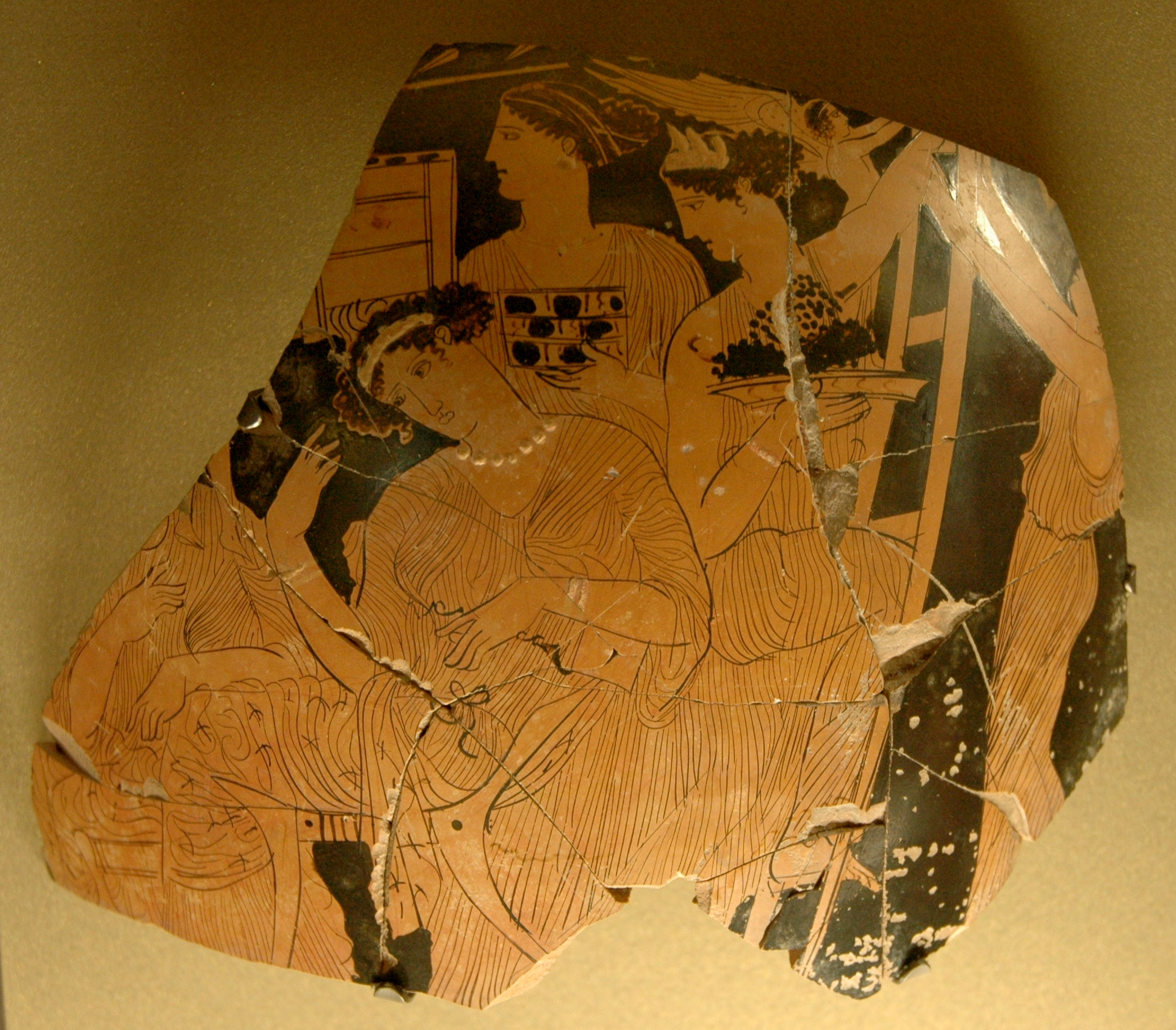
Fragment of an Attic red-figure wedding vase (c. 430–420 BC), showing women climbing ladders up to the roofs of their houses carrying "gardens of Adonis"

The earliest known Greek reference to Adonis comes from a fragment of a poem by the Lesbian poet Sappho (c. 630 – c. 570 BC), in which a chorus of young girls asks Aphrodite what they can do to mourn Adonis's death. Aphrodite replies that they must beat their breasts and tear their tunics. According to a version in Ovid's Metamorphoses, published in 8 AD, Adonis was the son of Myrrha, who was cursed by Aphrodite with insatiable lust for her own father, King Cinyras of Cyprus, after Myrrha's mother bragged that her daughter was more beautiful than the goddess. Driven out after becoming pregnant, Myrrha was changed into a myrrh tree, but still gave birth to Adonis.

Aphrodite found the baby and took him to the underworld to be fostered by Persephone. She returned for him once he was grown and discovered him to be strikingly handsome. Persephone wanted to keep Adonis, resulting in a custody battle between the two goddesses over whom should rightly possess Adonis. Zeus settled the dispute by decreeing that Adonis would spend one third of the year with Aphrodite, one third with Persephone, and one third with whomever he chose. Adonis chose to spend that time with Aphrodite. Then, one day, while Adonis was hunting, he was wounded by a wild boar and bled to death in Aphrodite's arms. In a semi-mocking work, the Dialogues of the Gods, the satirical author Lucian comedically relates how a frustrated Aphrodite complains to the moon goddess Selene about her son Eros making Persephone fall in love with Adonis and now she has to share him with her.

In different versions of the story, the boar was either sent by Ares, who was jealous that Aphrodite was spending so much time with Adonis, or by Artemis, who wanted revenge against Aphrodite for having killed her devoted follower Hippolytus. In another version, Apollo in fury changed himself into a boar and killed Adonis because Aphrodite had blinded his son Erymanthus when he stumbled upon Aphrodite naked as she was bathing after intercourse with Adonis. Reportedly, as she mourned Adonis's death, she caused anemones to grow wherever his blood fell and declared a festival on the anniversary of his death. In one version of the story, Aphrodite injured herself on a thorn from a rose bush and the rose, which had previously been white, was stained red by her blood. The myth of Adonis is associated with the festival of the Adonia, which was celebrated by Greek women every year in midsummer. During the festival, women would mourn and lament loudly over the death of Adonis, tearing their clothes and beating their breasts in a public display of grief.

=== Divine favoritism ===
In Hesiod's Works and Days, Zeus orders Aphrodite to make Pandora, the first woman, physically beautiful and sexually attractive. so "men will love to embrace" her. Aphrodite "spills grace" over Pandora's head and equips her with "painful desire and knee-weakening anguish". Aphrodite's attendants, Peitho, the Charites, and the Horae, adorn Pandora with finery and jewelry.

Aphrodite was said to have raised the orphaned siblings Cleothera and Merope. When they were of age, Aphrodite consulted with Zeus to secure happy marriages for them.

According to one myth, Aphrodite aided Hippomenes, a noble youth who wished to marry Atalanta, a maiden who was renowned throughout the land for her beauty, but who refused to marry any man unless he could outrun her in a footrace. Atalanta was an exceedingly swift runner and she beheaded all of the men who lost to her. Aphrodite gave Hippomenes three golden apples from the Garden of the Hesperides and instructed him to toss them in front of Atalanta as he raced her. Hippomenes obeyed Aphrodite's order and Atalanta, seeing the beautiful, golden fruits, bent down to pick up each one, allowing Hippomenes to outrun her. In the version of the story from Ovid's Metamorphoses, Hippomenes forgets to repay Aphrodite for her aid, so she causes the couple to become inflamed with lust while they are staying at the temple of Cybele. The couple desecrate the temple by having sex in it, leading Cybele to turn them into lions as punishment.

The myth of Pygmalion is first mentioned by the third-century BC Greek writer Philostephanus of Cyrene, but is first recounted in detail in Ovid's Metamorphoses. According to Ovid, Pygmalion was Cyprian sculptor who fell in love with the ivory cult statue he was carving of Aphrodite and longed to marry it. Because Pygmalion was pious to Aphrodite, the goddess brought the statue to life, and Pygmalion the girl.

=== Anger myths ===
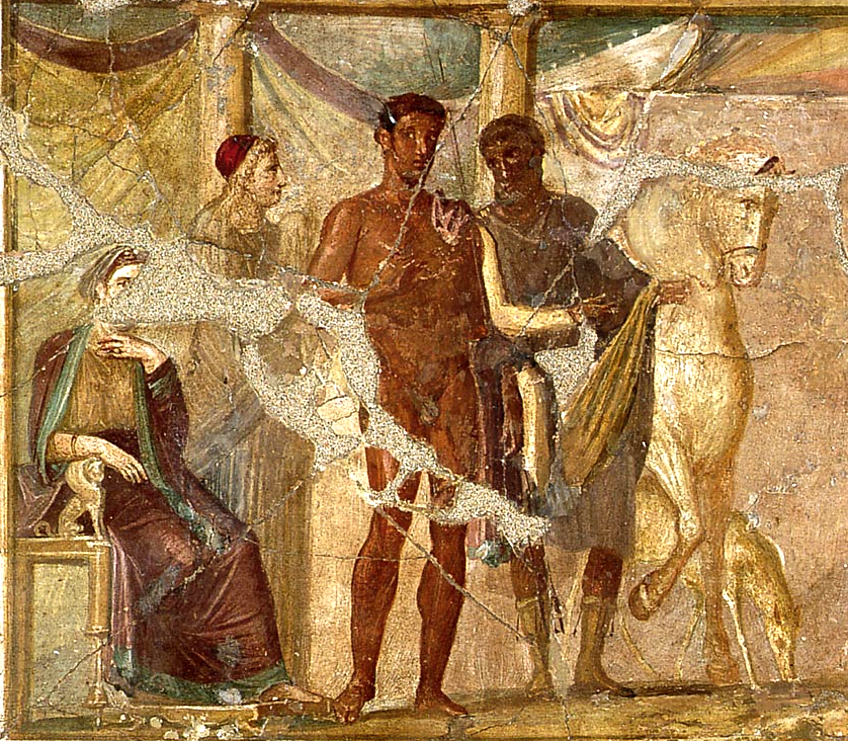
First-century AD Roman fresco from Pompeii showing the virgin Hippolytus spurning the advances of his stepmother Phaedra, whom Aphrodite caused to fall in love with him in order to bring about his tragic death.

Aphrodite generously rewarded those who honored her, but punished those who disrespected her, often quite brutally. In Apollonius of Rhodes's Argonautica and the Bibliotheca of Apollodorus, the women of the island of Lemnos refused to sacrifice to Aphrodite, and the goddess cursed them to stink horribly so that their husbands would never have sex with them. Their husbands started having sex with their Thracian slave-girls. In anger, the women of Lemnos murdered the entire male population of the island, as well as all the Thracian slaves. When Jason and his crew of Argonauts arrived on Lemnos, they mated with the sex-starved women under Aphrodite's approval and repopulated the island. From then on, the women of Lemnos never disrespected Aphrodite again.

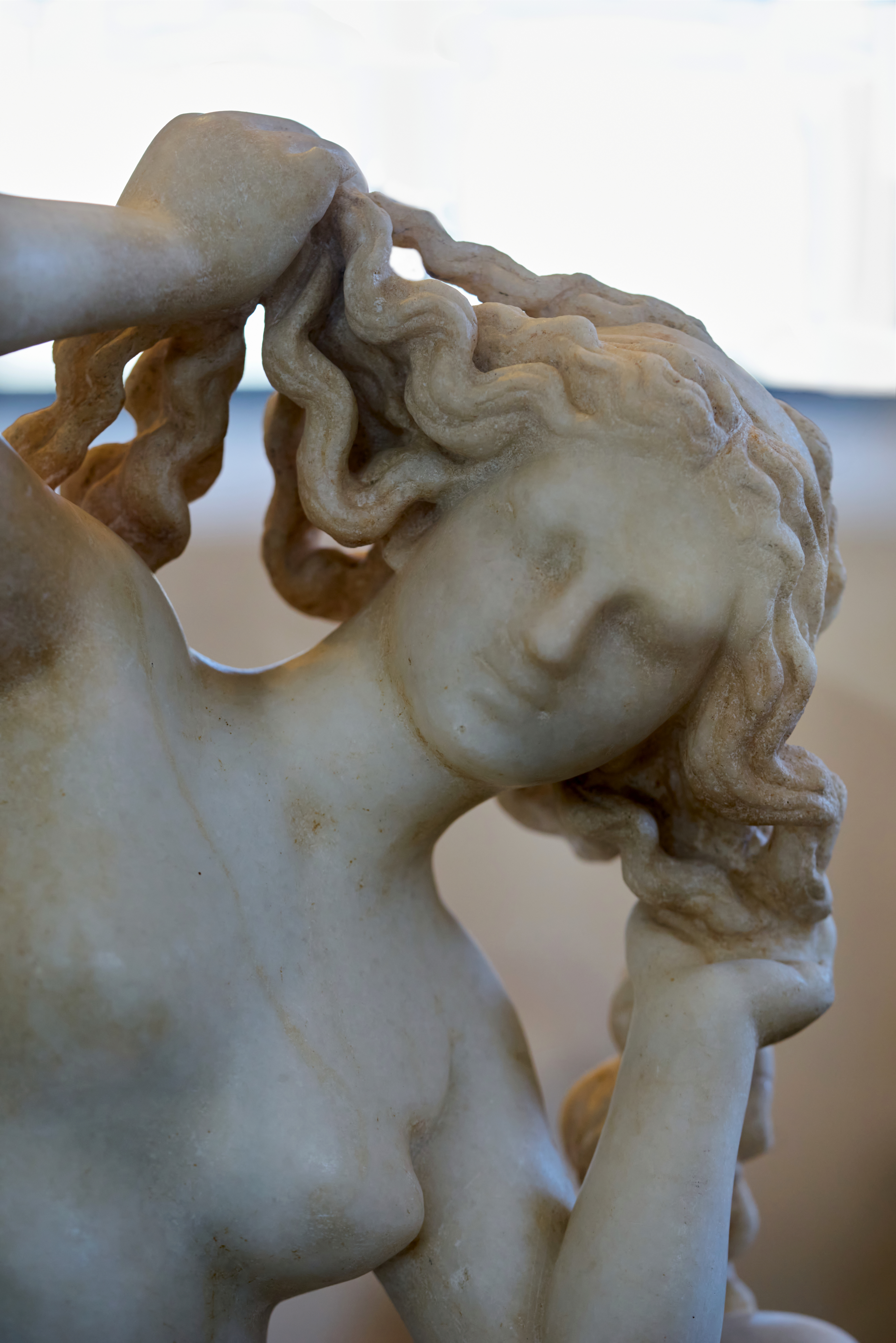
The Aphrodite of Rhodes, c. 2nd century BC, Rhodes Archaeological Museum.

In Euripides's tragedy Hippolytus, which was first performed at the City Dionysia in 428 BC, Theseus's son Hippolytus worships only Artemis, the goddess of virginity, and refuses to engage in any form of sexual contact. Aphrodite is infuriated by his prideful behavior and, in the prologue to the play, she declares that, by honoring only Artemis and refusing to venerate her, Hippolytus has directly challenged her authority. Aphrodite therefore causes Hippolytus's stepmother, Phaedra, to fall in love with him, knowing Hippolytus will reject her. After being rejected, Phaedra commits suicide and leaves a suicide note to Theseus telling him that she killed herself because Hippolytus attempted to rape her. Theseus prays to Poseidon to kill Hippolytus for his transgression. Poseidon sends a wild bull to scare Hippolytus's horses as he is riding by the sea in his chariot, causing the horses to bolt and smash the chariot against the cliffs, dragging Hippolytus to a bloody death across the rocky shoreline. The play concludes with Artemis vowing to kill Aphrodite's own mortal beloved (presumably Adonis) in revenge.

According to Ovid in his Metamorphoses, the Propoetides who are the daughters of Propoetus from the city of Amathus on the island of Cyprus denied Aphrodite's divinity and failed to worship her properly. Therefore, Aphrodite turned them into the world's first prostitutes.

According to Stesichorus and Hesiod while Tyndareus was sacrificing to the gods he forgot Aphrodite, inciting the goddess to cause his daughters to marry two or three times and desert their husbands.

In one of the versions of the legend, Pasiphae did not make offerings to the goddess Venus [Aphrodite]. Because of this, Venus [Aphrodite] inspired in her an unnatural love for a bull resulting in the birth of the Minotaur or she cursed her because she was Helios's daughter who revealed her adultery to Hephaestus.

=== Judgment of Paris and Trojan War ===
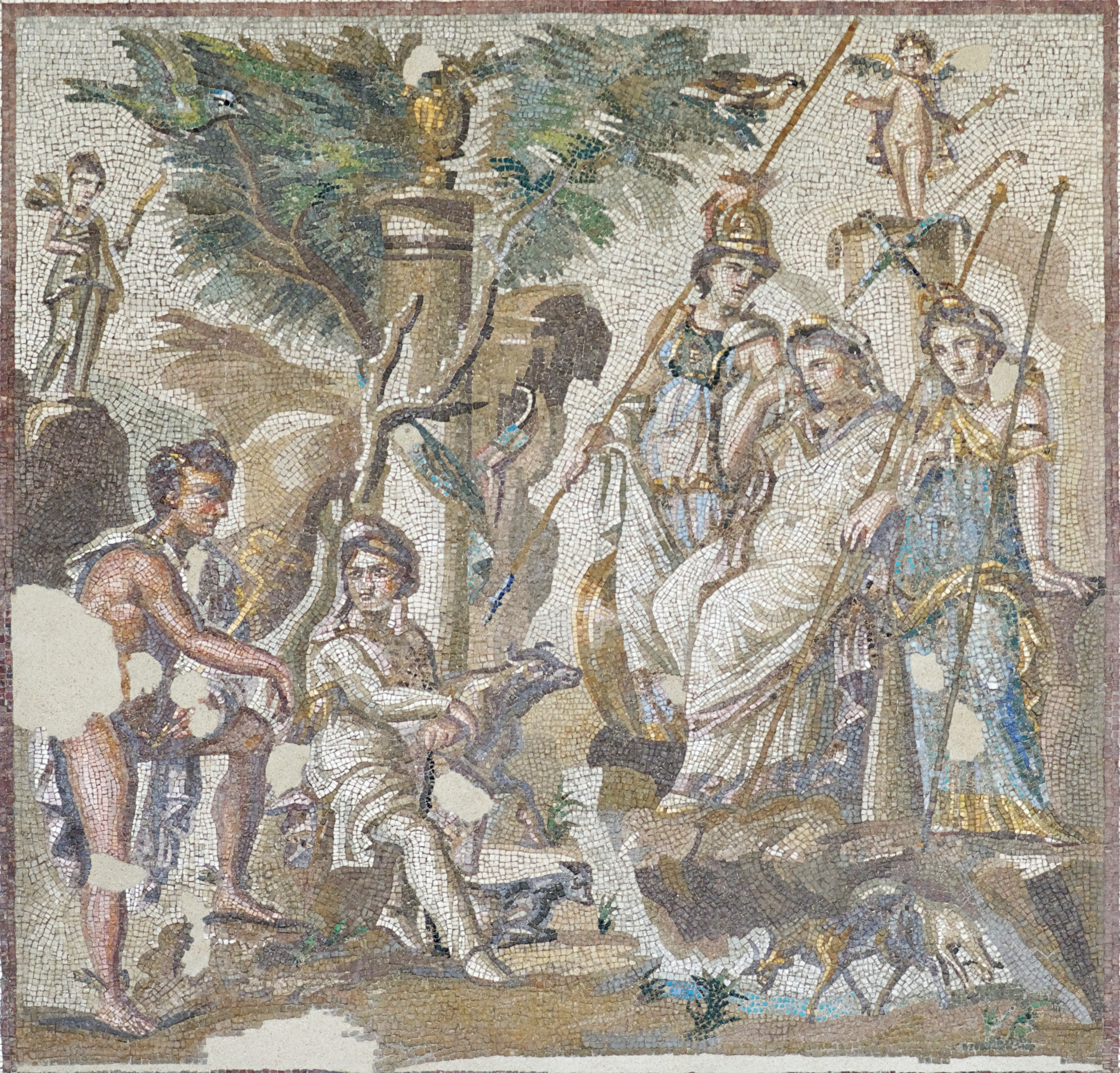
Ancient Greek mosaic from Antioch dating to the second century AD, depicting the Judgment of Paris

The myth of the Judgment of Paris is mentioned briefly in the Iliad, but is described in depth in an epitome of the Cypria, a lost poem of the Epic Cycle, which records that all the gods and goddesses as well as various mortals were invited to the marriage of Peleus and Thetis (the eventual parents of Achilles). Only Eris, goddess of discord, was not invited. Annoyed, she arrived with a golden apple inscribed with the word καλλίστῃ (kallistēi, "for the fairest"), which she threw among the goddesses. Aphrodite, Hera, and Athena all claimed to be the fairest, and thus the rightful owner of the apple. The goddesses placed the matter before Zeus, who put the choice into the hands of Paris, a Trojan prince. The goddesses presented themselves before Paris; in ancient depictions of the scene Aphrodite is only occasionally represented nude, and Athena and Hera are always fully clothed. Paris could not decide between the goddesses, so they attempted to bribe him: Hera with power over all Asia and Europe; Athena with wisdom, fame and glory in battle; and Aphrodite the hand in marriage of Helen, the most beautiful woman on earth. Paris selected Aphrodite and awarded her the apple.

In Book III of the Iliad, Aphrodite rescues Paris from Menelaus after he foolishly challenges him to a one-on-one duel. She then appears to Helen in the form of an old woman and attempts to persuade her to have sex with Paris, reminding her of his physical beauty and athletic prowess. Helen immediately recognizes Aphrodite by her beautiful neck, perfect breasts, and flashing eyes and sharply chides the goddess. Aphrodite rebukes Helen, reminding her that, if she vexes her, she will punish her just as much as she has favored her already. Helen demurely follows Aphrodite's command.

In Book V, Aphrodite charges into battle to rescue her son Aeneas from the Greek hero Diomedes. Diomedes recognizes Aphrodite as a "weakling" goddess and, thrusting his spear under Athena's guidance, nicks her wrist through her "ambrosial robe". Aphrodite borrows Ares's chariot to ride back to Mount Olympus, where she meets Dione. Aphrodite complains to her mother about Diomedes' handiwork, and Dione consoles her daughter and heals her wounds. Zeus chides her for putting herself in danger, reminding her that "her specialty is love, not war." According to Walter Burkert, this scene directly parallels a scene from Tablet VI of the Epic of Gilgamesh in which Ishtar cries to her mother Antu after the hero Gilgamesh rejects her sexual advances, but she is mildly rebuked by her father Anu. In Book XIV of the Iliad, during the Dios Apate episode, Aphrodite lends her kestos himas to Hera for the purpose of seducing Zeus and distracting him from the battlefield, so the gods could interfere without the fear of Zeus.

=== Consorts and offspring ===
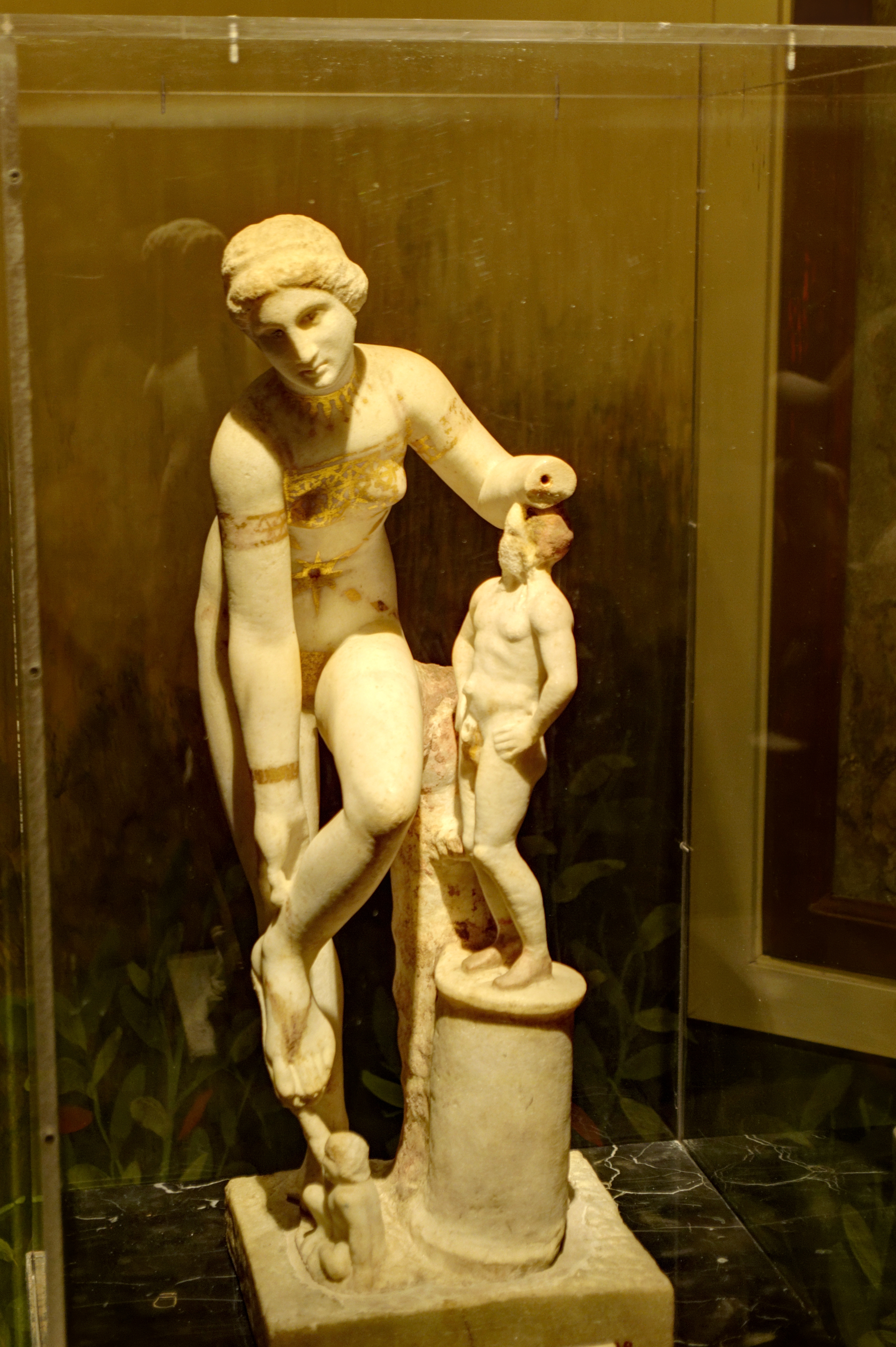
The so-called "Venus in a bikini", depicts her Greek counterpart Aphrodite as she is about to untie her sandal, with a small Eros squatting beneath her left arm, 1st-century AD. (Note: Museo Archeologico Nazionale (Napoli) so-called Venus in a bikini", Cir.campania.beniculturali.it.)

While Aphrodite was pregnant with Priapus, Hera applied an evil potion to her belly while she was sleeping to ensure that the child would be hideous out of envy or because Zeus was the father. When born, the child had a massive, permanently erect penis, a potbelly, and a huge tongue. Aphrodite abandoned the infant to die in the wilderness, where a herdsman found him and raised him.

Consort	Offspring
Adonis	Beroe, Golgos, Zariadres, Priapus (rarely)
Anchises	Aeneas, Lyrus/Lyrnus
Ares	Phobos, Deimos, Harmonia, the Erotes (Eros, Anteros, (Note: Anteros was originally born from the sea alongside Aphrodite; only later became her son.) Himeros, Pothos)
Butes	Eryx, Meligounis and several more unnamed daughters
Dionysus	Hymenaios, Iacchus, Priapus, the Charites (Graces: Aglaea, Euphrosyne, Thalia)
Hermes	Hermaphroditos, Priapus
Hephaestus	Eros (Note: In some versions.)
Phaethon	None
Phaon	None
Poseidon	Rhodos
Zeus	Priapus
Unknown	Peitho

== Iconography ==
=== Symbolism ===
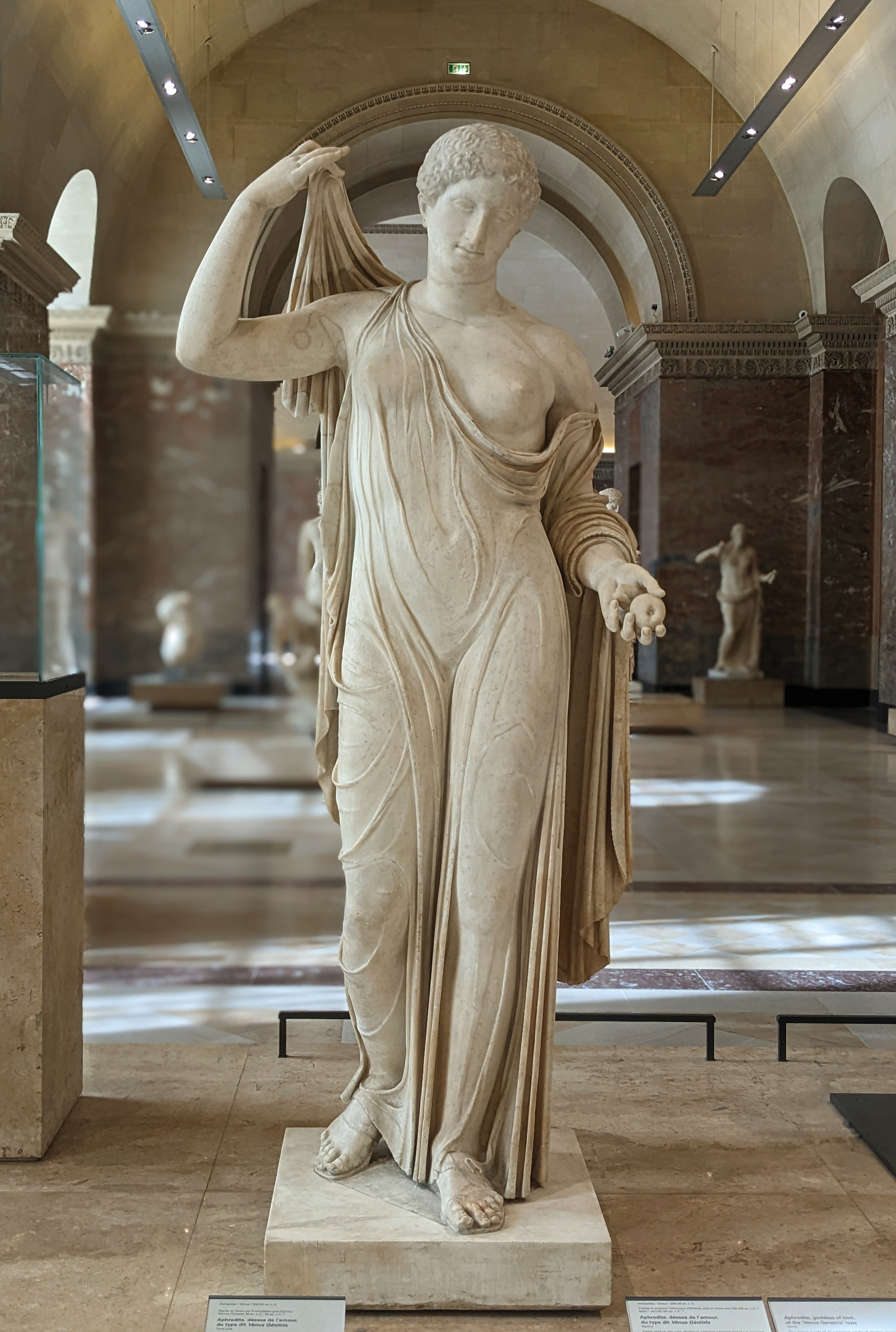
The Aphrodite of Fréjus. She holds the apple of Discord in her left hand.

Aphrodite's most prominent avian symbol was the dove, originally a symbol of her Near Eastern precursor Inanna-Ishtar. (Note: The ancient Greek word for "dove", peristerá, may be derived from a Semitic phrase peraḥ Ištar, meaning "bird of Ishtar".) Aphrodite frequently appears with doves in ancient Greek pottery and the temple of Aphrodite Pandemos on the southwest slope of the Athenian Acropolis was decorated with relief sculptures of doves with knotted fillets in their beaks. Votive offerings of small, white, marble doves were discovered in the temple of Aphrodite at Daphni. In addition to her associations with doves, Aphrodite was linked with sparrows and she is described riding in a chariot pulled by sparrows in Sappho's "Ode to Aphrodite". According to myth, the dove was originally a nymph named Peristera who helped Aphrodite win in a flower-picking contest over her son Eros; for this Eros turned her into a dove, but Aphrodite took the dove under her wing and made it her sacred bird.

Because of her connections to the sea, Aphrodite was associated with water fowl, including swans, geese, and ducks. Aphrodite's other symbols included the sea, conch shells, and roses. The rose and myrtle flowers were both sacred to Aphrodite. A myth explaining the origin of Aphrodite's connection to myrtle goes that originally the myrtle was a maiden, Myrina, a dedicated priestess of Aphrodite. When her previous betrothed carried her away from the temple to marry her, Myrina killed him, and Aphrodite turned her into a myrtle, forever under her protection. Her most important fruit emblem was the apple, and in myth, she turned Melos, childhood friend and kin-in-law to Adonis, into an apple after he killed himself, mourning over Adonis' death. Likewise, Melos's wife Pelia was turned into a dove. She was associated with pomegranates, possibly because the red seeds suggested sexuality or because Greek women sometimes used pomegranates as a method of birth control. In Greek art, Aphrodite is often accompanied by dolphins and Nereids.

=== In classical art ===
A scene of Aphrodite rising from the sea appears on the back of the Ludovisi Throne (c. 460 BC), which was probably originally part of a massive altar that was constructed as part of the Ionic temple to Aphrodite in the Greek polis of Locri Epizephyrii in Magna Graecia in southern Italy. The throne shows Aphrodite rising from the sea, clad in a diaphanous garment, which is drenched with seawater and clinging to her body, revealing her upturned breasts and the outline of her navel. Her hair hangs dripping as she reaches to two attendants standing barefoot on the rocky shore on either side of her, lifting her out of the water. Scenes with Aphrodite appear in works of classical Greek pottery, including a famous white-ground kylix by the Pistoxenos Painter dating the between c. 470 and 460 BC, showing her riding on a swan or goose.

In c. 364/361 BC, the Athenian sculptor Praxiteles carved the marble statue Aphrodite of Knidos, which Pliny the Elder later praised as the greatest sculpture ever made. The statue showed a nude Aphrodite modestly covering her pubic region while resting against a water pot with her robe draped over it for support. The Aphrodite of Knidos was the first full-sized statue to depict Aphrodite completely naked and one of the first sculptures that was intended to be viewed from all sides. The statue was purchased by the people of Knidos in around 350 BC and proved to be tremendously influential on later depictions of Aphrodite. The original sculpture has been lost, but written descriptions of it as well several depictions of it on coins are still extant and over sixty copies, small-scale models, and fragments of it have been identified.

The Greek painter Apelles of Kos, a contemporary of Praxiteles, produced the panel painting Aphrodite Anadyomene (Aphrodite Rising from the Sea). According to Athenaeus, Apelles was inspired to paint the painting after watching the courtesan Phryne take off her clothes, untie her hair, and bathe naked in the sea at Eleusis. The painting was displayed in the Asclepeion on the island of Kos. The Aphrodite Anadyomene went unnoticed for centuries, but Pliny the Elder records that, in his own time, it was regarded as Apelles's most famous work.

During the Hellenistic and Roman periods, statues depicting Aphrodite proliferated; many of these statues were modeled at least to some extent on Praxiteles's Aphrodite of Knidos. Some statues show Aphrodite crouching naked; others show her wringing water out of her hair as she rises from the sea. Another common type of statue is known as Aphrodite Kallipygos, the name of which is Greek for "Aphrodite of the Beautiful Buttocks"; this type of sculpture shows Aphrodite lifting her peplos to display her buttocks to the viewer while looking back at them from over her shoulder. The ancient Romans produced massive numbers of copies of Greek sculptures of Aphrodite and more sculptures of Aphrodite have survived from antiquity than of any other deity.

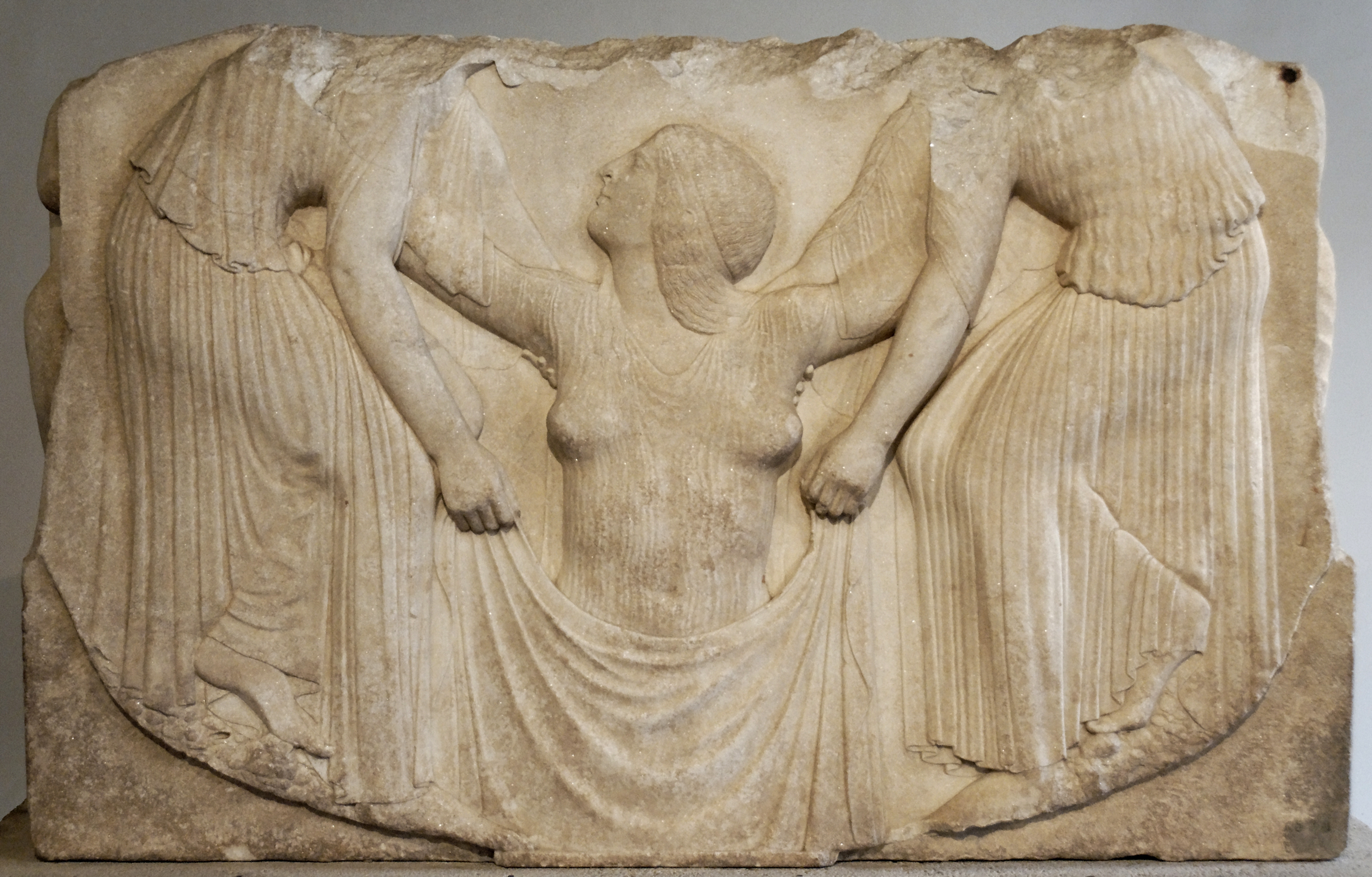
The Ludovisi Throne (possibly c. 460 BC) is believed to be a classical Greek bas-relief, although it has been alleged to be a 19th-century forgery.

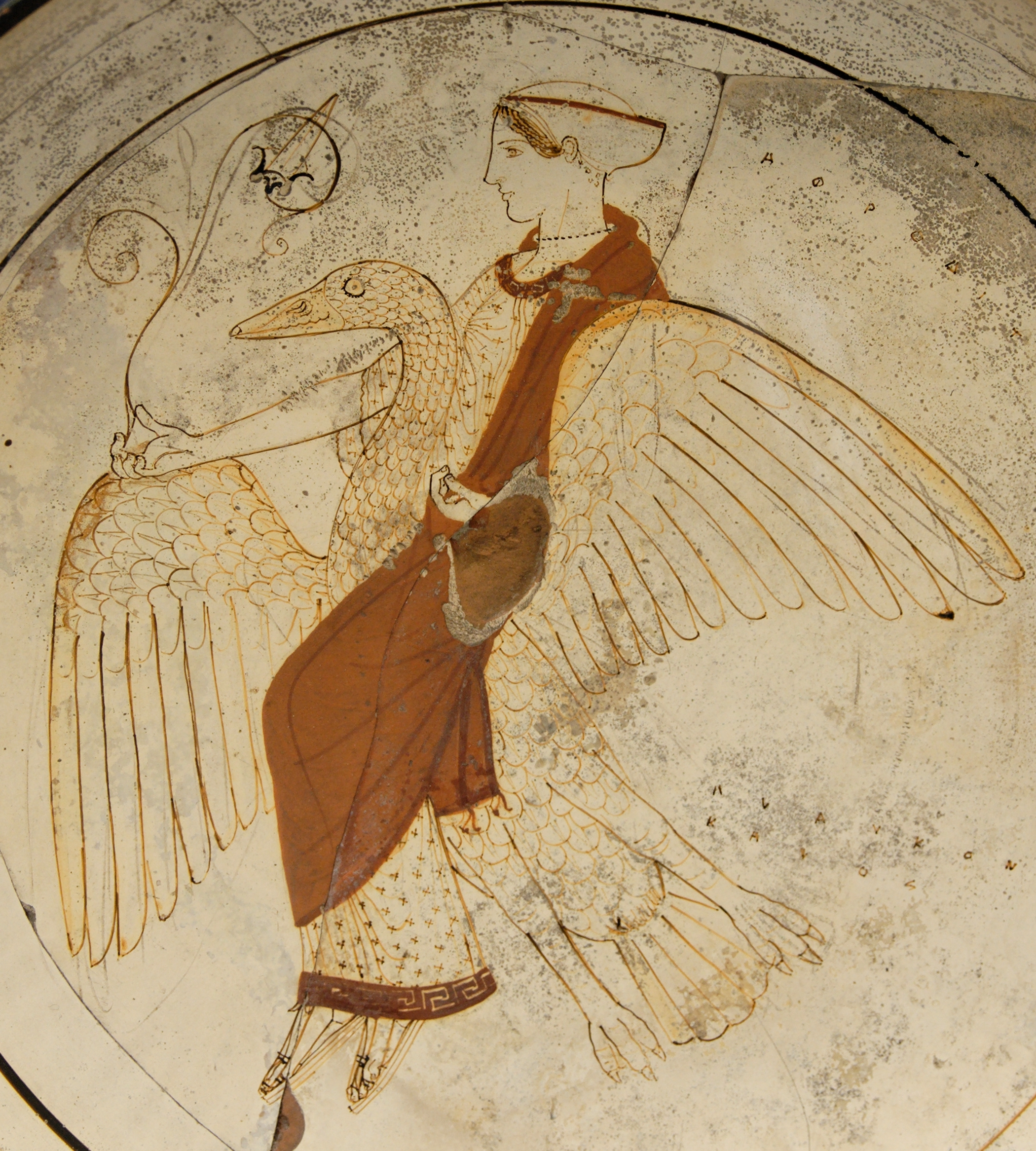
Attic white-ground red-figured kylix of Aphrodite riding a swan (c. 46-470) found at Kameiros (Rhodes)

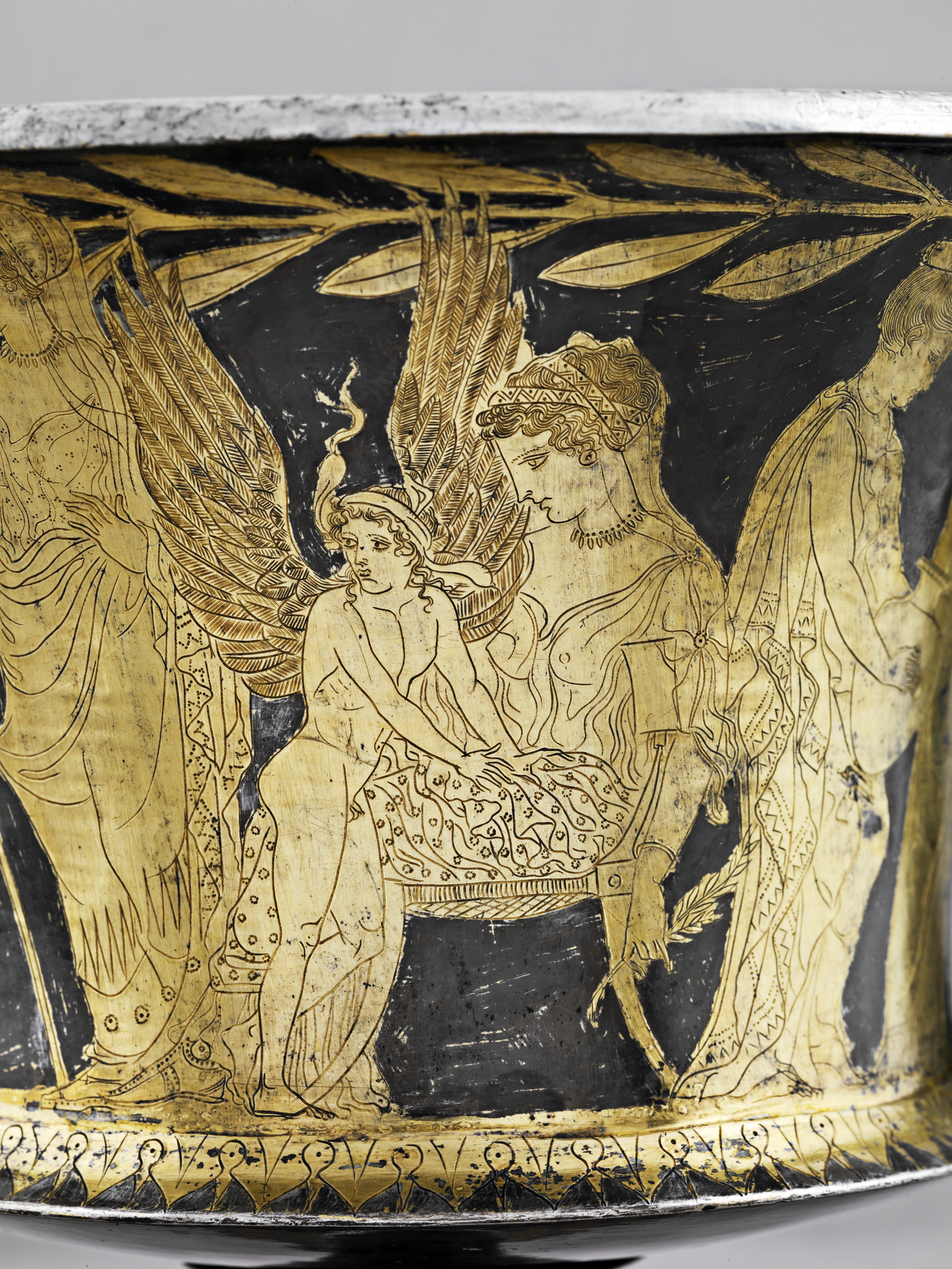
Aphrodite and Himeros, detail from a silver kantharos (c. 420-410 BC), Vassil Bojkov collection, Sofia, Bulgaria

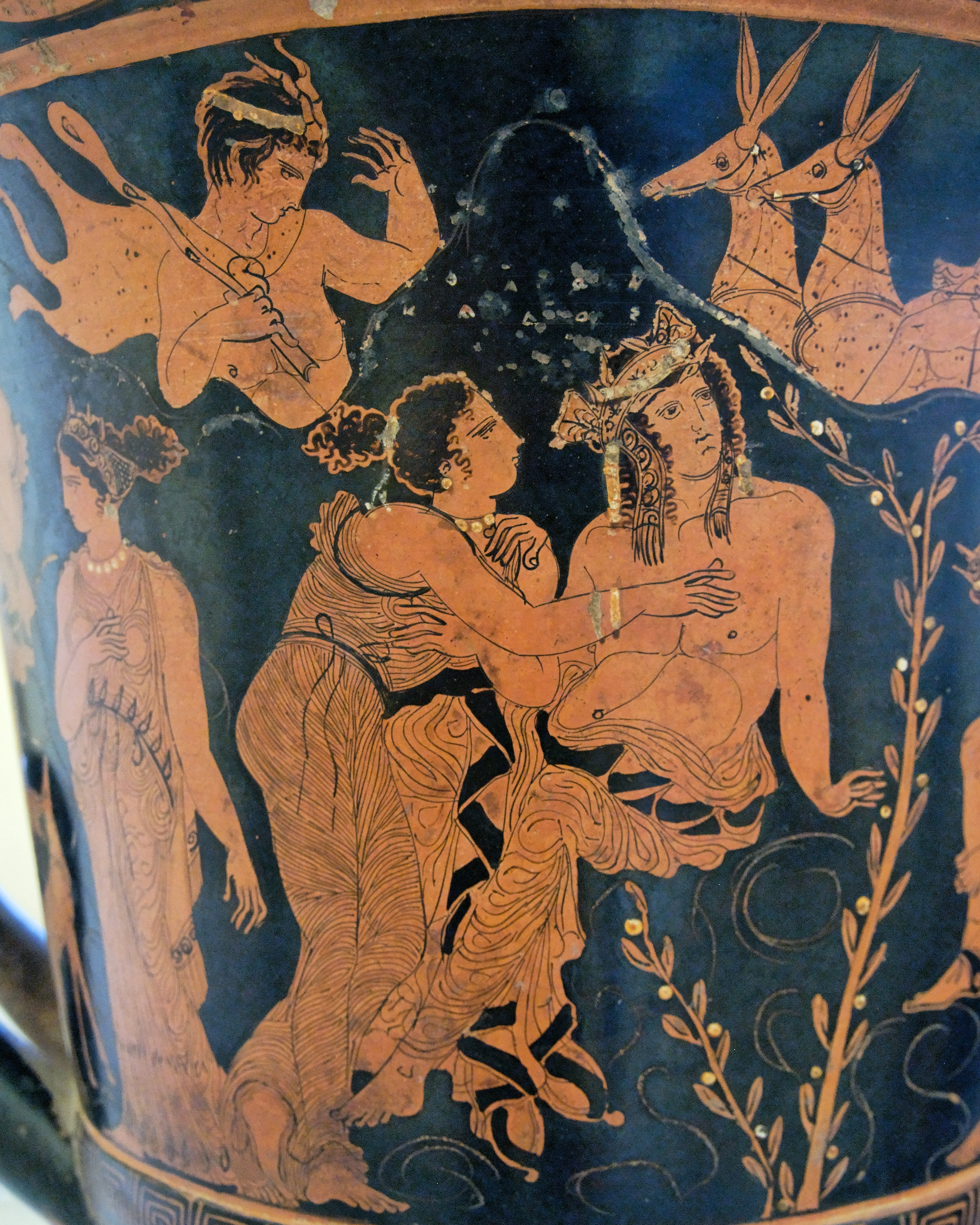
Red-figure vase painting of Aphrodite and Phaon (c. 420-400 BC)

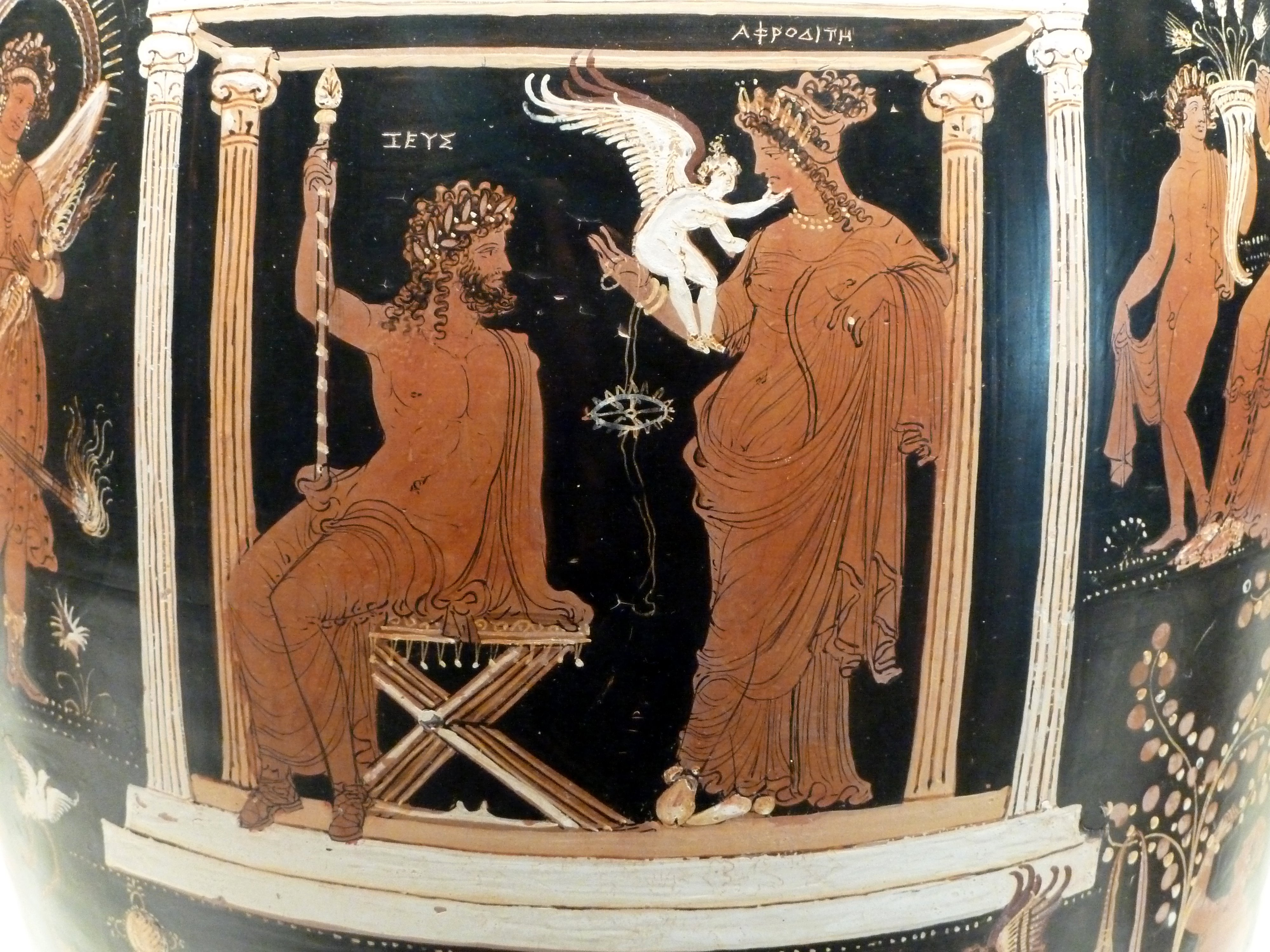
Apuleian vase painting of Zeus plotting with Aphrodite to seduce Leda while Eros sits on her arm (c. 330 BC)

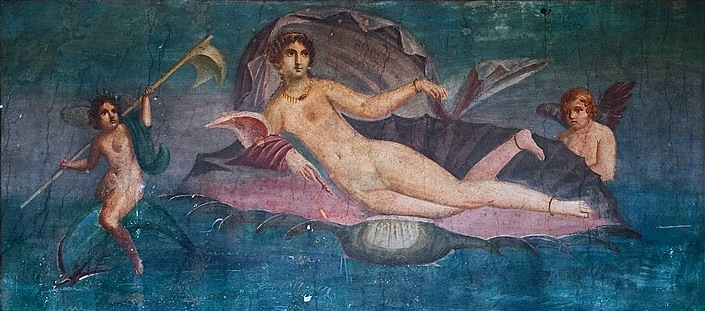
Venus rising from the sea on a scallop shell. Fresco, Pompeii

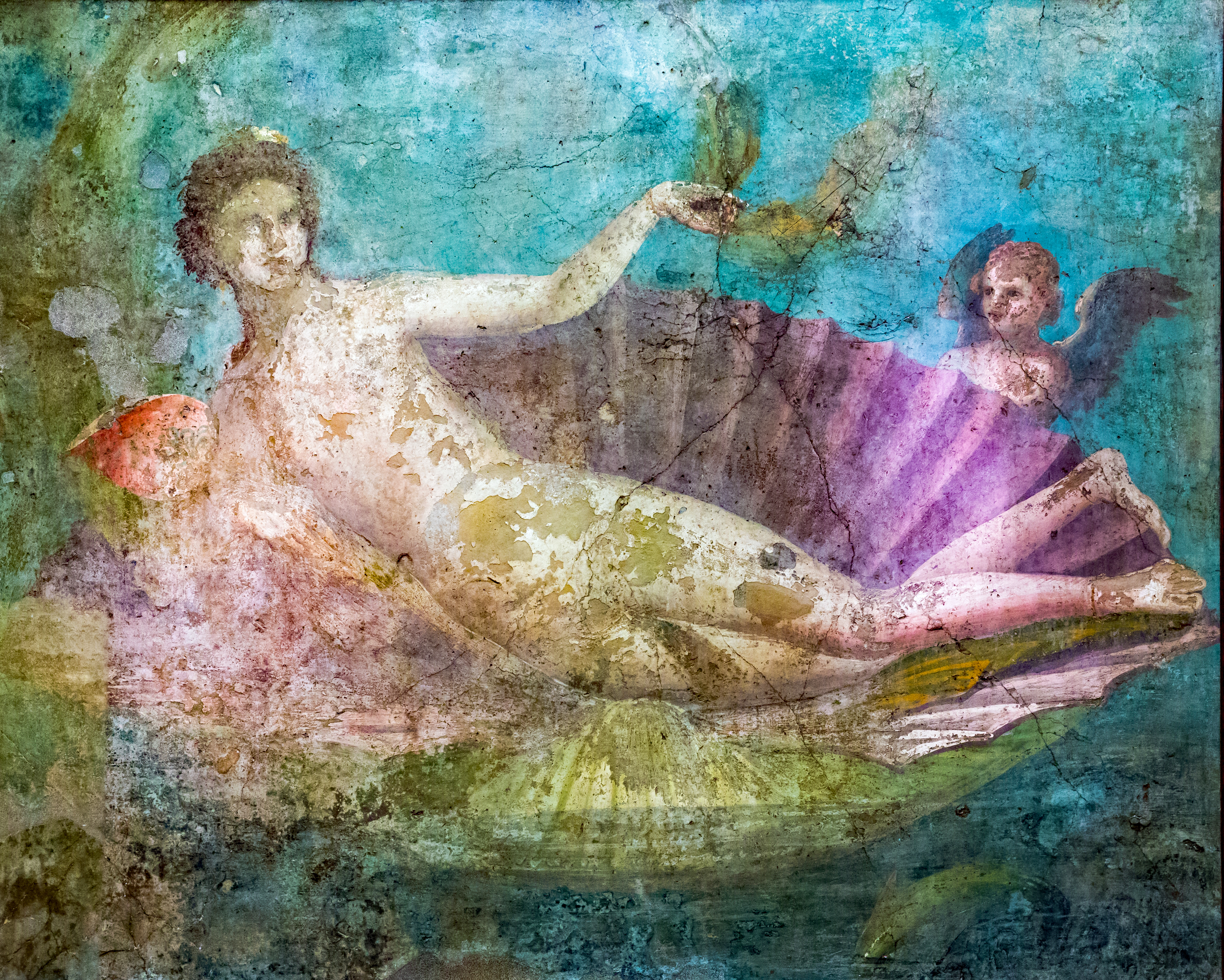
Birth of Venus from a shell, c. 50–79 AD. Fresco, Pompeii
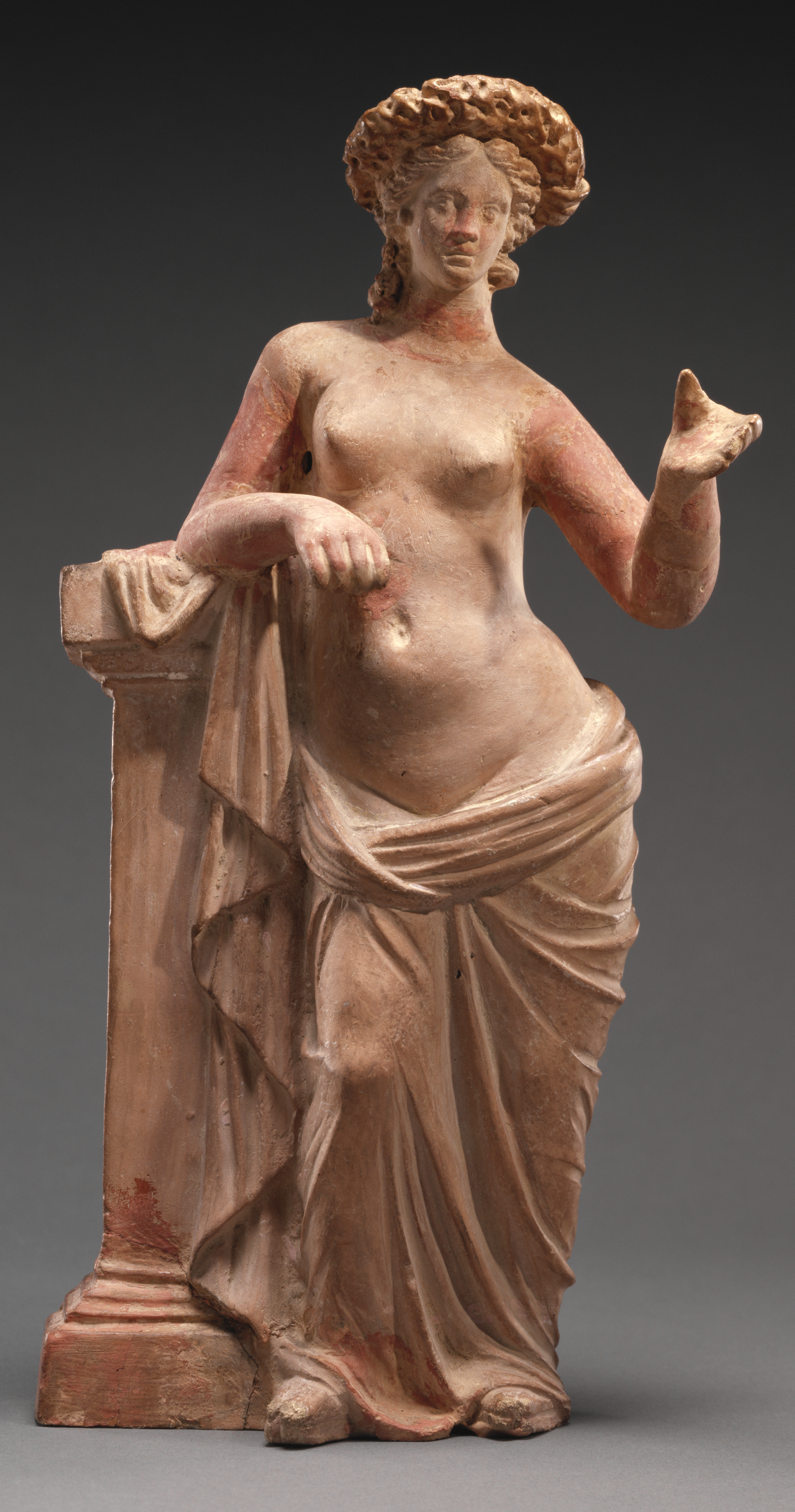
Aphrodite Leaning Against a Pillar (third century BC)

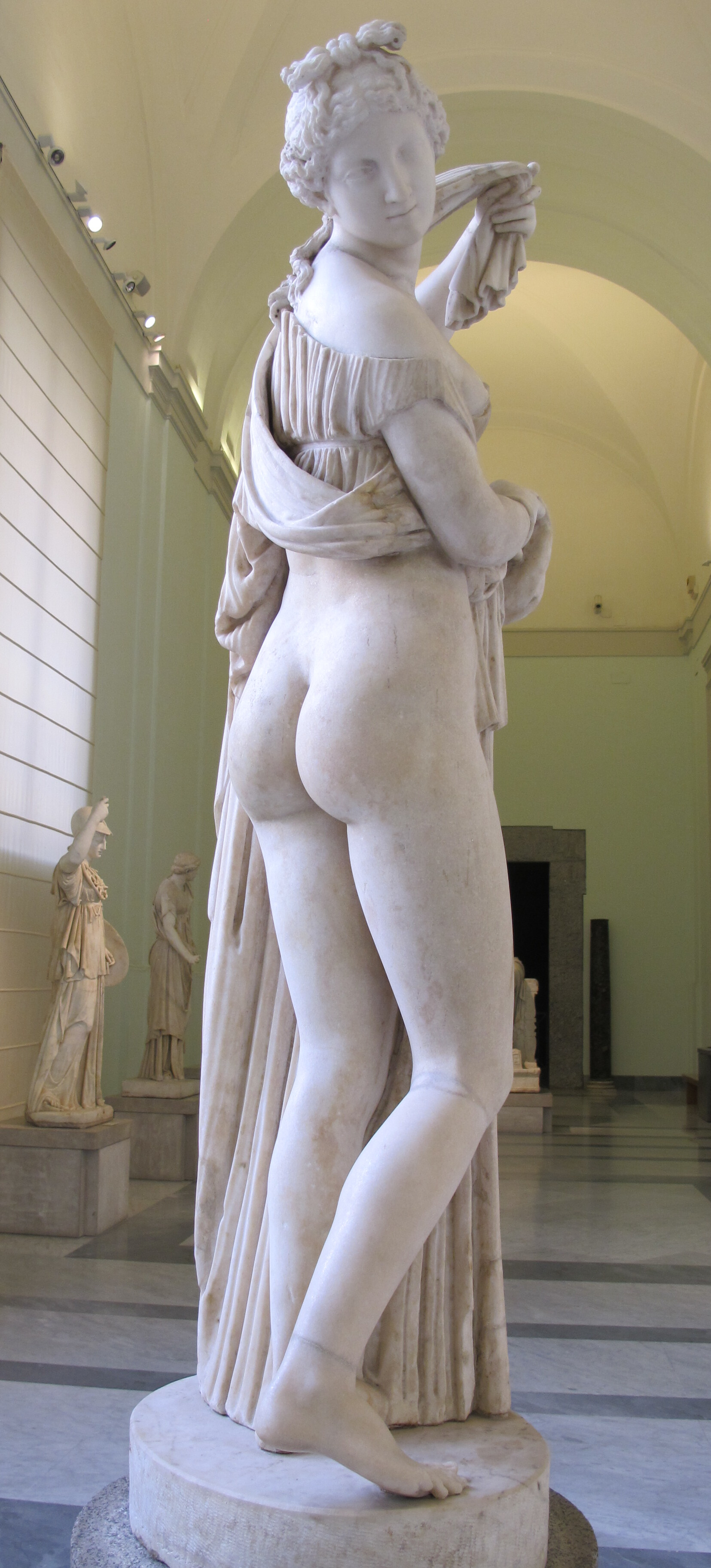
Aphrodite Kallipygos ("Aphrodite of the Beautiful Buttocks")

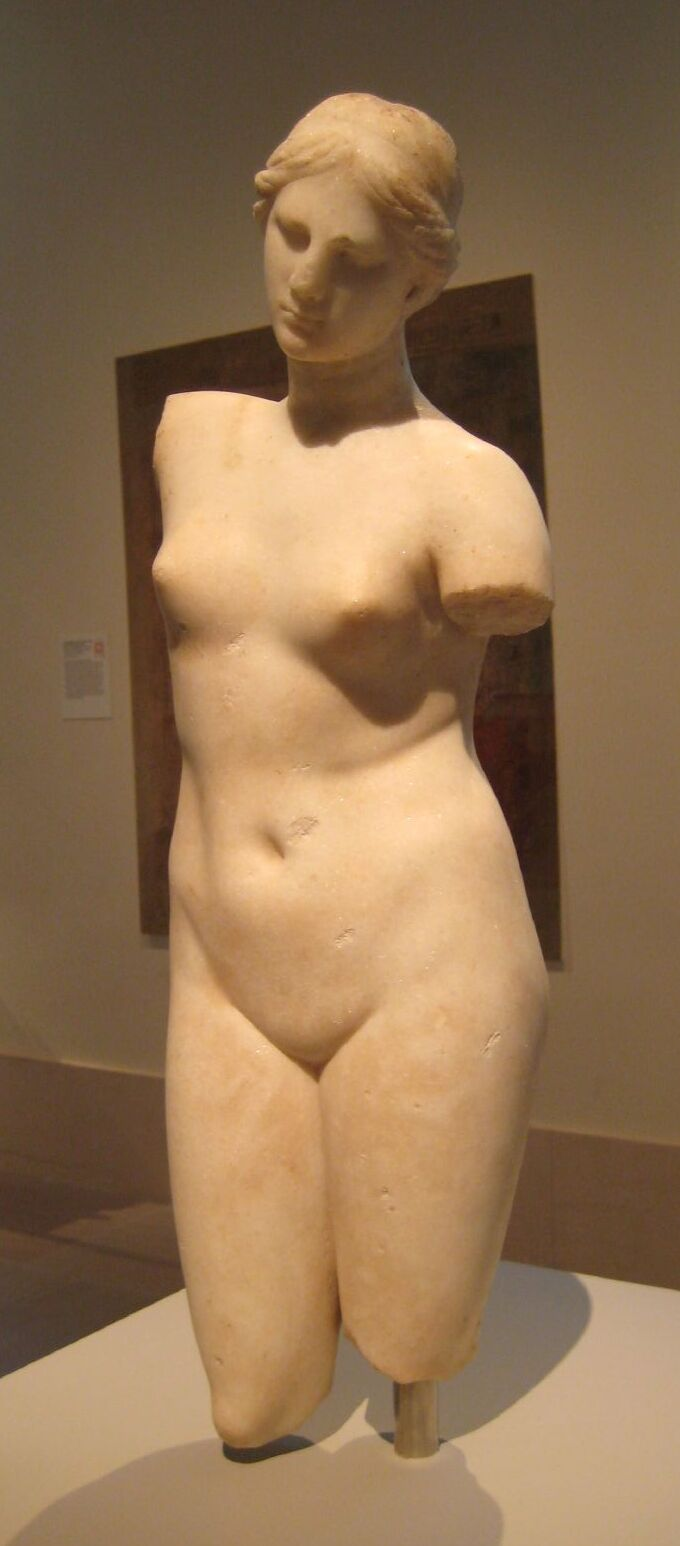
Aphrodite Binding Her Hair (second century BC)

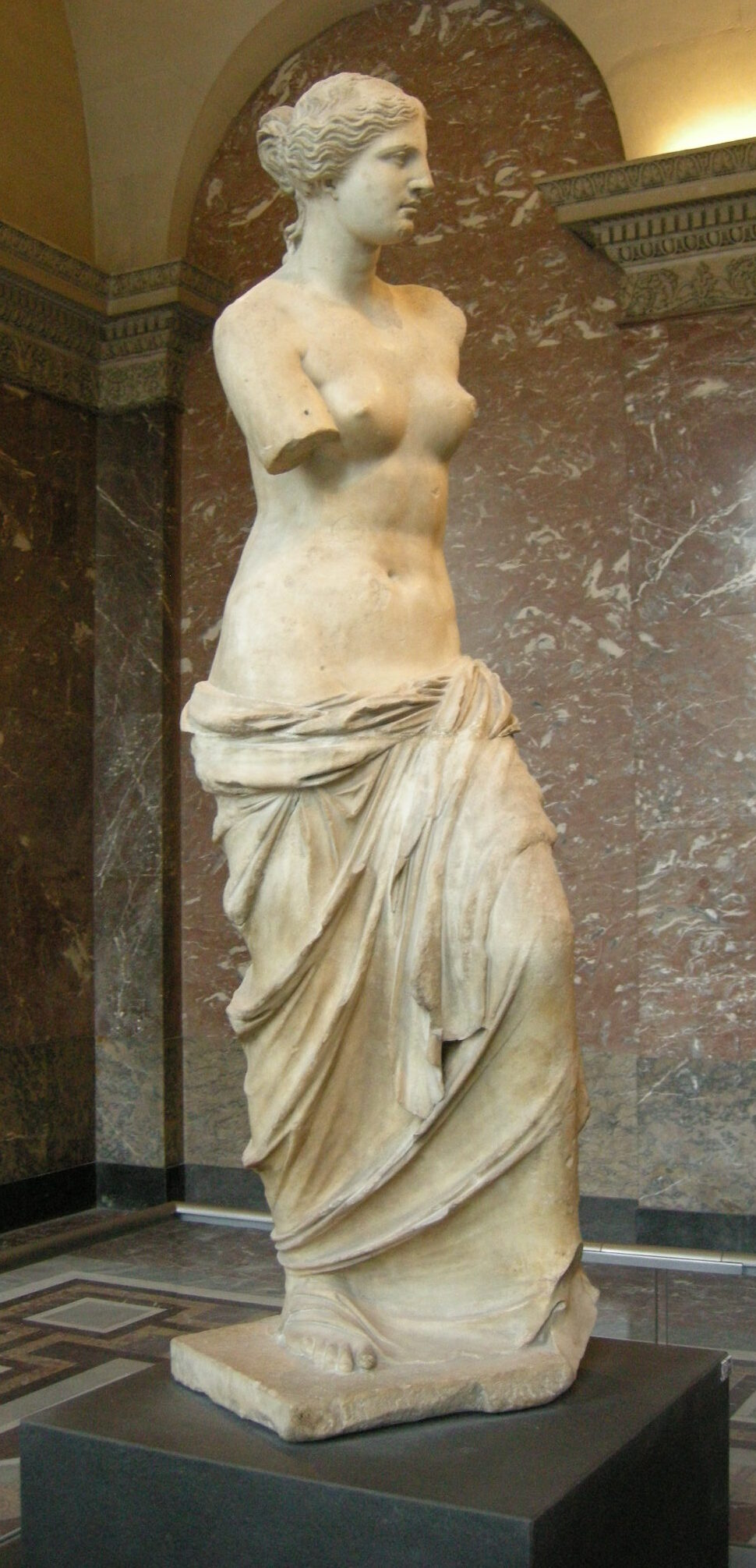
Aphrodite of Milos (c. 100 BC), Louvre

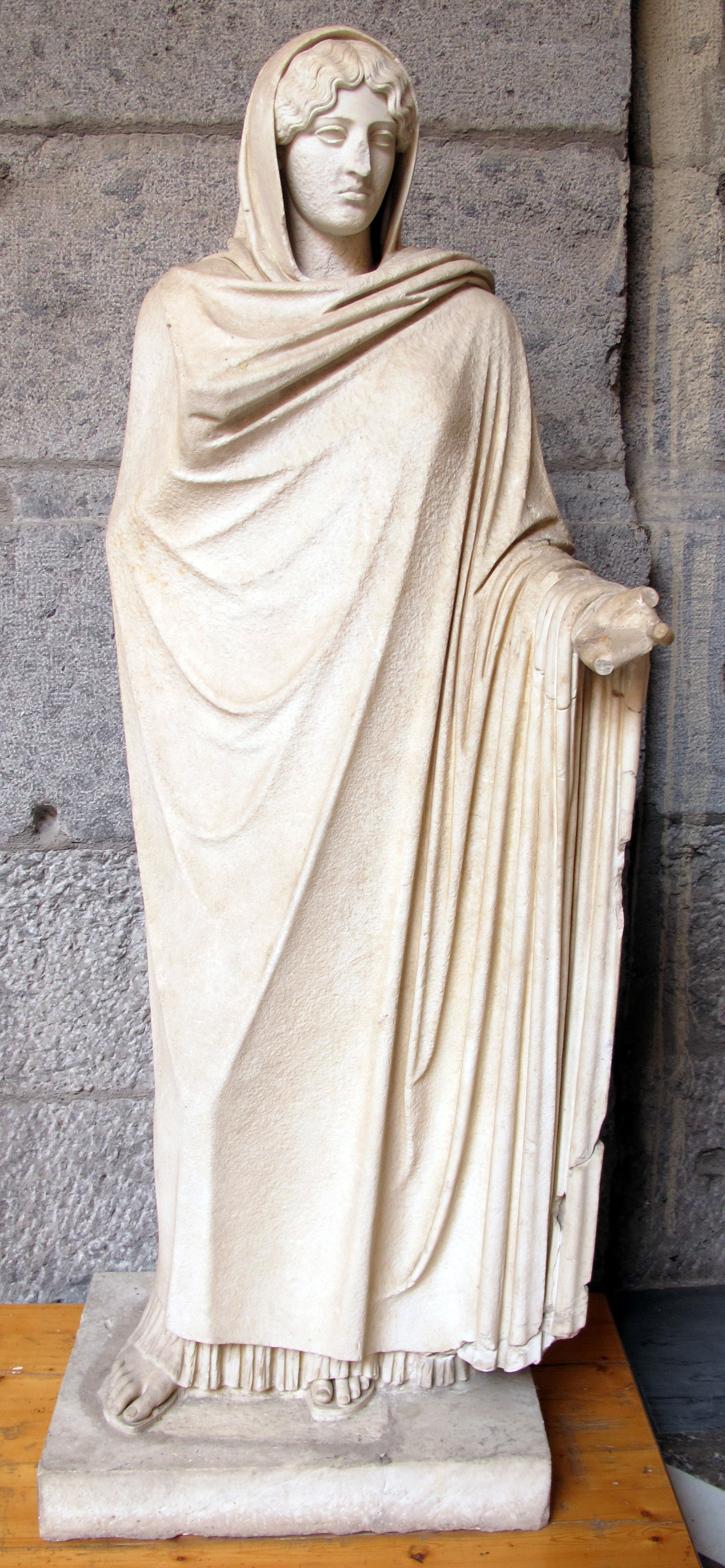
Aphrodite Sosandra (Roman copan copy of 5th century BC)

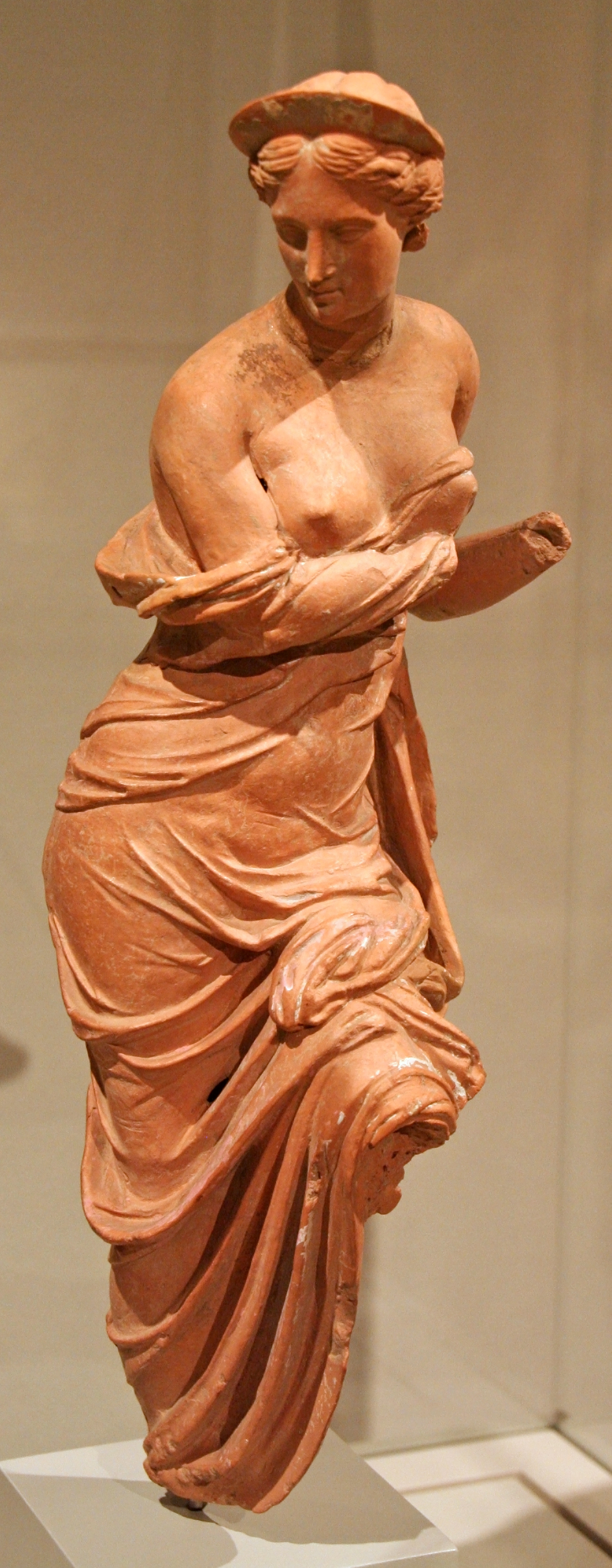
Aphrodite Heyl (second century BC)

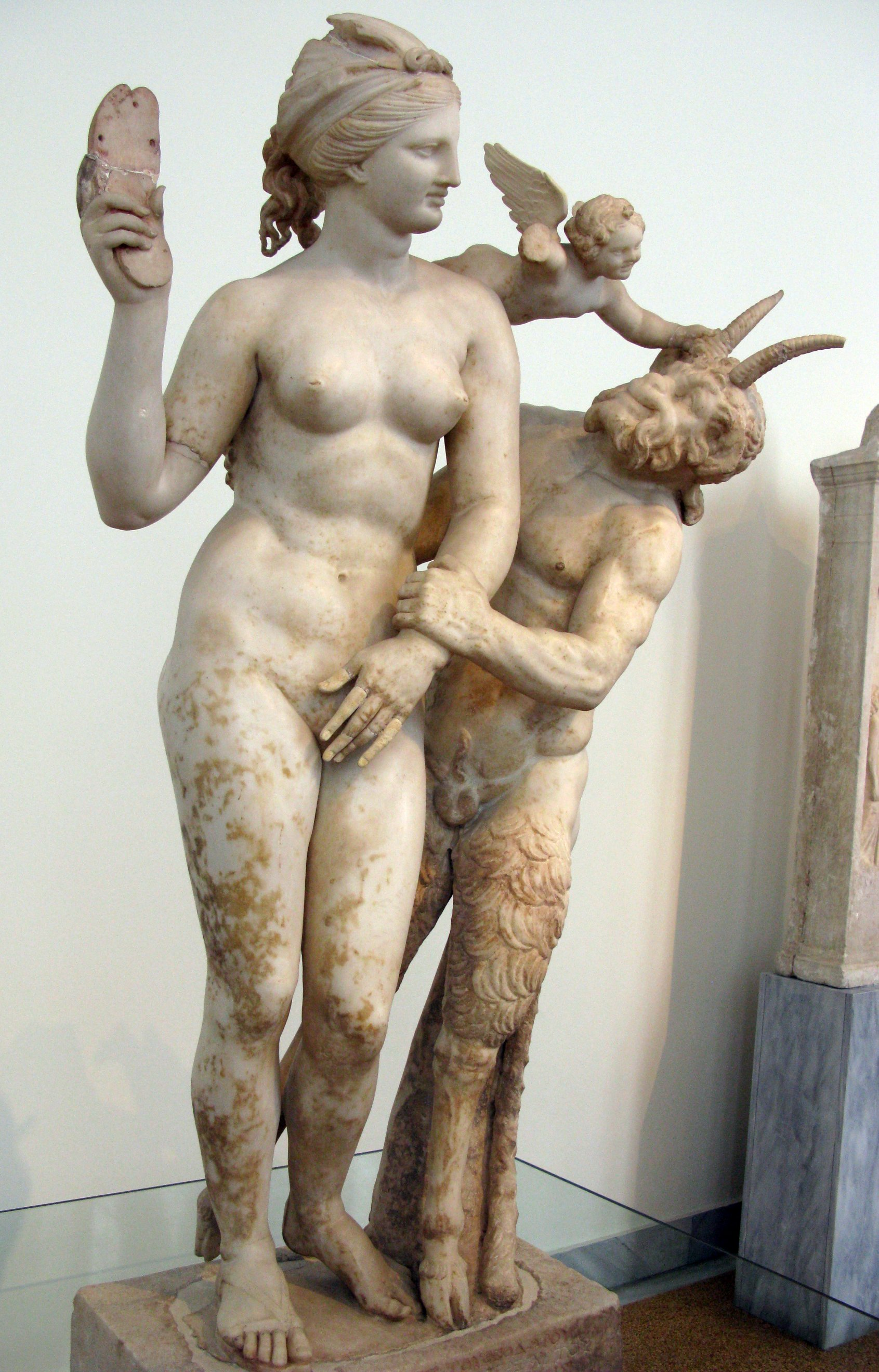
Greek sculpture group of Aphrodite, Pan and Eros (c. 100 BC)

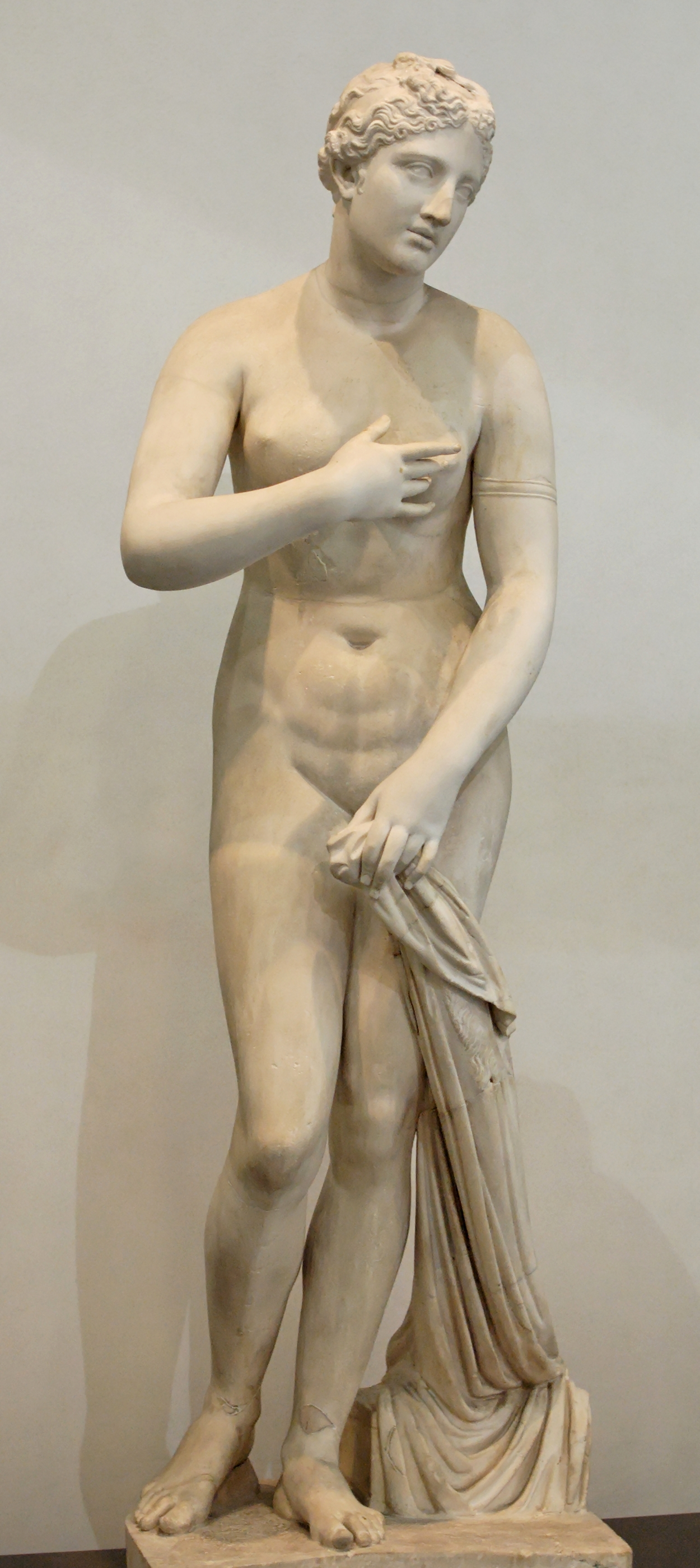
Aphrodite of Menophantos (first century BC)

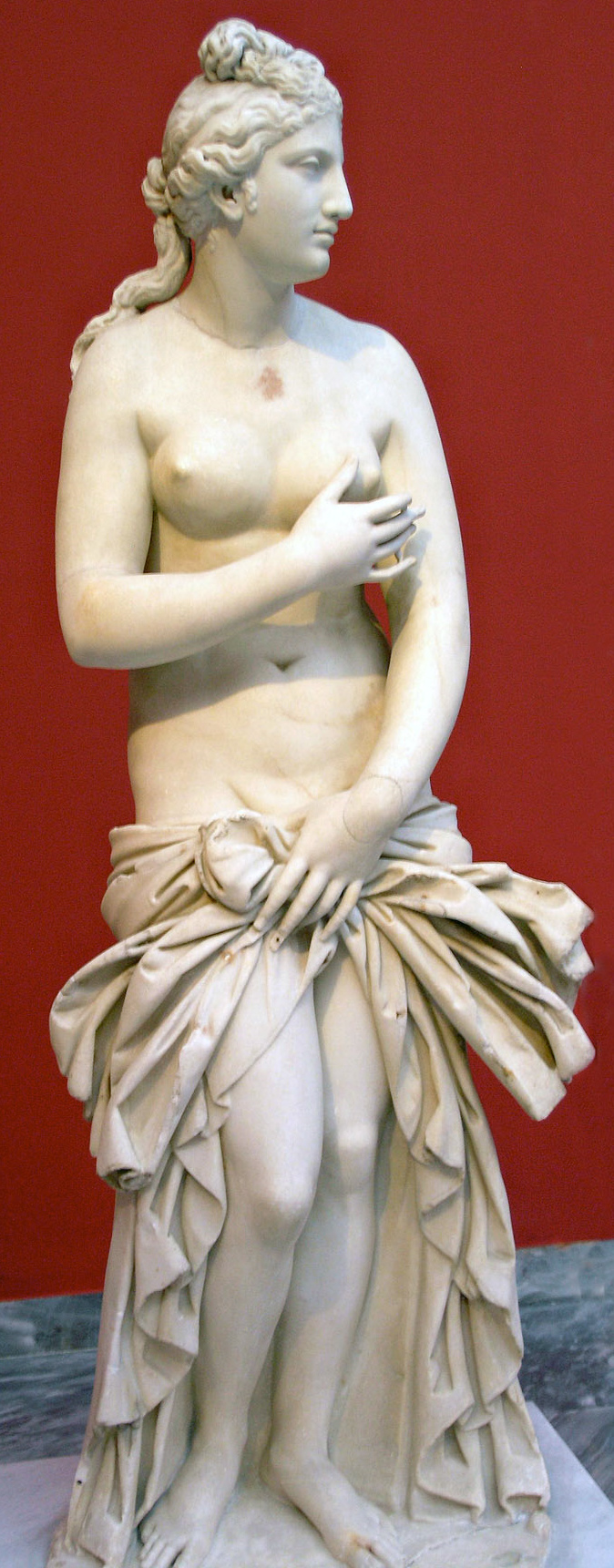
Aphrodite of Syracuse (Roman copy of 2nd century AD), NAMA.

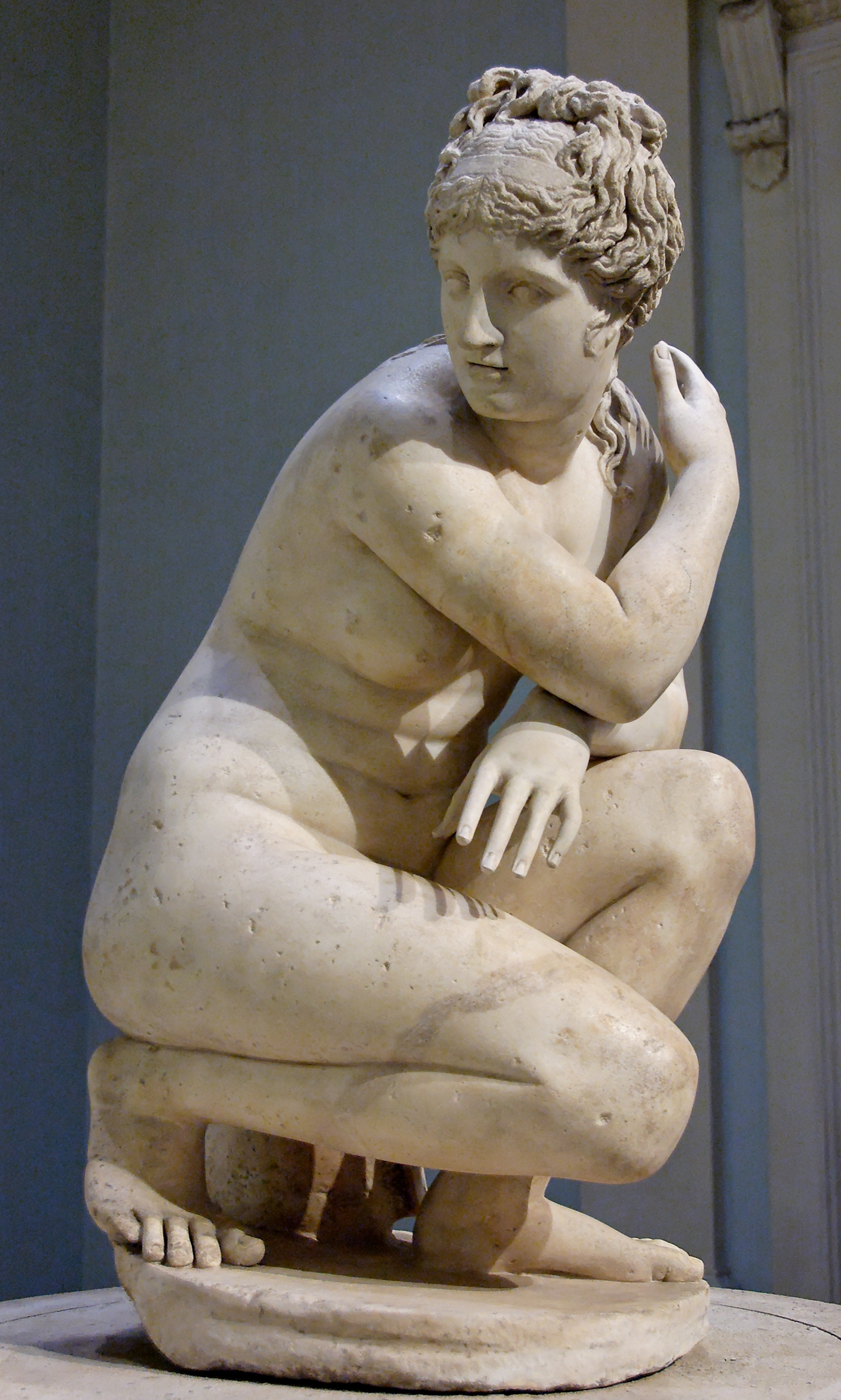
The Lely Venus (c. second century AD)

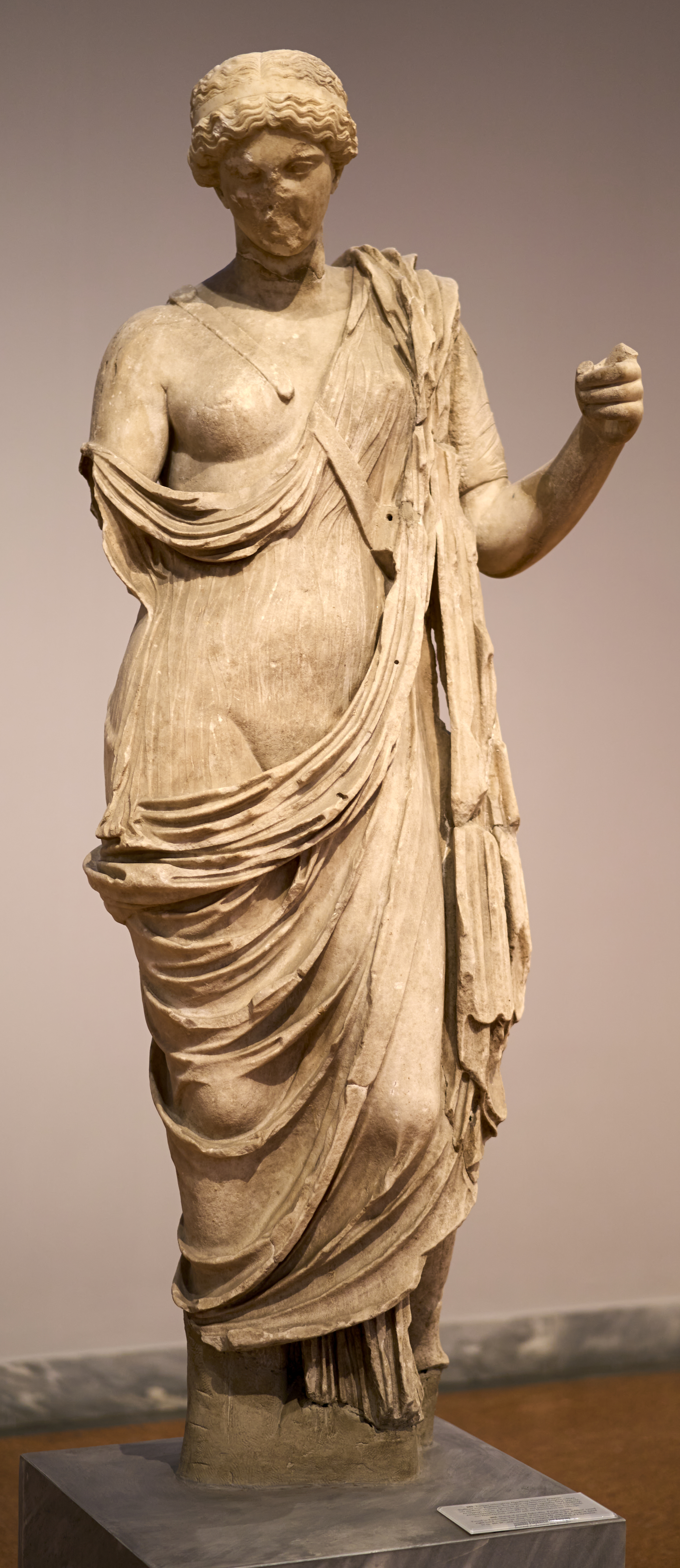
Aphrodite Areia Roman copy, NAMA.

== Post-classical culture ==
=== Middle Ages ===
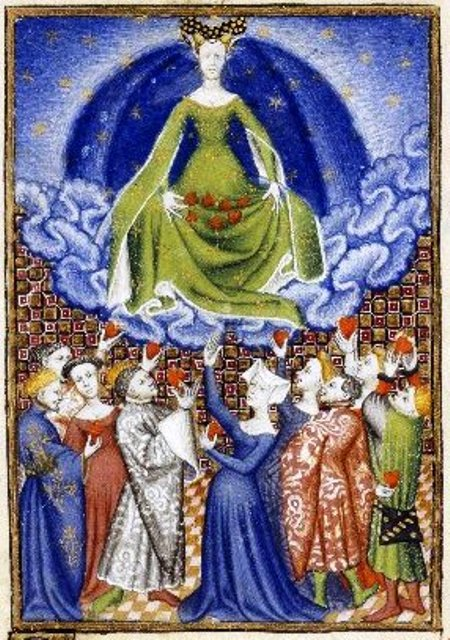
Fifteenth century manuscript illumination of Venus, sitting on a rainbow, with her devotees offering her their hearts

Early Christians frequently adapted pagan iconography to suit Christian purposes. In the Early Middle Ages, Christians adapted elements of Aphrodite/Venus's iconography and applied them to Eve and prostitutes, and to female saints and even the Virgin Mary. Christians in the east reinterpreted the story of Aphrodite's birth as a metaphor for baptism; in a Coptic stele from the sixth century AD, a female orant is shown wearing Aphrodite's conch shell as a sign that she is newly baptized. Throughout the Middle Ages, villages and communities across Europe still maintained folk tales and traditions about Aphrodite/Venus and travelers reported a wide variety of stories. Numerous Roman mosaics of Venus survived in Britain, preserving memory of the pagan past. In North Africa in the late fifth century AD, Fulgentius of Ruspe encountered mosaics of Aphrodite and reinterpreted her as a symbol of the sin of Lust, arguing that she was shown naked because "the sin of lust is never cloaked" and that she was often shown "swimming" because "all lust suffers shipwreck of its affairs". He argued that she was associated with doves and conches because these are symbols of copulation, and that she was associated with roses because "as the rose gives pleasure, but is swept away by the swift movement of the seasons, so lust is pleasant for a moment, but is swept away forever."

While Fulgentius had appropriated Aphrodite as a symbol of Lust, Isidore of Seville (c. 560–636) interpreted her as a symbol of marital procreative sex and declared that the moral of the story of Aphrodite's birth is that sex can only be holy in the presence of semen, blood, and heat, which he regarded as all being necessary for procreation. Meanwhile, Isidore denigrated Aphrodite/Venus's son Eros/Cupid as a "demon of fornication" (daemon fornicationis). Aphrodite/Venus was best known to Western European scholars through her appearances in Virgil's Aeneid and Ovid's Metamorphoses. Venus is mentioned in the Latin poem Pervigilium Veneris ("The Eve of Saint Venus"), written in the third or fourth century AD, and in Giovanni Boccaccio's Genealogia Deorum Gentilium.

Since the Late Middle Ages. the myth of the Venusberg (German; French Mont de Vénus, "Mountain of Venus") – a subterranean realm ruled by Venus, hidden underneath Christian Europe – became a motif of European folklore in legends and epics. In German folklore of the 16th century, the narrative becomes associated with the minnesinger Tannhäuser, and in that form the myth was taken up in later literature and opera.

=== Art ===
Aphrodite is the central figure in Sandro Botticelli's painting Primavera, which has been described as "one of the most written about, and most controversial paintings in the world", and "one of the most popular paintings in Western art". The story of Aphrodite's birth from the foam was a popular subject matter for painters during the Italian Renaissance, who were attempting to consciously reconstruct Apelles of Kos's lost masterpiece Aphrodite Anadyomene based on the literary ekphrasis of it preserved by Cicero and Pliny the Elder. Artists drew inspiration from Ovid's description of the birth of Venus in his Metamorphoses. Sandro Botticelli's The Birth of Venus (c. 1485) was partially inspired by a description by Poliziano of a relief on the subject. Later Italian renditions of the same scene include Titian's Venus Anadyomene (c. 1525) and Raphael's painting in the Stufetta del cardinal Bibbiena (1516). Titian's biographer Giorgio Vasari identified all of Titian's paintings of naked women as paintings of "Venus", including an erotic painting from c. 1534, which he called the Venus of Urbino, although the painting contains none of Aphrodite/Venus's traditional iconography, and the woman is in a contemporary setting.

15th to 17th centuries

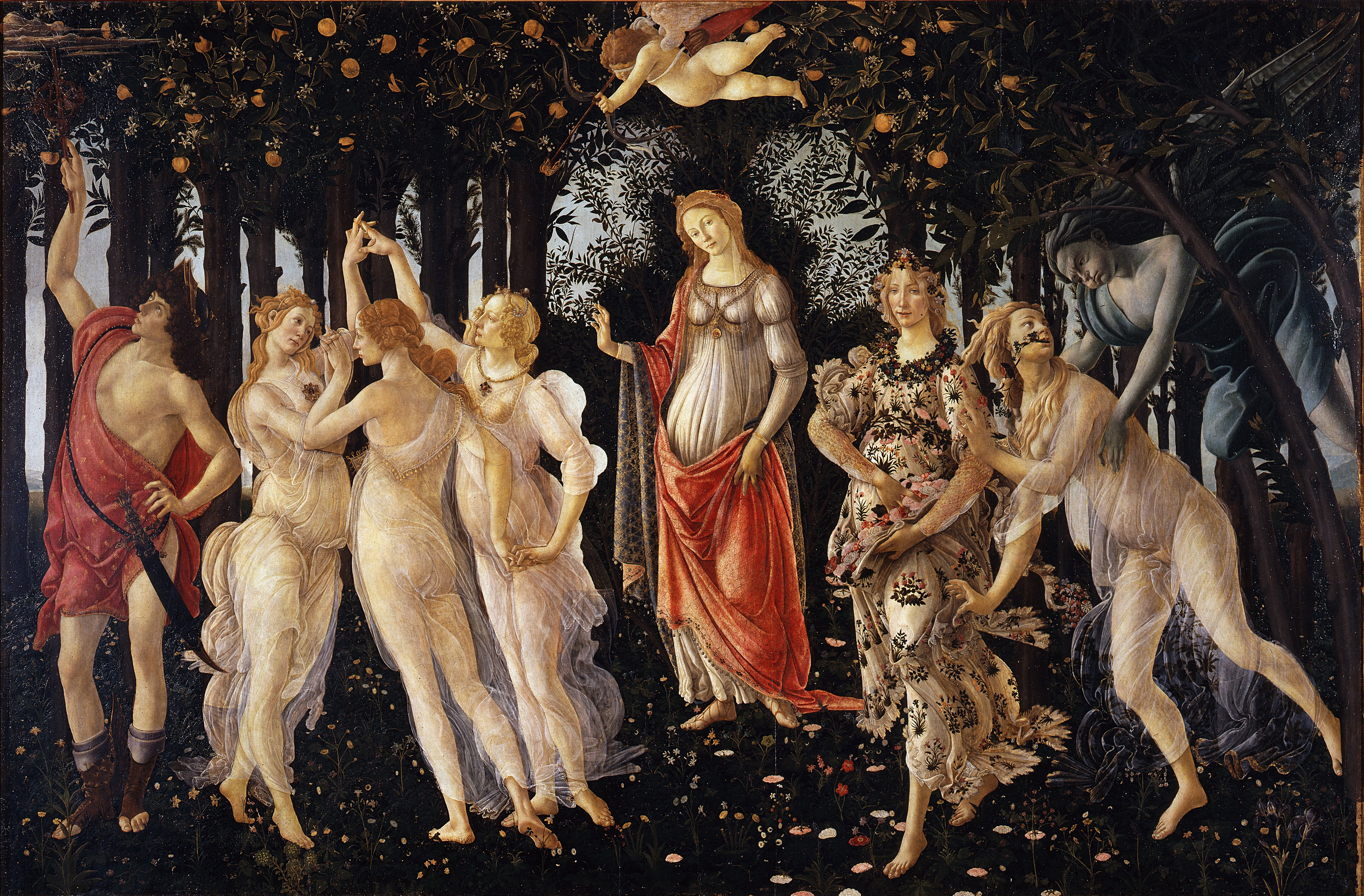
Primavera (late 1470s or early 1480s) by Sandro Botticelli

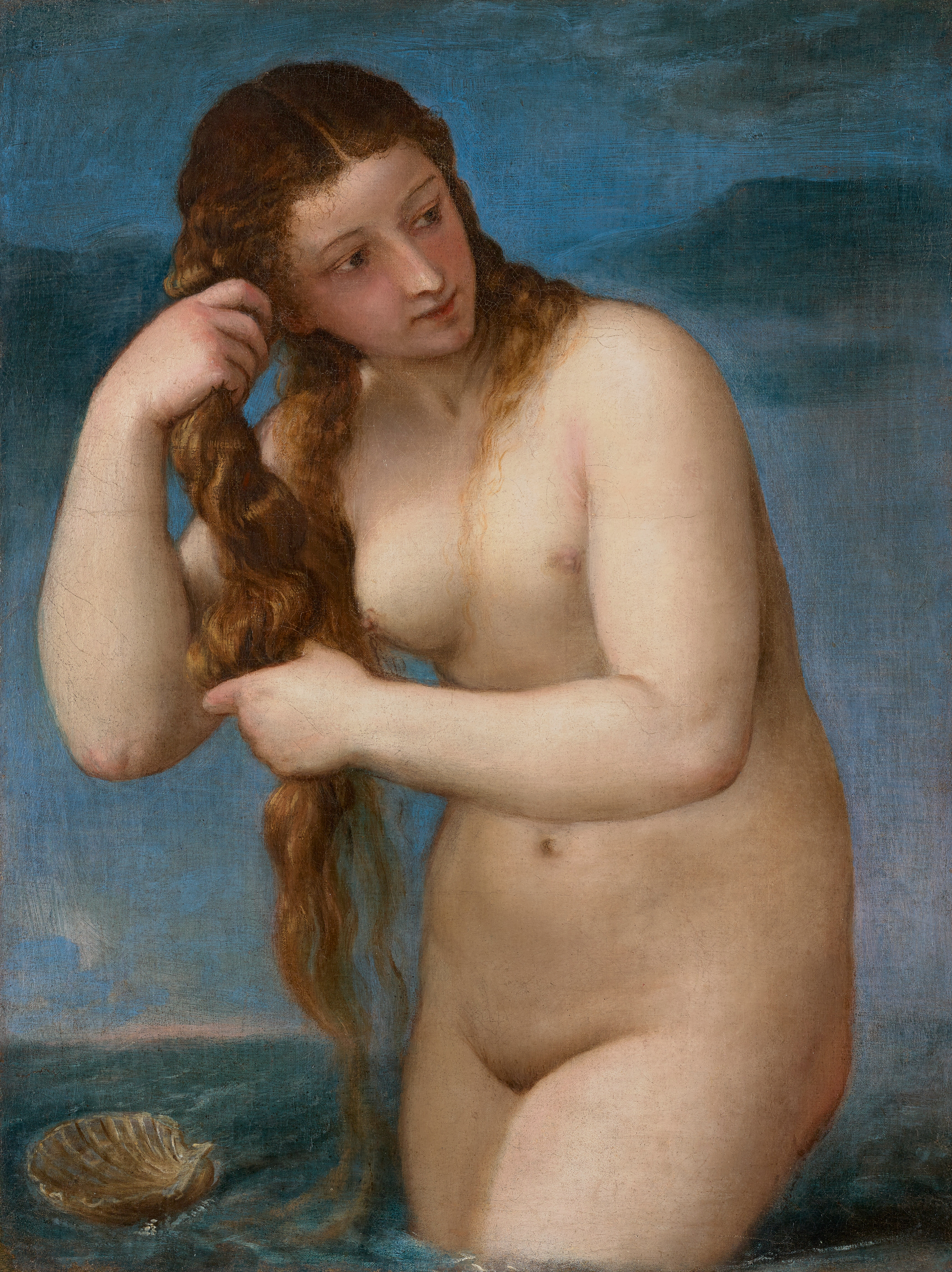
Venus Anadyomene (c. 1525) by Titian

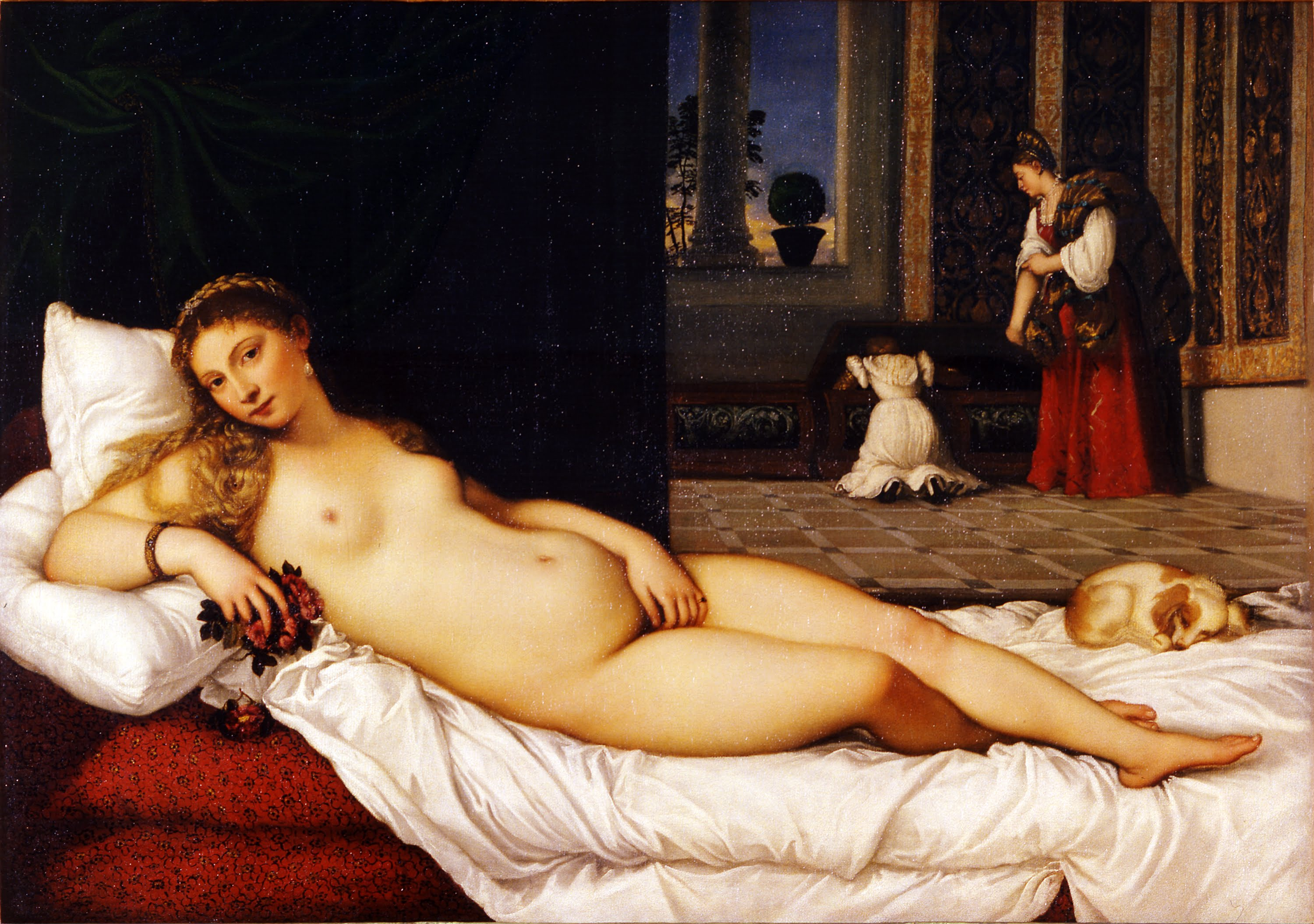
Venus of Urbino (c. 1534) by Titian

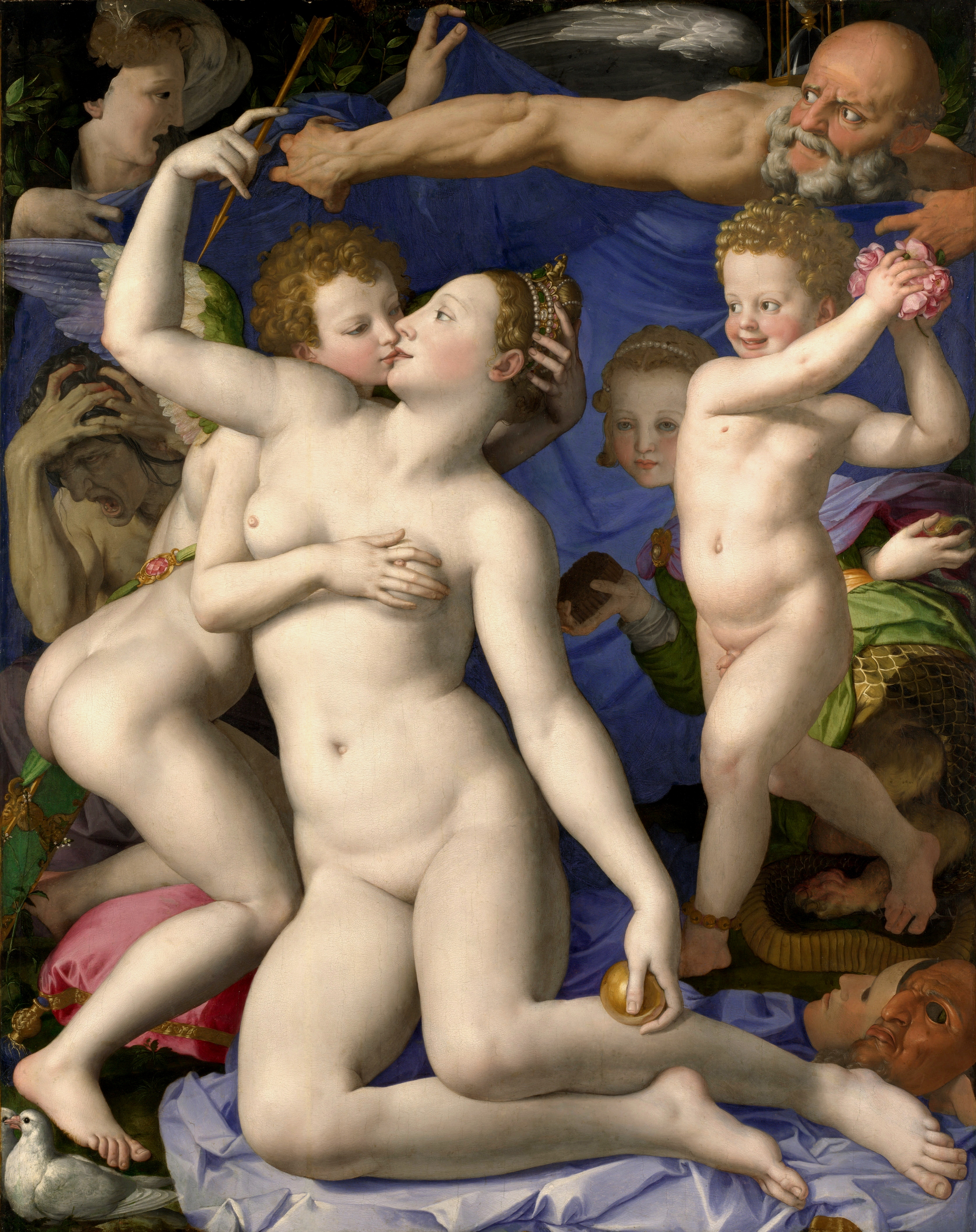
Venus, Cupid, Folly and Time (c. 1545) by Bronzino

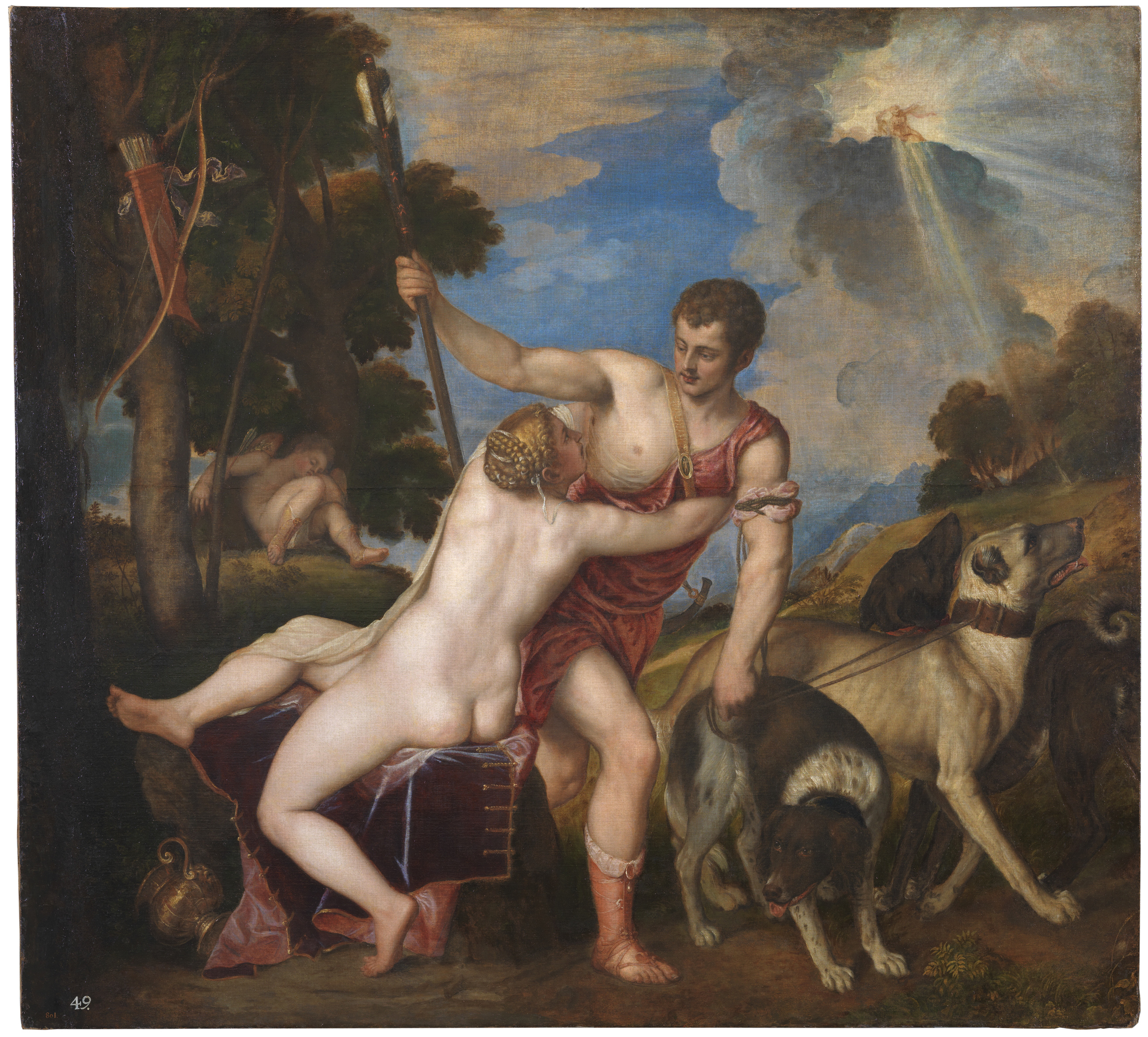
Venus and Adonis (1554) by Titian

Venus with a Mirror (c. 1555) by Titian

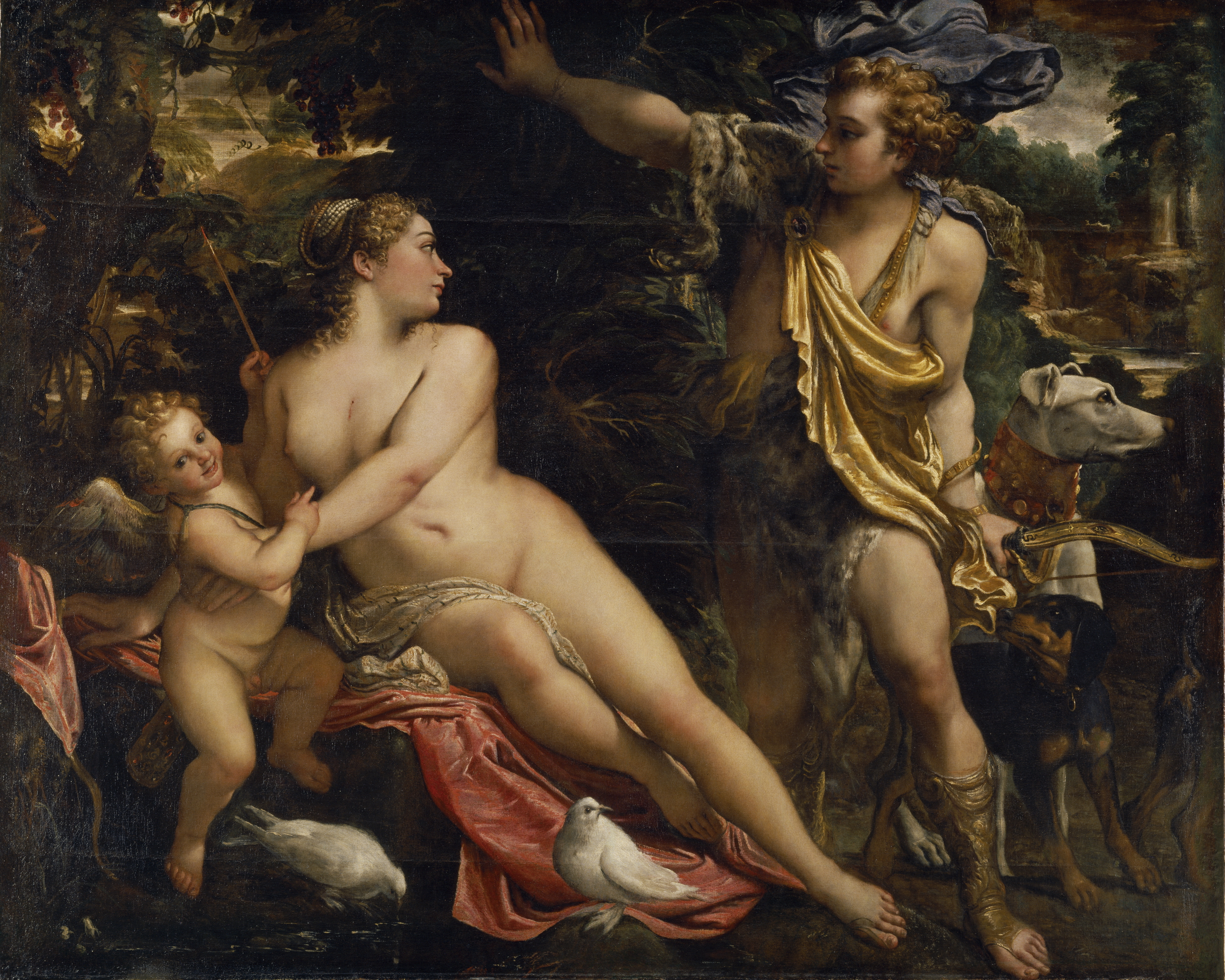
Venus, Adonis and Cupid (c. 1595) by Annibale Carracci

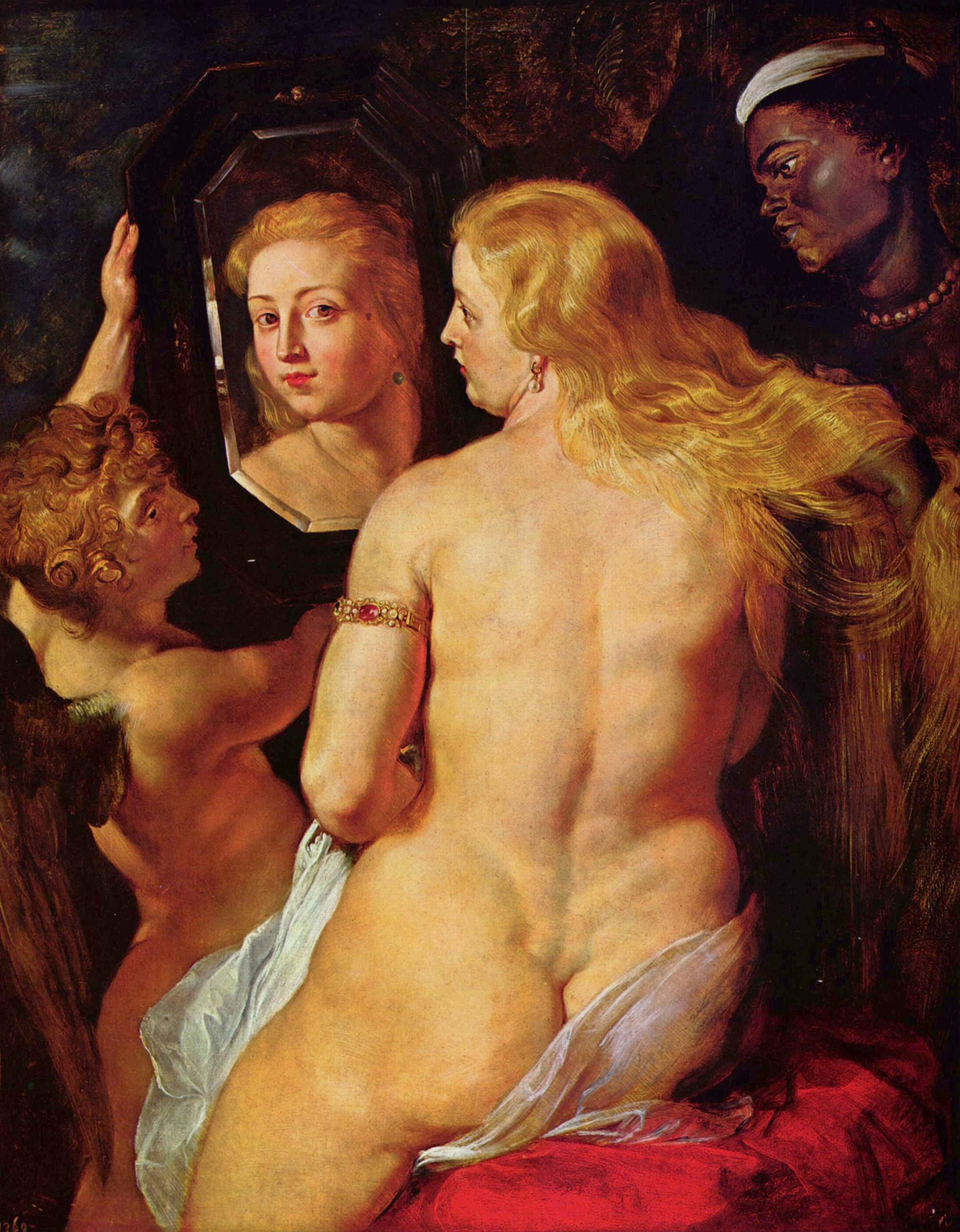
The Toilet of Venus (c. 1612–1615) by Peter Paul Rubens

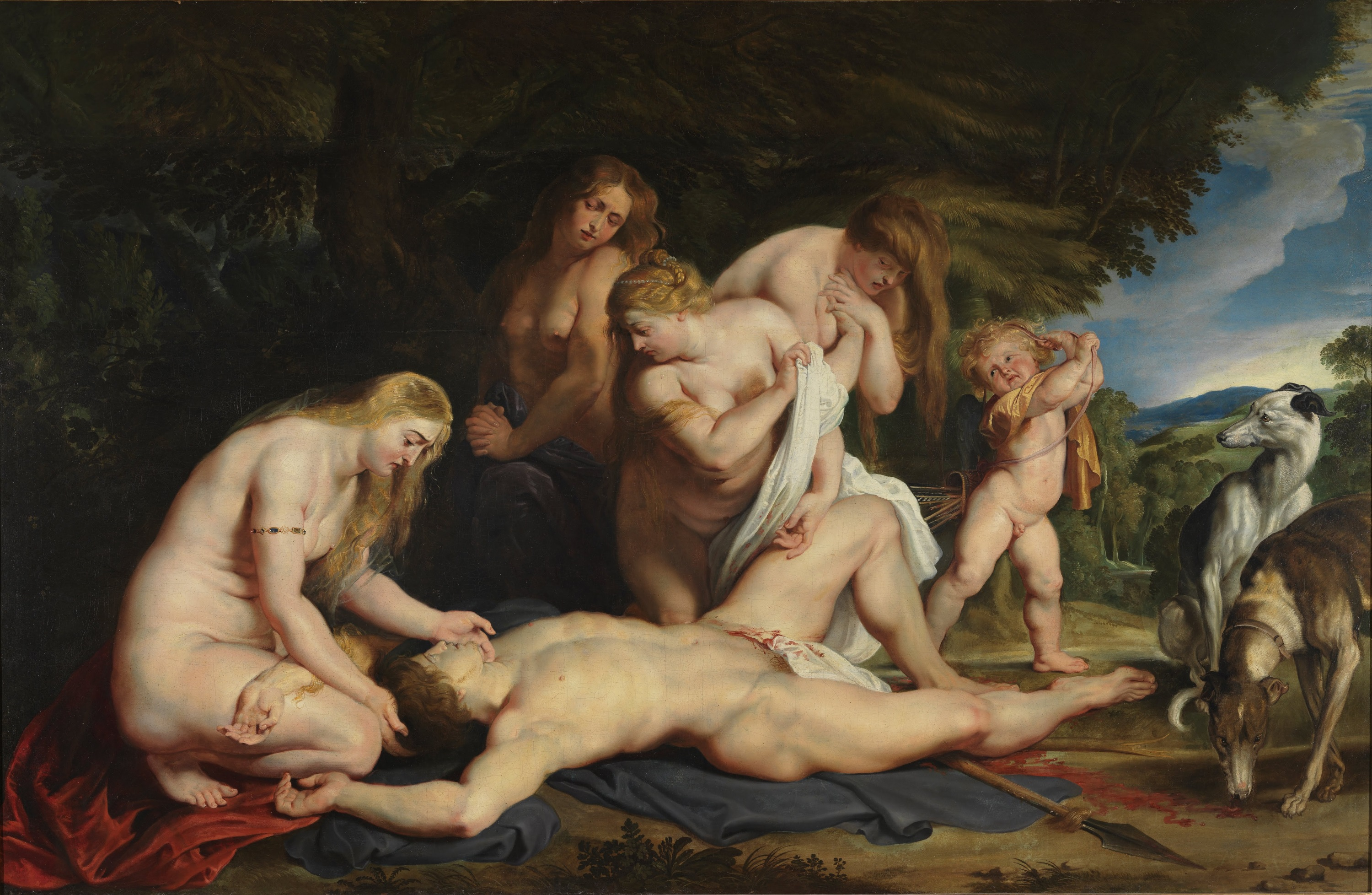
The Death of Adonis (c. 1614) by Peter Paul Rubens

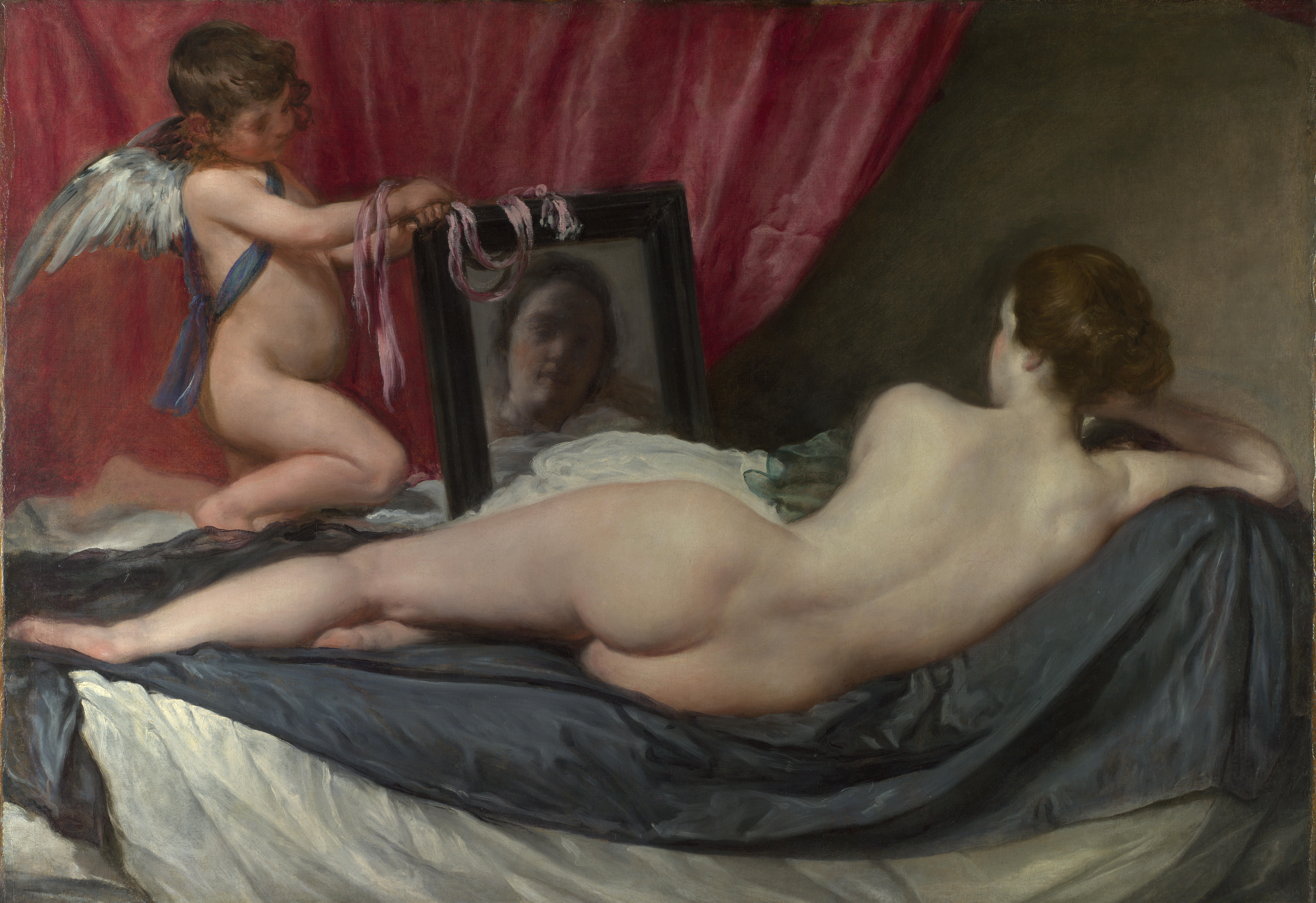
Rokeby Venus (c. 1647–51) by Diego Velázquez

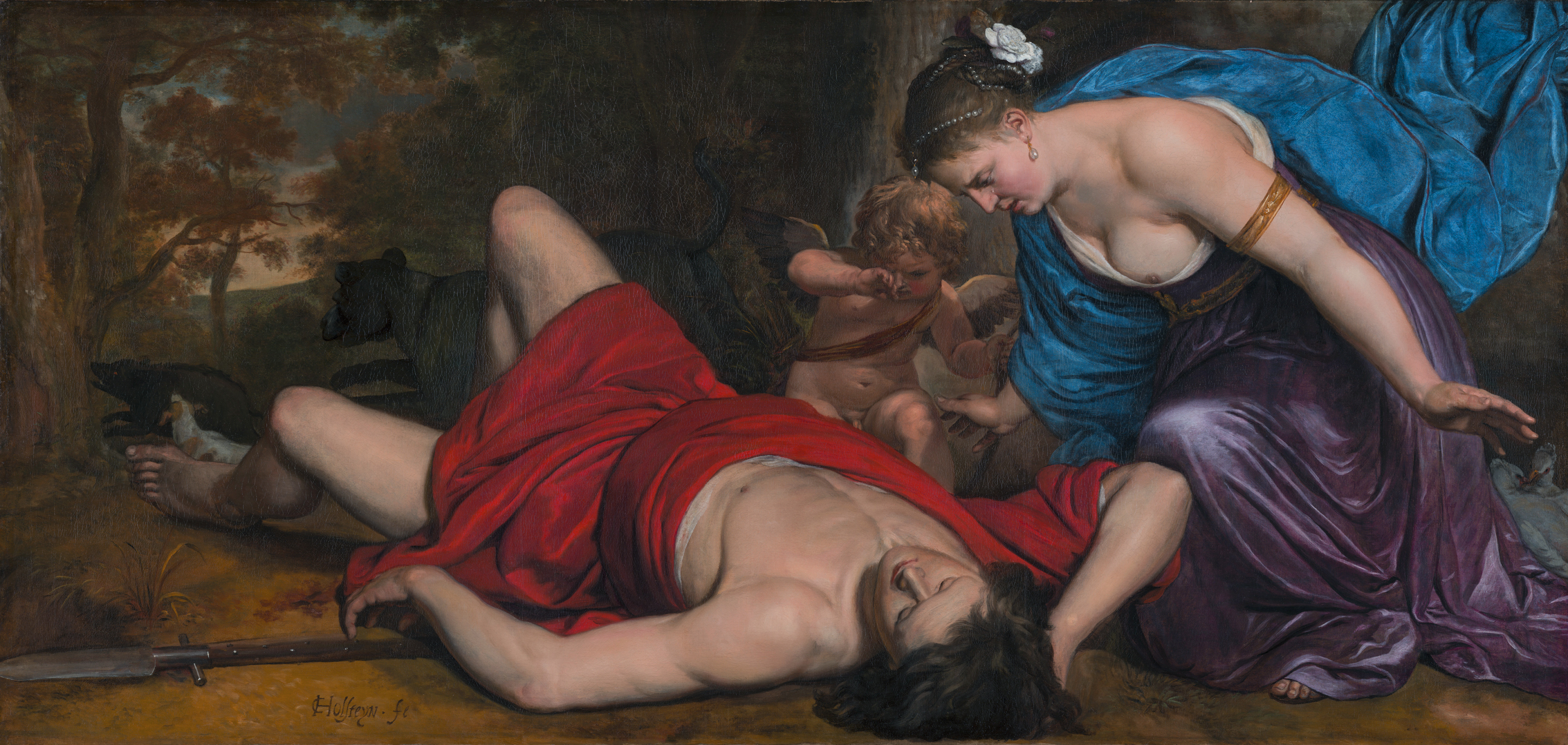
Venus and Cupid Lamenting the Dead Adonis (1656) by Cornelis Holsteyn

Jacques-Louis David's final work was his 1824 magnum opus, Mars Being Disarmed by Venus, which combines elements of classical, Renaissance, traditional French art, and contemporary artistic styles. While he was working on the painting, David described it, saying, "This is the last picture I want to paint, but I want to surpass myself in it. I will put the date of my seventy-five years on it and afterwards I will never again pick up my brush." The painting was exhibited first in Brussels and then in Paris, where over 10,000 people came to see it. Jean-Auguste-Dominique Ingres's painting Venus Anadyomene was one of his major works. Louis Geofroy described it as a "dream of youth realized with the power of maturity, a happiness that few obtain, artists or others." Théophile Gautier declared: "Nothing remains of the marvelous painting of the Greeks, but surely if anything could give the idea of antique painting as it was conceived following the statues of Phidias and the poems of Homer, it is M. Ingres's painting: the Venus Anadyomene of Apelles has been found." Other critics dismissed it as a piece of unimaginative, sentimental kitsch, but Ingres himself considered it to be among his greatest works and used the same figure as the model for his later 1856 painting La Source.

Paintings of Venus were favorites of the late nineteenth-century Academic artists in France. In 1863, Alexandre Cabanel won widespread critical acclaim at the Paris Salon for his painting The Birth of Venus, which the French emperor Napoleon III immediately purchased for his own personal art collection. Édouard Manet's 1865 painting Olympia parodied the nude Venuses of the Academic painters, particularly Cabanel's Birth of Venus. In 1867, the English Academic painter Frederic Leighton displayed his Venus Disrobing for the Bath at the academy. The art critic J. B. Atkinson praised it, declaring that "Mr Leighton, instead of adopting corrupt Roman notions regarding Venus such as Rubens embodied, has wisely reverted to the Greek idea of Aphrodite, a goddess worshipped, and by artists painted, as the perfection of female grace and beauty". A year later, the English painter Dante Gabriel Rossetti, a founding member of the Pre-Raphaelite Brotherhood, painted Venus Verticordia (Latin for "Aphrodite, the Changer of Hearts"), showing Aphrodite as a nude red-headed woman in a garden of roses. Though he was reproached for his outré subject matter, Rossetti refused to alter the painting and it was soon purchased by J. Mitchell of Bradford. In 1879, William Adolphe Bouguereau exhibited at the Paris Salon his own Birth of Venus, which imitated the classical tradition of contrapposto and was met with widespread critical acclaim, rivalling the popularity of Cabanel's version from nearly two decades prior.

18th to 20th centuries

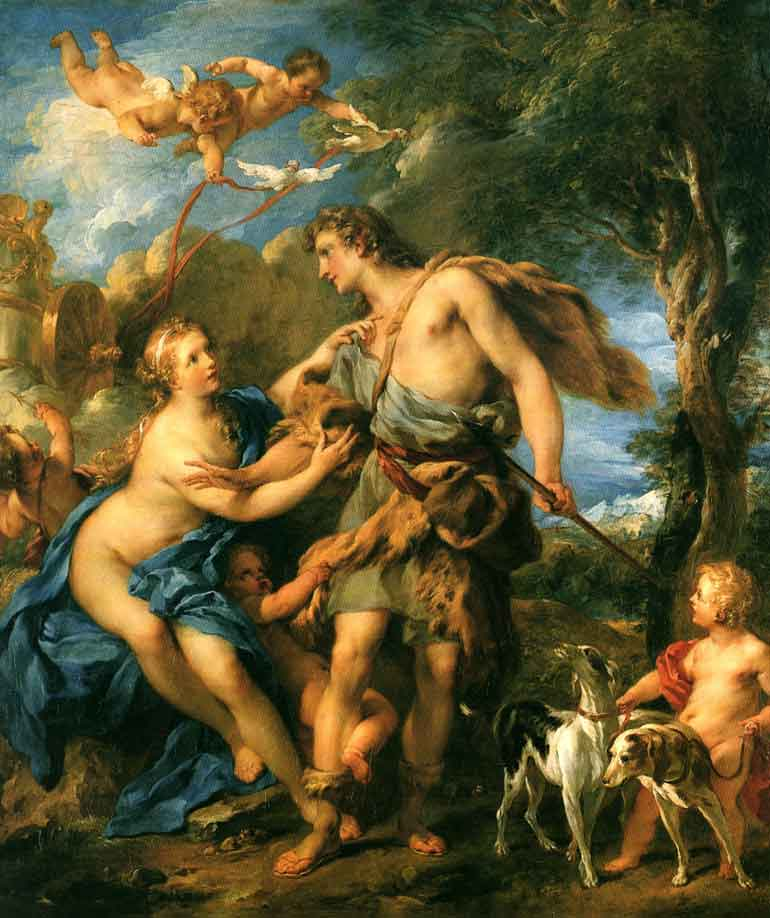
Venus and Adonis (1729) by François Lemoyne

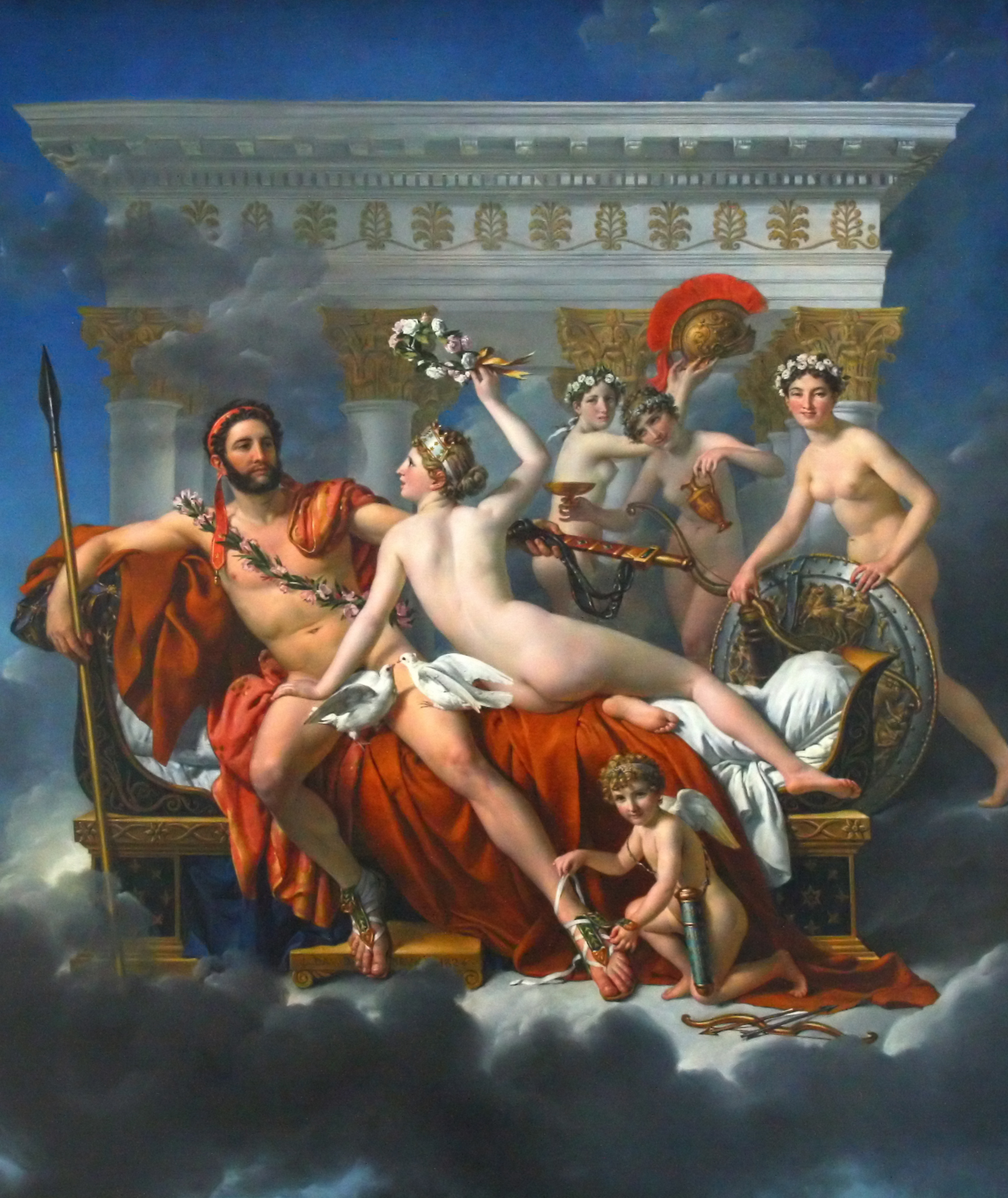
Mars Being Disarmed by Venus (1824) by Jacques-Louis David

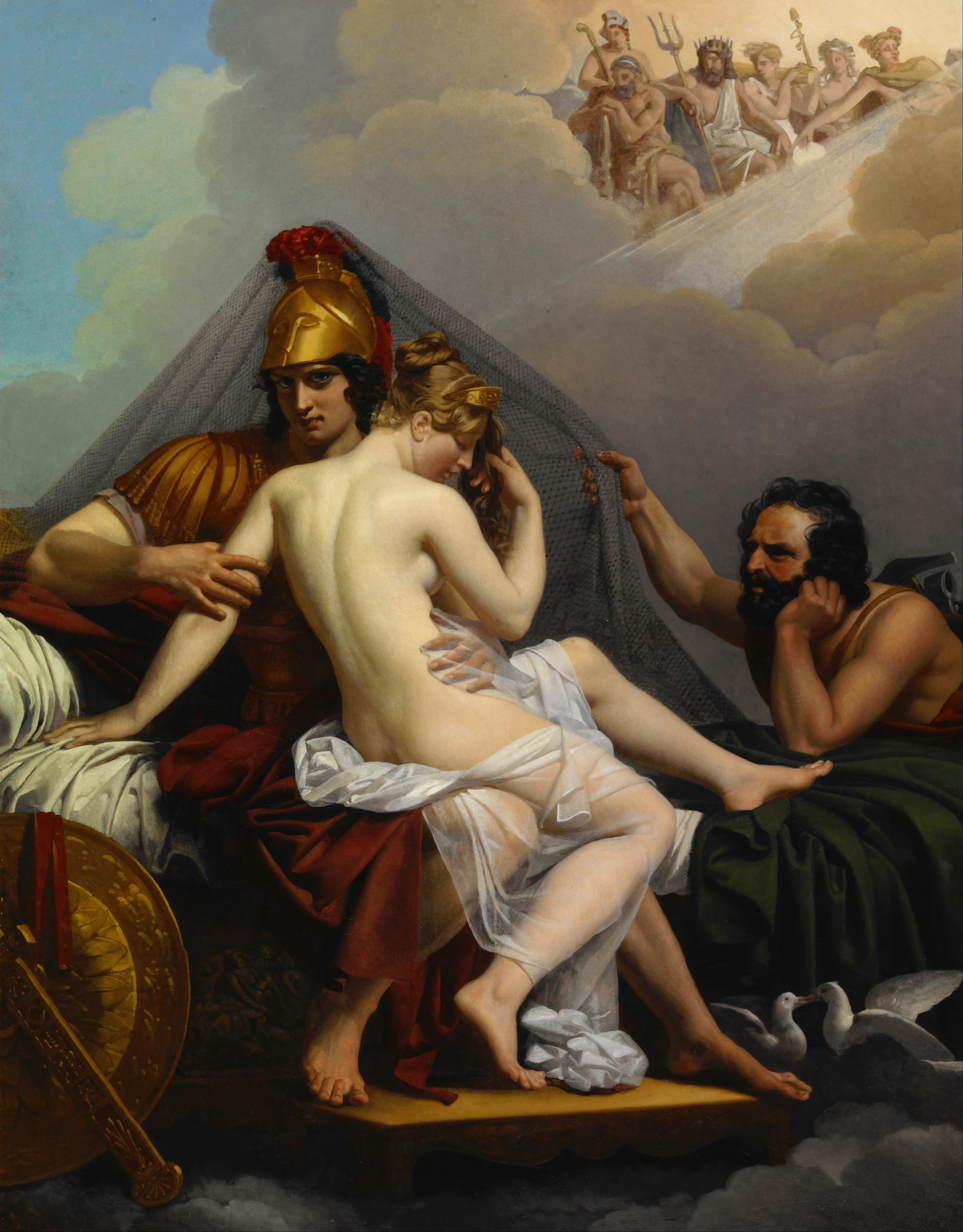
Mars and Venus Surprised by Vulcan (1827) by Alexandre Charles Guillemot

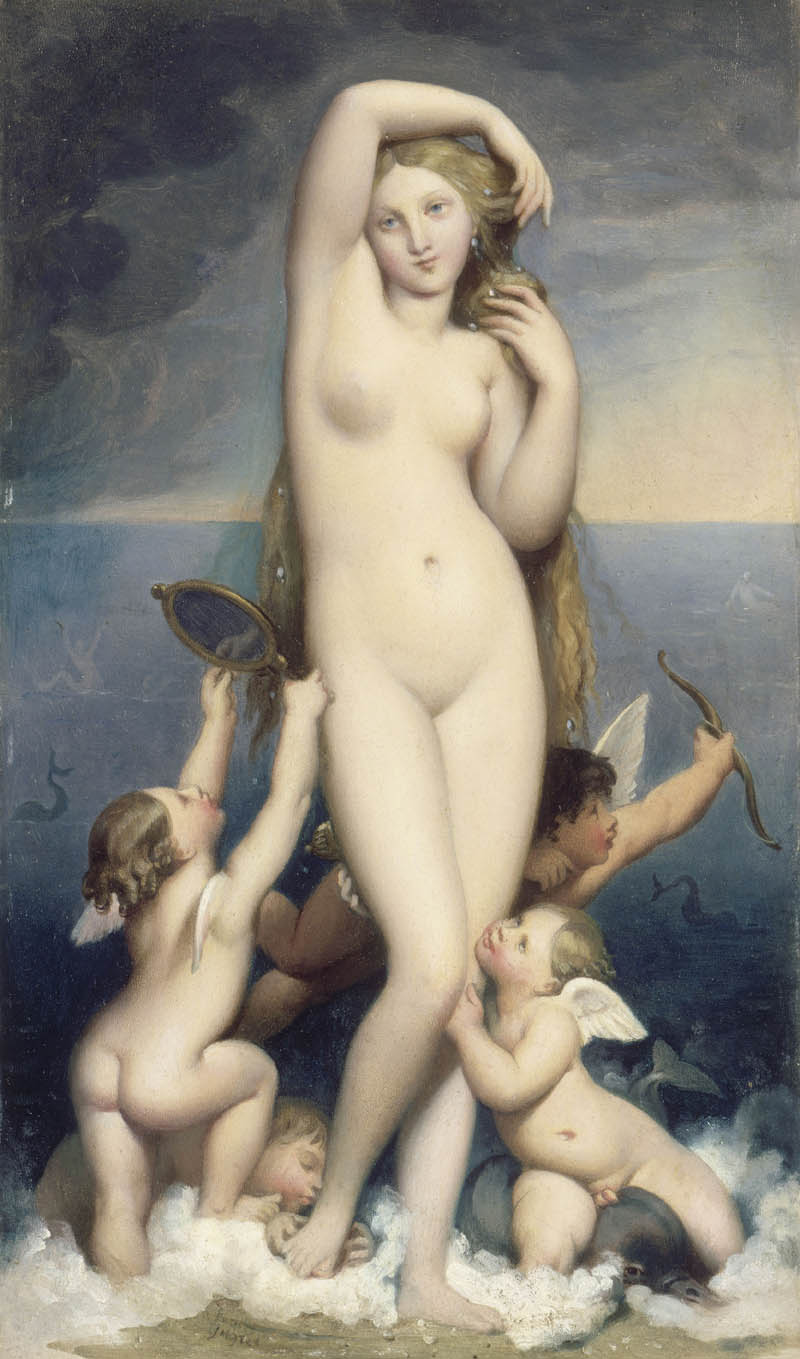
Venus Anadyomene (1848) by Jean-Auguste-Dominique Ingres

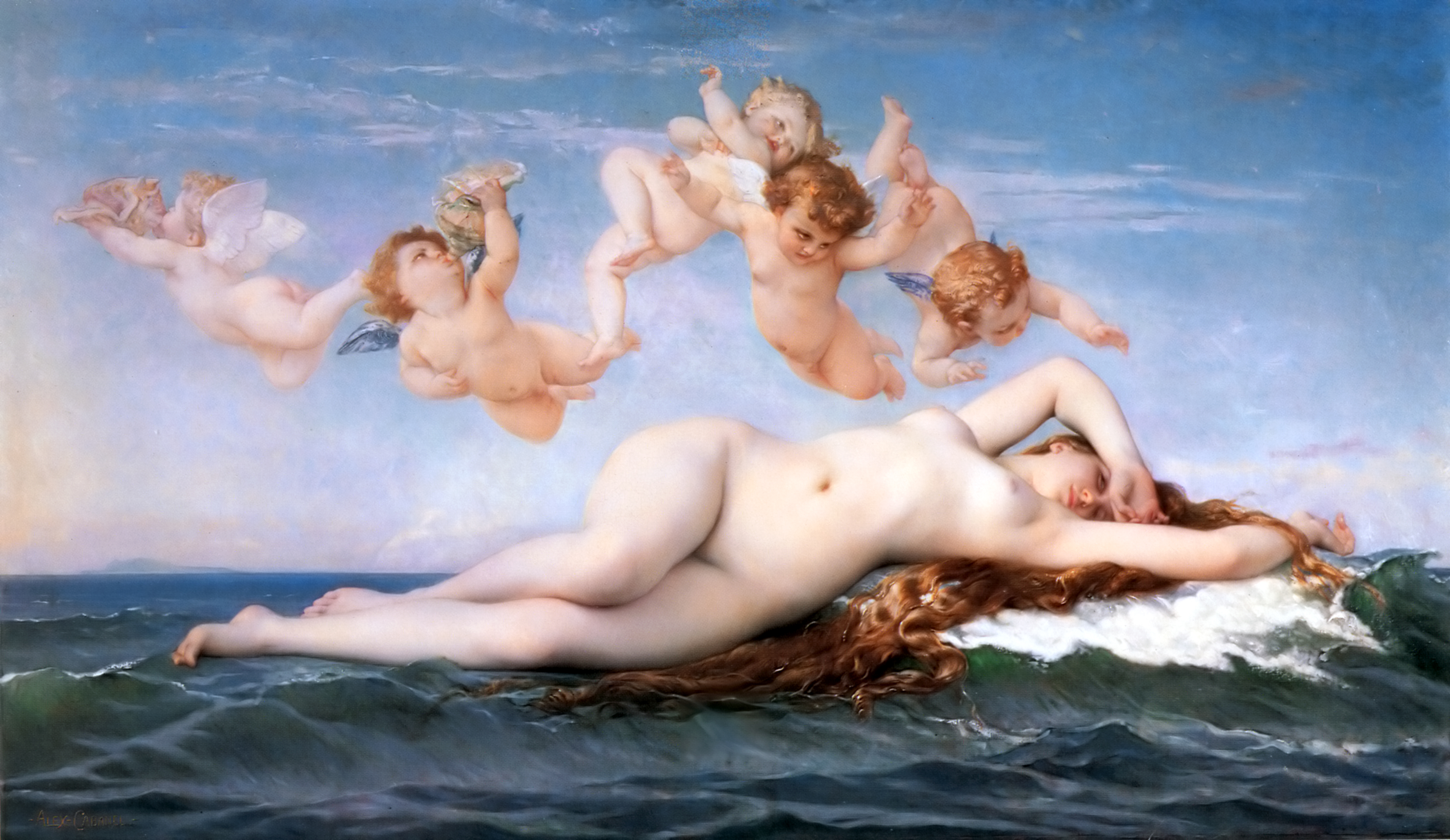
The Birth of Venus (c. 1863) by Alexandre Cabanel

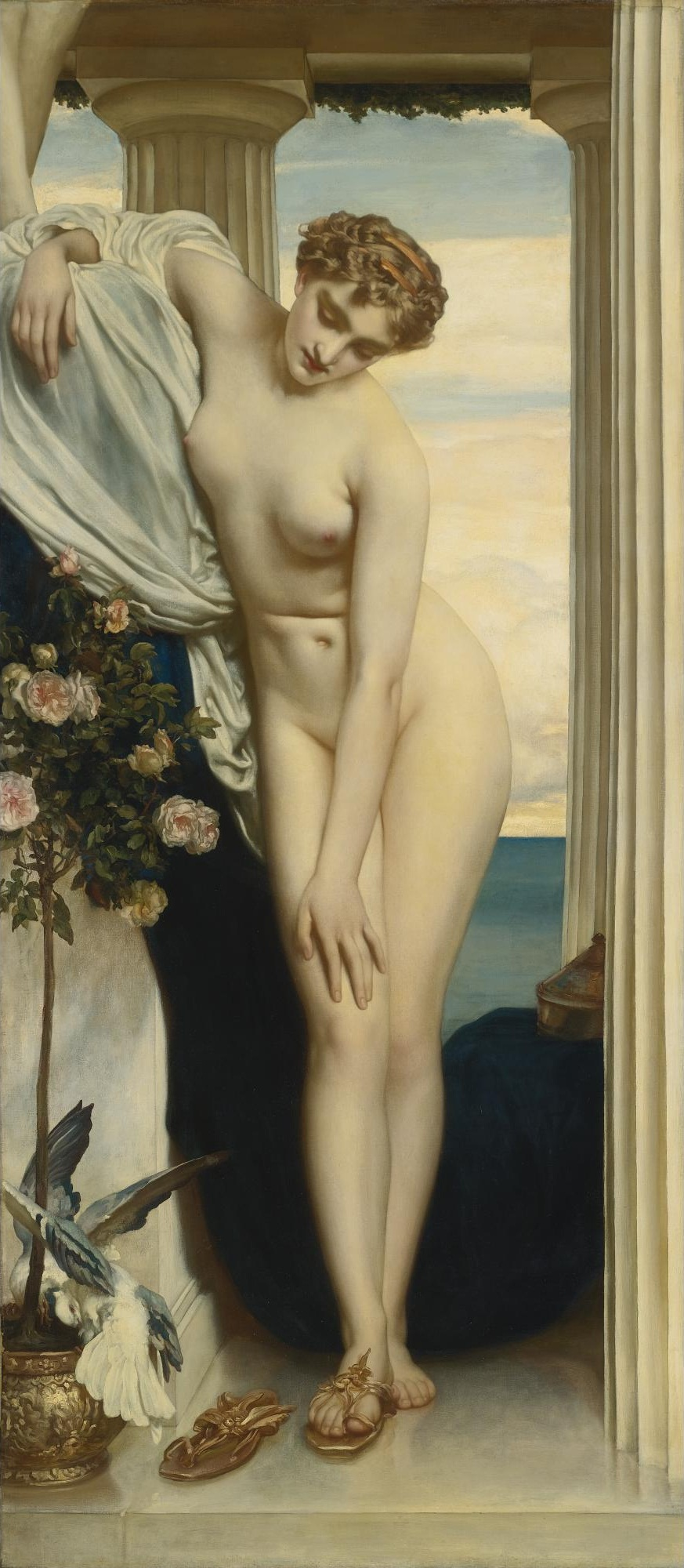
Venus Disrobing for the Bath (1867) by Frederic Leighton

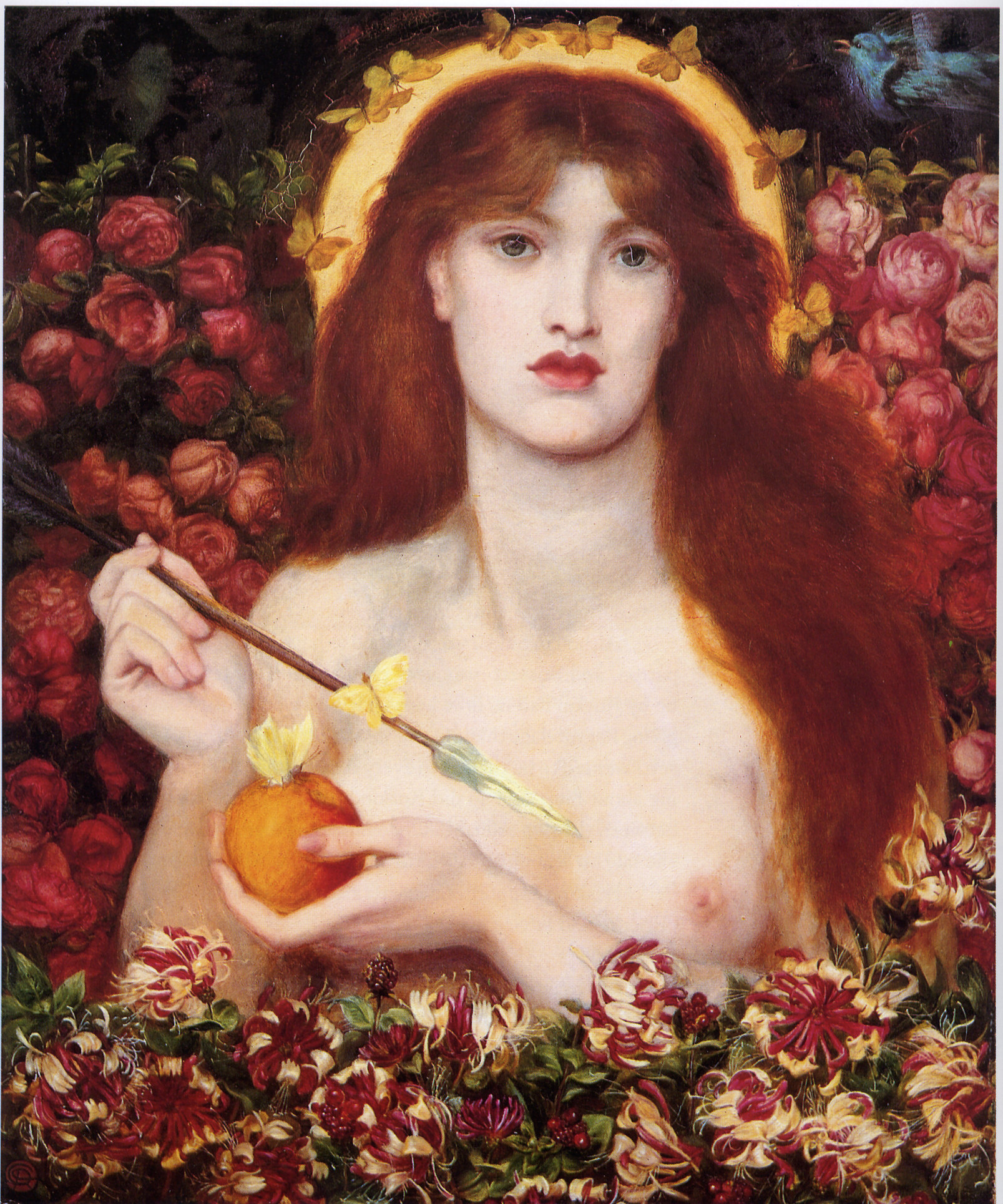
Venus Verticordia (1868) by Dante Gabriel Rossetti

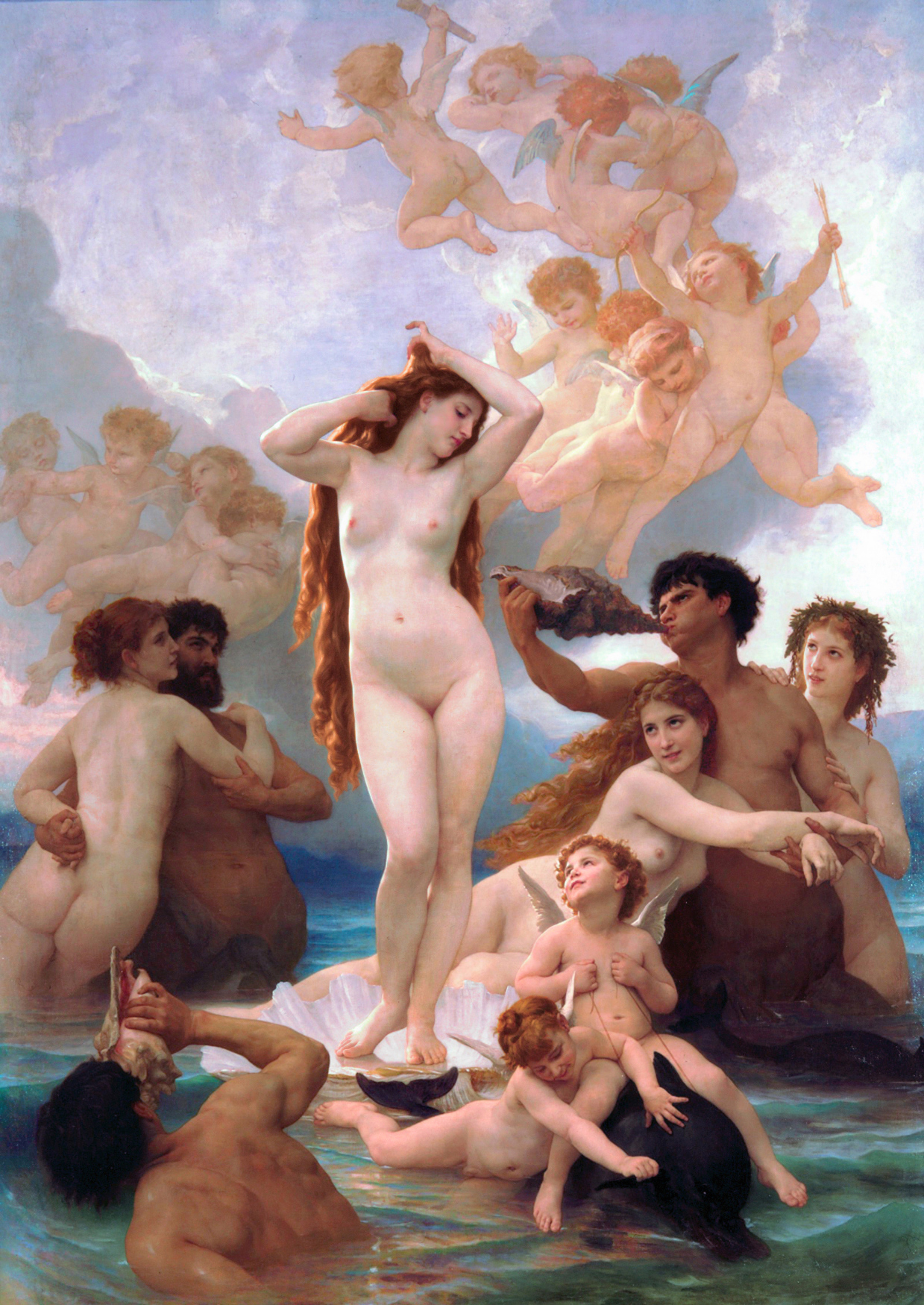
The Birth of Venus (c. 1879) by William-Adolphe Bouguereau

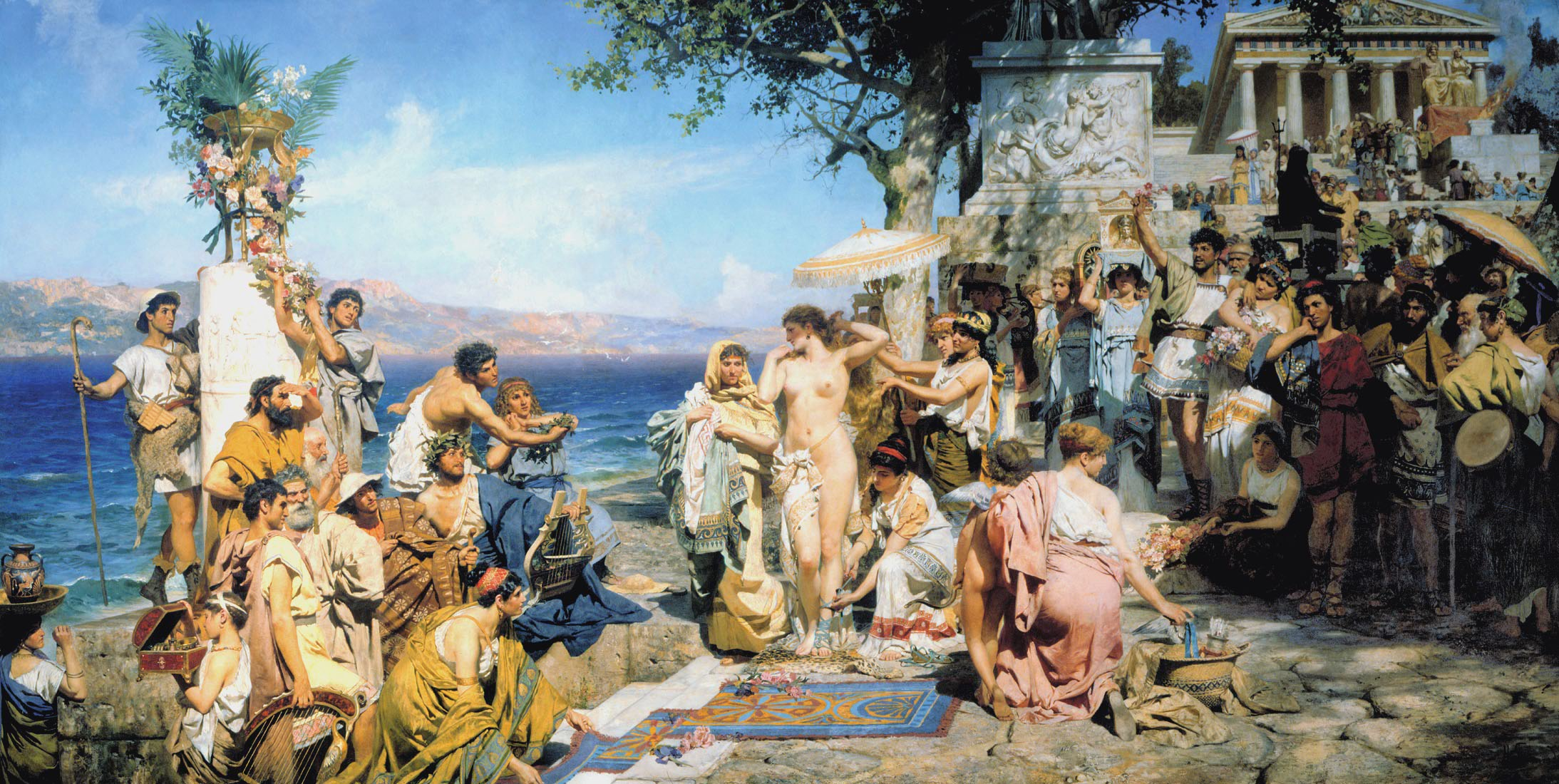
Phryne at the Poseidonia in Eleusis (c. 1889) by Henryk Siemiradzki. (Note: The painting shows the scene of the courtesan Phryne stripping naked at Eleusis. The tale allegedly inspired both Apelles's painting and the Aphrodite of Knidos by Praxiteles.)

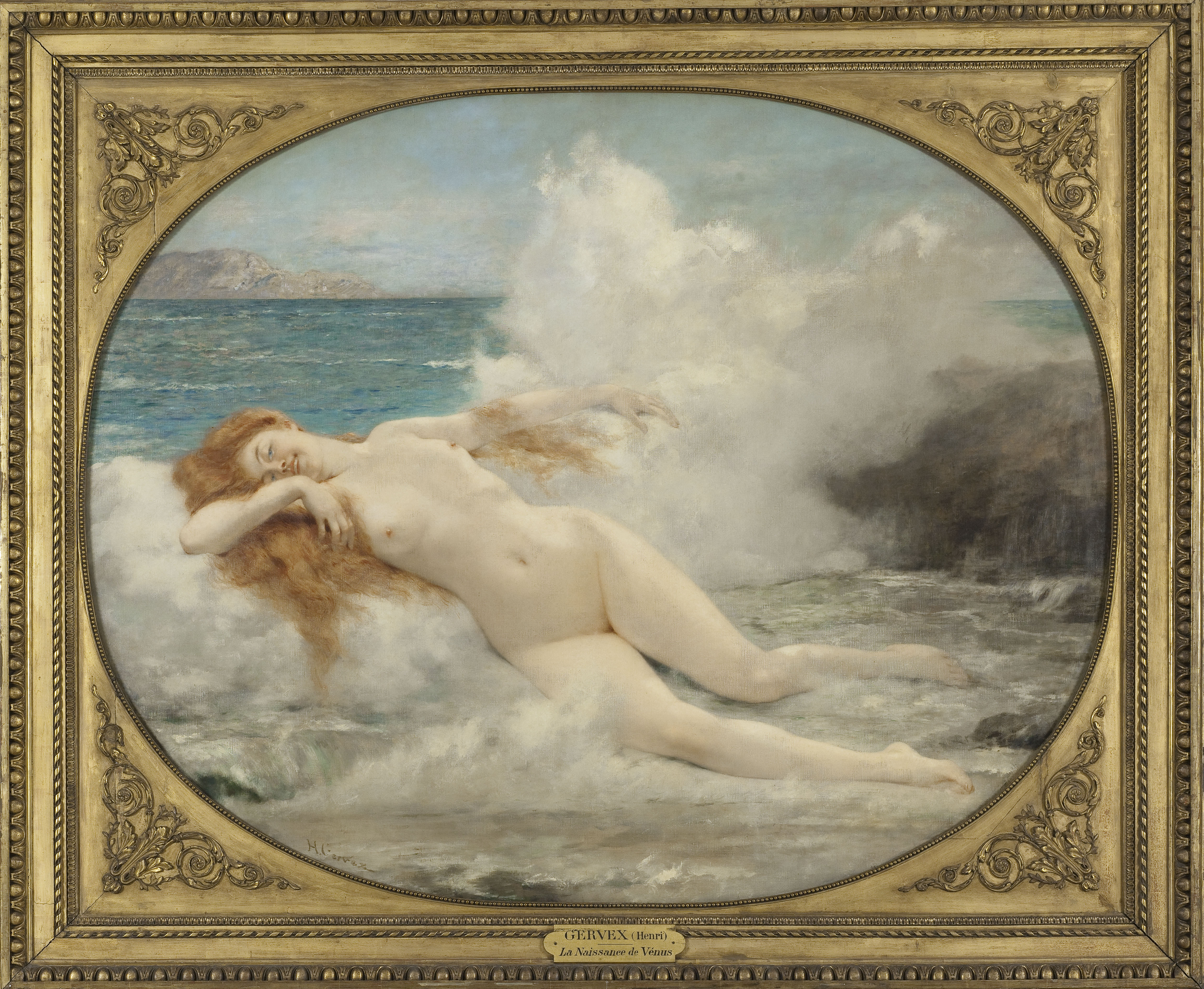
The Birth of Venus (1907) by Henri Gervex

=== Modern culture ===
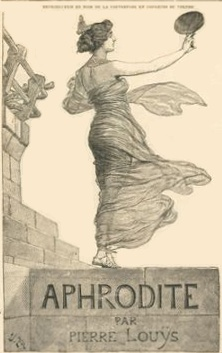
Illustration by Édouard Zier for Pierre Louÿs's 1896 erotic novel Aphrodite: mœurs antiques

William Shakespeare's erotic narrative poem Venus and Adonis (1593), a retelling of the courtship of Aphrodite and Adonis from Ovid's Metamorphoses, was the most popular of all his works published within his own lifetime. Six editions of it were published before Shakespeare's death (more than any of his other works) and it enjoyed particularly strong popularity among young adults. In 1605, Richard Barnfield lauded it, declaring that the poem had placed Shakespeare's name "in fames immortall Booke". Despite this, the poem has received mixed reception from modern critics; Samuel Taylor Coleridge defended it, but Samuel Butler complained that it bored him and C. S. Lewis described an attempted reading of it as "suffocating".

Aphrodite appears in Richard Garnett's short story collection The Twilight of the Gods and Other Tales (1888), in which the gods' temples have been destroyed by Christians. Stories revolving around sculptures of Aphrodite were common in the late nineteenth and early twentieth centuries. Examples of such works of literature include the novel The Tinted Venus: A Farcical Romance (1885) by Thomas Anstey Guthrie and the short story The Venus of Ille (1887) by Prosper Mérimée, both of which are about statues of Aphrodite that come to life. Another noteworthy example is Aphrodite in Aulis by the Anglo-Irish writer George Moore, which revolves around an ancient Greek family who moves to Aulis. The French writer Pierre Louÿs titled his erotic historical novel Aphrodite: mœurs antiques (1896) after the Greek goddess. The novel enjoyed widespread commercial success, but scandalized French audiences due to its sensuality and its decadent portrayal of Greek society. In European literature, her name (including as 'Venus') was metonymic for sex.

In the early twentieth century, stories of Aphrodite were used by feminist poets, such as Amy Lowell and Alicia Ostriker. Many of these poems dealt with Aphrodite's legendary birth from the foam of the sea. Other feminist writers, including Claude Cahun, Thit Jensen, and Anaïs Nin made use of the myth of Aphrodite in their writings. Ever since the publication of Isabel Allende's book Aphrodite: A Memoir of the Senses in 1998, the name "Aphrodite" has been used as a title for dozens of books dealing with all topics even superficially connected to her domain. Frequently these books do not even mention Aphrodite, or mention her only briefly, but make use of her name as a selling point.

In cinema, the symbolism of the goddess of love has been central to William A. Seiter's 1948 film One Touch of Venus starring Ava Gardner, and to Woody Allen's 1995 film Mighty Aphrodite.

In 1938, Gleb Botkin, a Russian immigrant to the United States, founded the Church of Aphrodite, a neopagan religion that worships a mother goddess, identified by its practitioners as Aphrodite.

== Genealogy ==
Aphrodite's family tree

Gaia
Uranus
Uranus's genitals	Coeus	Phoebe	Cronus	Rhea
Leto	Zeus	Hera	Poseidon	Hades	Demeter	Hestia
Apollo	Artemis	a
b
Ares	Hephaestus
Metis
Athena
Maia
Hermes
Semele
Dionysus
Dione
a	b
APHRODITE

== See also ==
- History of nude art – representation of human body throughout history
- Lakshmi – Major Hindu goddess; goddess of wealth and beauty, rose from the ocean like Aphrodite

== Bibliography ==
=== Primary sources ===
- Apollonius Rhodius, Argonautica translated by Robert Cooper Seaton (1853–1915), R. C. Loeb Classical Library Volume 001, William Heinemann, 1912 Online version at the Topos Text Project
- Apollodorus, Apollodorus, The Library, with an English Translation by Sir James George Frazer, F.B.A., F.R.S. in 2 Volumes, Harvard University Press; William Heinemann, 1921 Online version at the Perseus Digital Library
- Diodorus Siculus, Bibliotheca Historica, Vol. 1-2, Immanel Bekker, Ludwig Dindorf, Friedrich Vogel in aedibus B. G. Teubneri, 1888–1890 Greek text available at the Perseus Digital Library
- Euripides, The Complete Greek Drama, edited by Whitney J. Oates and Eugene O'Neill, Jr. in two volumes, 2, The Phoenissae, translated by E. P. Coleridge, Random House, 1938
- Hesiod, Theogony, in The Homeric Hymns and Homerica with an English Translation by Hugh G. Evelyn-White, Harvard University Press; William Heinemann, 1914 Online version at the Perseus Digital Library
- Homer, The Iliad with an English Translation by A.T. Murray, PhD in two volumes, Harvard University Press; William Heinemann, 1924 Online version at the Perseus Digital Library
- Homer; Evelyn-White, Hugh, The Homeric Hymns and Homerica with an English Translation by Hugh G. Evelyn-White, Homeric Hymns, Harvard University Press; William Heinemann, 1914
- Gaius Julius Hyginus, The Myths of Hyginus, edited and translated by Mary A. Grant, University Press of Kansas, 1960
- Gaius Julius Hyginus, Astronomica from The Myths of Hyginus, translated and edited by Mary Grant, University of Kansas, publications in Humanistic Studies Online version at the Topos Text Project
- Ovid, Metamorphoses, translated by A. D. Melville; introduction and notes by E. J. Kenney, Oxford University Press, 2008, ISBN 978-0-19-953737-2
- Pindar, Odes, Diane Arnson Svarlien, 1990 Online version at the Perseus Digital Library
- Pausanias, Pausanias Description of Greece with an English Translation by W.H.S. Jones, Litt.D., and H.A. Ormerod, M.A., in 4 Volumes, Harvard University Press; William Heinemann, 1918 Online version at the Perseus Digital Library

=== Secondary sources ===
- Ames-Lewis, Francis (2000), The Intellectual Life of the Early Renaissance Artist, Yale University Press, ISBN 0-300-09295-4
- Anderson, Graham (2000), Fairytale in the Ancient World, Routledge, pp. 131–132, ISBN 978-0-415-23702-4
- Black, Jeremy; Green, Anthony (1992), Gods, Demons and Symbols of Ancient Mesopotamia: An Illustrated Dictionary, The British Museum Press, ISBN 0-7141-1705-6
- Boedeker, Deborah (1974), Aphrodite's Entry into Greek Epic, Brill Publishers, pp. 15–16
- Beekes, Robert S. P. (2009), Etymological Dictionary of Greek, vol. 1, Brill Publishers, ISBN 978-90-04-17418-4
- Bordes, Philippe (2005), Jacques-Louis David: Empire to Exile, Yale University Press, ISBN 0-300-10447-2
- Botterweck, G. Johannes; Ringgren, Helmer (1990), Theological Dictionary of the Old Testament, vol. VI, William B. Eerdmans Publishing Company, ISBN 0-8028-2330-0
- Breitenberger, Barbara (2007), Aphrodite and Eros: The Development of Greek Erotic Mythology, Routledge, ISBN 978-0-415-96823-2
- Brooks, Richard A.; Alden, Douglas W. (1980), A Critical Bibliography of French Literature, vol. 6, Syracuse University Press, ISBN 0-8156-2207-4
- Bull, Malcolm (2005), The Mirror of the Gods: How Renaissance Artists Rediscovered the Pagan Gods, Oxford University Press, ISBN 0-19-521923-6
- Bullough, Vern L.; Bullough, Bonnie (1993), Cross Dressing, Sex, and Gender (reprint ed.), University of Pennsylvania Press, p. 29, ISBN 978-0-8122-1431-4
- Budin, Stephanie L. (2010), "Aphrodite Enoplion", in Smith, Amy C.; Pickup, Sadie (eds.), Brill's Companion to Aphrodite, Brill's Companions in Classical Studies, Brill Publishers, pp. 85–86, 96, 100, 102–103, 112, 123, 125, ISBN 978-90-474-4450-3
- Burkert, Walter (1985), Greek Religion, Harvard University Press, ISBN 0-674-36281-0
- Burkert, Walter (1998) [1992], The Orientalizing Revolution: Near Eastern Influence on Greek Culture in the Early Archaic Age, Harvard University Press, ISBN 978-0-674-64364-2
- Burkert, Walter (2005), "Chapter Twenty: Near Eastern Connections", in Foley, John Miles (ed.), A Companion to Ancient Epic, Blackwell Publishing, ISBN 978-1-4051-0524-8
- Cameron, Alan (2004). Greek Mythography in the Roman World. Oxford University Press. ISBN 0-19-517121-7.
- Clark, Nora (2015), Aphrodite and Venus in Myth and Mimesis, Cambridge Scholars Publishing, ISBN 978-1-4438-7127-3
- Cunningham, Lawrence S.; Reich, John Jay (2009), Culture & Values, Volume II: A Survey of the Humanities with Readings, Cengage Group, ISBN 978-0-495-56926-8
- Cyrino, Monica S. (2010), Aphrodite, Gods and Heroes of the Ancient World, Routledge, ISBN 978-0-415-77523-6
- Pirenne-Delforge, Vinciane (2010). "Flourishing Aphrodite: An Overview". In Smith, Amy C.; Pickup, Sadie (eds.). Brill's Companion to Aphrodite. Brill. pp. 3–16. ISBN 978-90-04-18003-1.
- Dumézil, Georges (1934), Ouranos-Varuna: Étude de mythologie comparée indo-européenne, Maisonneuve
- Dunand, Françoise (2007), "The Religious System in Alexandria", in Ogden, Daniel (ed.), A Companion to Greek Religion, Blackwell Publishing, pp. 253–263, ISBN 978-1-4051-2054-8
- Fossi, Gloria (1998), Botticelli - Primavera, Giunti Editore, ISBN 978-88-09-21459-0
- Frisk, Hjalmar (1960), Griechisches etymologisches Wörterbuch, vol. 1, Carl Winter, p. 196f
- Gantz, Timothy (1996), Early Greek Myth: A Guide to Literary and Artistic Sources, Johns Hopkins University Press, ISBN 978-0-8018-5360-9
- Gay, Peter (1998), Pleasure Wars: The Bourgeois Experience: Victoria to Freud, W. W. Norton & Company, ISBN 0-393-31827-3
- Grafton, Anthony; Most, Glenn W.; Settis, Salvatore (2010). The Classical Tradition. Cambridge, Massachusetts: Harvard University Press. ISBN 978-0-674-03572-0. OCLC 318876873.
- Grant, Michael (1989), The Classical Greeks, History of Civilization, Charles Scribner's Sons, ISBN 0-684-19126-1
- Graz, F. (1984), Eck, W. (ed.), "Women, War, and Warlike Divinities", Zeitschrift für Papyrologie und Epigraphik, 55 (55), Dr. Rudolf Habelt GmbH: 250, JSTOR 20184039
- Hansen, William (2004), Handbook of Classical Mythology, ABC-Clio, ISBN 978-1-57607-226-4
- Havelock, Christine Mitchell (2007) [1995], The Aphrodite of Knidos and Her Successors: A Historical Review of the Female Nude in Greek Art, University of Michigan Press, ISBN 978-0-472-03277-8
- Hill, Laban Carrick (2007), A Brush With Napoleon: An Encounter With Jacques-Louis David, Watson-Guptill, ISBN 978-0-8230-0417-1
- Hiscock, Andrew (2017), ""Suppose thou dost defend me from what is past": Shakespeare's Venus and Adonis and The Rape of Lucrece and the appetite for ancient memory", in Wilder, Lina Perkins (ed.), The Routledge Handbook of Shakespeare and Memory, Routledge, ISBN 978-1-315-74594-7
- Iossif, Panagiotis; Lorber, Catharine (2007), "Laodikai and the Goddess Nikephoros" (PDF), L'Antiquité Classique, 76: 77, doi:10.3406/antiq.2007.2618, hdl:2066/205290, ISSN 0770-2817, JSTOR 41665635
- Janda, Michael (2005), Elysion - Entstehung und Entwicklung der griechischen Religion, Institut für Sprachen und Literaturen, ISBN 978-3-85124-702-2
- Janda, Michael (2010), Die Musik nach dem Chaos: der Schöpfungsmythos der europäischen Vorzeit, Institut für Sprachen und Literaturen, ISBN 978-3-85124-227-0
- Konaris, Michael D. (2016), The Greek Gods in Modern Scholarship: Interpretation and Belief in Nineteenth Century and Early Twentieth Century Germany and Britain, Oxford University Press, ISBN 978-0-19-873789-6
- Kerényi, Karl (1951), The Gods of the Greeks, Thames & Hudson
- Koloski-Ostrow, Ann Olga; Lyons, Claire L. (2000), Naked Truths: Women, Sexuality, and Gender in Classical Art and Archaeology, Routledge, pp. 230–231, ISBN 0-415-21752-0
- Lákta, Peter (2017), ""All Adonises Must Die": Shakespeare's Venus and Adonis and the episodic imaginary", in Marrapodi, Michele (ed.), Shakespeare and the Visual Arts: The Italian Influence, Routledge, ISBN 978-1-315-21225-8
- Lewis, Sian; Llewellyn-Jones, Lloyd (2018), The Culture of Animals in Antiquity: A Sourcebook with Commentaries, Routledge, ISBN 978-1-315-20160-3
- Link, Luther (1995), The Devil: A Mask Without a Face, Reaktion Books, ISBN 0-948462-67-1
- Marcovich, Miroslav (1996), "From Ishtar to Aphrodite", Journal of Aesthetic Education, 39 (2): 43–59, doi:10.2307/3333191, JSTOR 3333191
- McKinley, Kathryn L. (2001), Reading the Ovidian Heroine: "Metamorphoses" Commentaries 1100–1618, Brill Publishers, ISBN 90-04-11796-2
- McPhee, Peter (1986), Proceedings of the Fifth George Rudé Seminar in French History, Victoria University of Wellington
- Nilsson, Martin P. (1941), Geschichte der griechischen Religion (in German), vol. 1: Bis zur griechischen Weltherrschaft, Munich: Beck
- Palagia, Olga; Pollitt, J. J. (1996), Personal Styles in Greek Sculpture, Cambridge University Press, ISBN 0-521-65738-5
- Penglase, Charles (1994), Greek Myths and Mesopotamia: Parallels and Influence in the Homeric Hymns and Hesiod, Routledge, ISBN 0-415-15706-4
- Pizza, Murphy; Lewis, James R. (2009), Handbook of Contemporary Paganism, Brill Publishers, ISBN 978-90-04-16373-7
- Powell, Barry B. (2012) [2004], "Myths of Aphrodite, Artemis, Athena", Classical Myth (Seventh ed.), Pearson, pp. 211–235, ISBN 978-0-205-17607-6
- Puhvel, Jaan (1987), Comparative Mythology, Johns Hopkins University Press, ISBN 0-8018-3938-6
- Rosenzweig, Rachel (2004), Worshipping Aphrodite: Art and Cult in Classical Athens, University of Michigan Press, ISBN 0-472-11332-1
- Ruck, Carl; Staples, Blaise Daniel (2001), The Apples of Apollo: Pagan and Christian Mysteries of the Eucharist, Carolina Academic Press, pp. 64–70, ISBN 0-89089-924-X
- Simon, Erika (1983), Festivals of Attica: An Archaeological Companion, University of Wisconsin Press, ISBN 0-299-09184-8
- Slater, Philip Elliot (1968), The Glory of Hera: Greek Mythology and the Greek Family, Princeton University Press, ISBN 0-691-00222-3
- Smith, Alison (1996), The Victorian Nude: Sexuality, Morality, and Art, Manchester University Press, ISBN 0-7190-4403-0
- Smith, William (1873), Dictionary of Greek and Roman Biography and Mythology, John Murray
- Taylor, Joan E. (1993), Christians and the Holy Places: The Myth of Jewish-Christian Origins, Oxford University Press, ISBN 0-19-814785-6
- Tinagli, Paola (1997), Women in Italian Renaissance Art: Gender, Representation and Identity, Manchester University Press, ISBN 0-7190-4054-X
- Tinkle, Theresa (1996), Medieval Venuses and Cupids: Sexuality, Hermeneutics, and English Poetry, Stanford University Press, ISBN 978-0-8047-2515-6
- Tinterow, Gary (1999), "Paris, 1841–1867", Portraits by Ingres: Image of an Epoch, Metropolitan Museum of Art, ISBN 0-87099-891-9
- Walcot, P. (April 1977), "The Judgement of Paris", Greece & Rome, 24 (1), Cambridge University Press: 31–39, doi:10.1017/S0017383500019616, JSTOR 642687, S2CID 162573370
- Wasson, R. Gordon (1968), Soma: Divine Mushroom of Immortality, Harcourt Brace Jovanovich, p. 128, ISBN 0-15-683800-1
- West, Martin Litchfield (1997), The East Face of Helicon: West Asiatic Elements in Greek Poetry and Myth, Clarendon Press, p. 57, ISBN 0-19-815221-3
- West, Martin L. (June 2011), "The First Homeric Hymn to Dionysus", in Faulkner, Andrew (ed.), The Homeric Hymns: Interpretative Essays, Oxford Academic, pp. 29–43, doi:10.1093/acprof:oso/9780199589036.003.0002, ISBN 978-0-19-958903-6
- West, Martin Litchfield (2000), "The Name of Aphrodite", Glotta, 76 (1./2. H), Vandenhoeck & Ruprecht: 134–138, JSTOR 40267103
- Witczak, Krzysztof Tomasz (1993), Lambert Isebaert (ed.), "Greek Aphrodite and her Indo-European origins", Miscellanea Linguistica Graeco-Latina, Société des études classiques: 115–123
- Witt, Reginald Eldred (1997), Isis in the Ancient World, Johns Hopkins University Press, ISBN 0-8018-5642-6
