= Venus Frigida =

Painting by Peter Paul Rubens

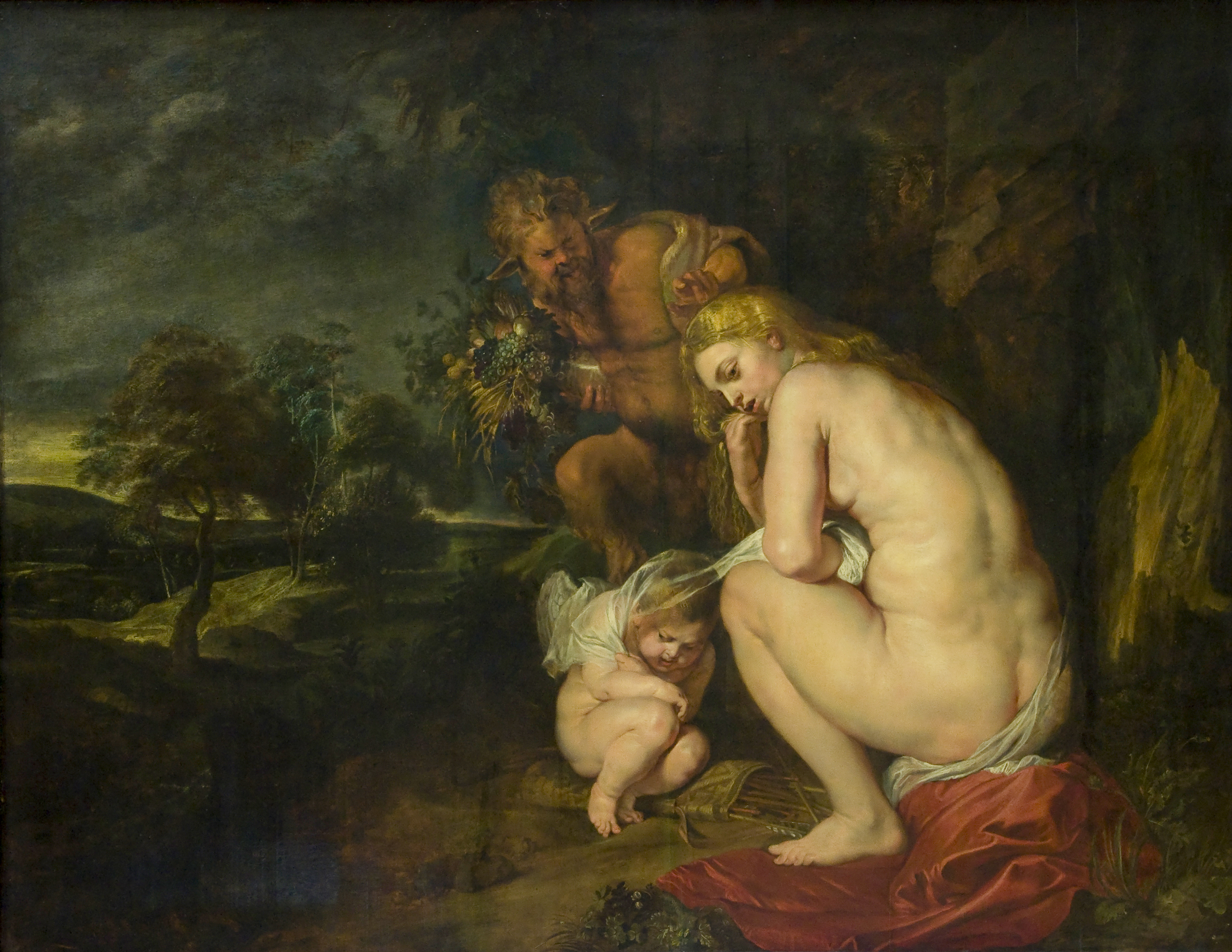
- Artist: Peter Paul Rubens
- Year: 1614
- Movement: Baroque
- Location: Royal Museum of Fine Arts, Antwerp

Venus Frigida (Cold Venus) is a 1614 oil on panel painting by Peter Paul Rubens, now in the Royal Museum of Fine Arts Antwerp. It is one of the few works which he both signed and dated and derives its title from a quotation from the Roman playwright Terence, "sine Cerere et Baccho friget Venus" ("without Ceres and Bacchus, Venus freezes") i.e. love cannot survive without food and wine). He draws Venus' crouched pose from what would later be called the Lely Venus, which he saw in the Gonzaga collection during his time in Mantua.

Cupid and his arrows are shown in front of Venus.

== Sources ==
- https://kmska.be/en/masterpiece/venus-frigida
- http://www.kmska.be/nl/collectie/highlights/Venus_Frigida.html
