= Arrotino =

Hellenistic-Roman sculpture

The Arrotino
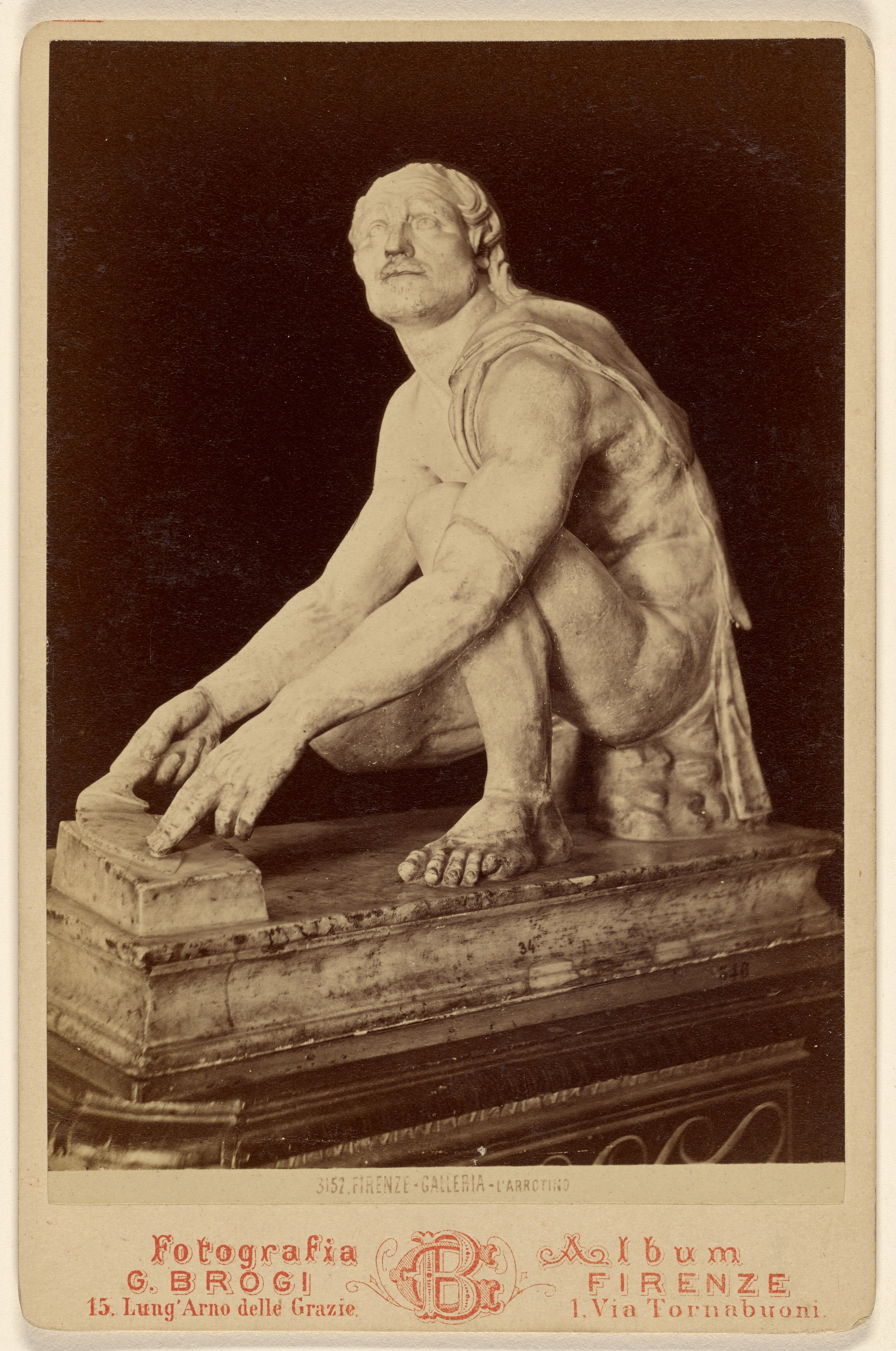
- Artist: Anon.
- Year: 1st century BC, after Hellenistic original
- Type: White marble
- Location: Uffizi, Florence

The Arrotino (Italian - the "Blade-Sharpener"), or formerly the Scythian, thought to be a figure from a group representing the Flaying of Marsyas is a Hellenistic-Roman sculpture (Pergamene school) of a man crouching to sharpen a knife on a whetstone.

== Discovery and ownership ==
The sculpture was likely excavated in the early sixteenth century, since it is recognizable in an inventory made after the death of Agostino Chigi in 1520 of his villa in Trastevere, which would become the Villa Farnesina. Later the sculpture formed part of the garden of sculptures and antiquities that Paolantonio Soderini inherited from his brother, Monsignor Francesco Soderini, who had arranged them in the Mausoleum of Augustus; Paolantonio noted in a letter of 1561 that il mio villano— "my peasant"— had gone away, and it is known that a member of the Mignanelli family sold the Arrotino to Cardinal Ferdinando de' Medici. It was removed to the Villa Medici, where it was displayed until it was removed in the eighteenth century to the Medici collections in Florence.

== Interpretation ==
In the Medici collections the villano was reinterpreted as a Scythian, or divorced of its genre associations entirely by becoming a royal barber or butler overhearing treasonous plotting against the state, raising it to the level of moralised history, which ranked higher in the contemporary hierarchy of genres. Only since the seventeenth century has it been recognized as having formed one part of a Hellenistic group of "Apollo flaying Marsyas" (akin to the better-known multiple figures of Laocoön and His Sons, the Odyssean groups at Sperlonga, or the Pergamene group of which the Dying Gaul was once a part). The identification with a Marsyas group was introduced in 1669, in a publication by Leonardo Agostini, who recognized the theme in antique engraved hardstones.

The Arrotino was also for a long time thought to be an original Greek sculpture, and one of the finest such sculptures to have survived. As such, plaster copies were made for show and for art instruction (one made for the Royal Academy is now on view at the Courtauld). The original was often displayed beside one of the variants of the other great ancient sculpture of a crouching figure, the Crouching Venus also in the Uffizi collection. However, the Arrotino is now recognised simply as a first-century BC copy from a Hellenistic original.

It is on display in the Tribuna of the Uffizi, alongside Old Master paintings, as it has been since the 18th century.

Detail from the Tribuna of the Uffizi by Johann Zoffany:The Arrotino is staged as if in the Tribuna in the 1770s, with the Chimera of Arezzo behind it; such an imaginary assembly of antiquities was a feature of the painting genre called a capriccio.

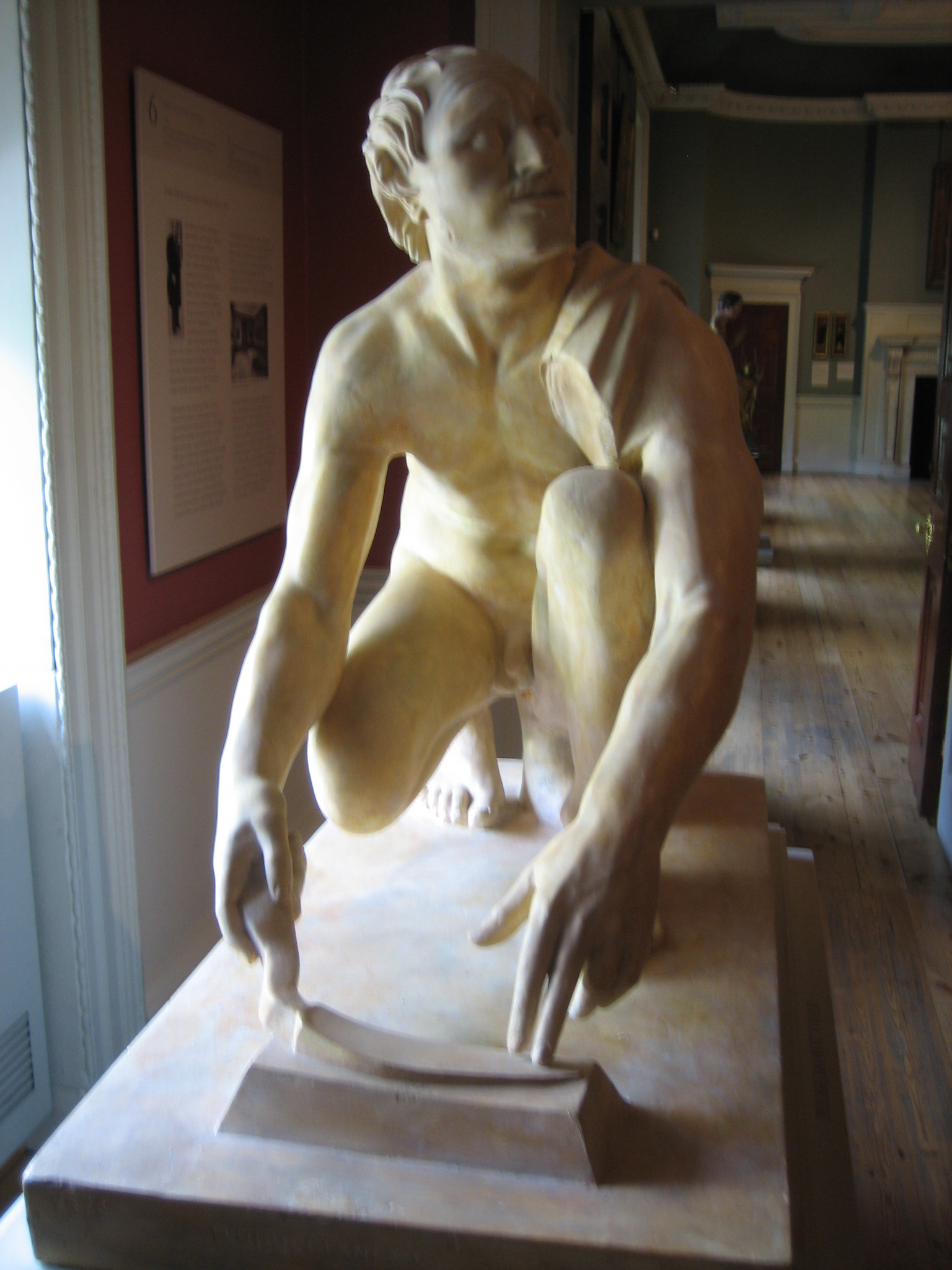
The Royal Academy cast (Courtauld Gallery), London
