= Lely Venus =

Roman marble statue of the goddess Venus

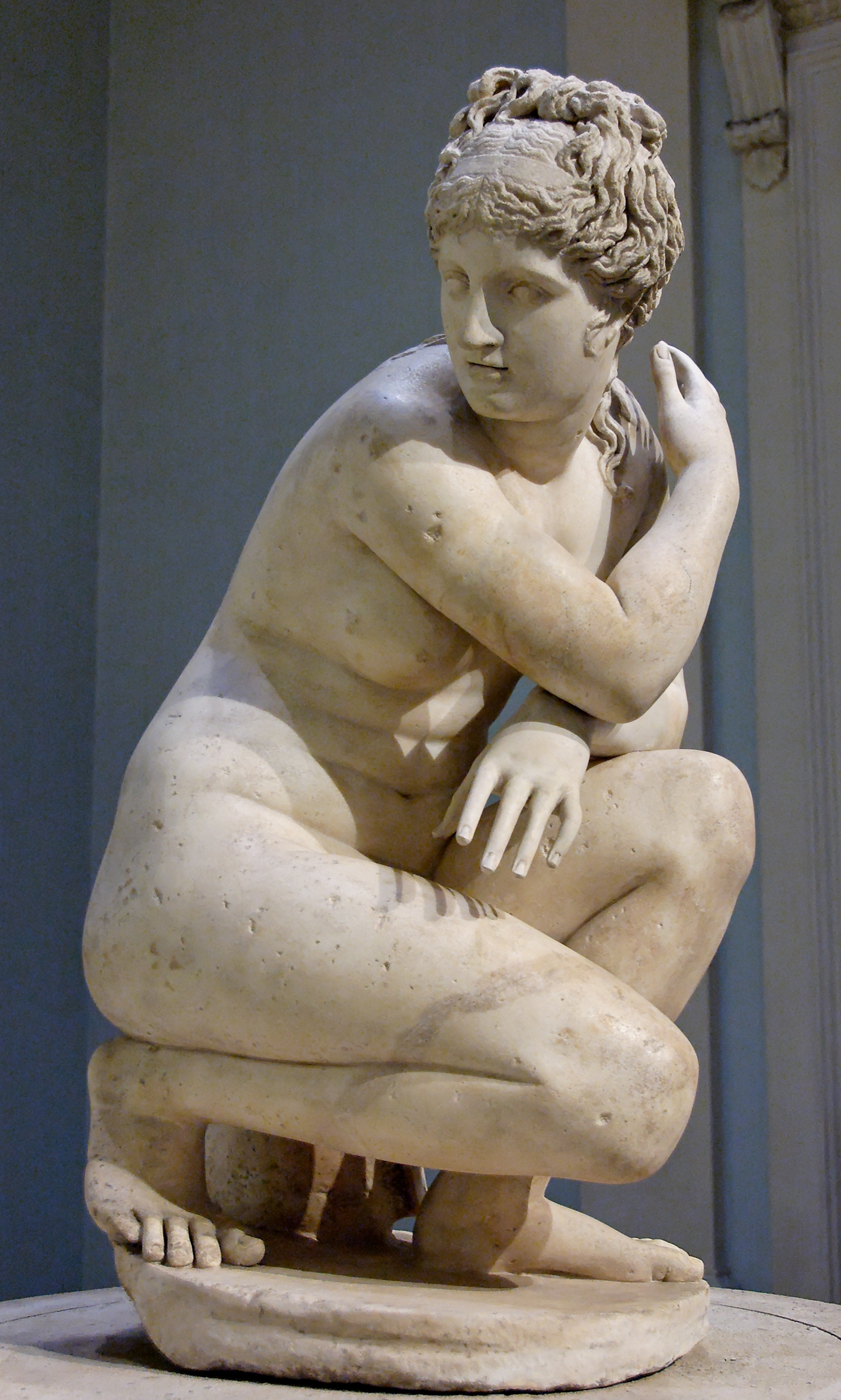
- The Lely Venus displayed in the British Museum, photographed in 2011
- Completion date: 2nd century CE
- Subject: The Graeco-Roman goddess Venus (in Latin) or Aphrodite (in Greek)
- Dimensions: c. 112 cm (44 in) in height, 43 cm (17 in) in width, and 58 cm (23 in) in depth
- Location: British Museum, London
- Owner: Royal Collection
- Accession: GR 1963.10-29.1 (British Museum); RCIN 69746 (Royal Collection)

The Lely Venus (Note: Also known as Naked Aphrodite Crouching at Her Bath, and as the Windsor Venus.) is a Roman marble statue of the goddess Venus. It was sculpted in the second century CE, probably as a version of a Greek statue from the Hellenistic period (323–30 BCE). It is an example of the Crouching Venus type, which developed from the Knidian Aphrodite type sculpted by the Athenian Praxiteles around 350 BCE, and is characterised as a more sensual and sexualised development of earlier poses in which Venus, or her Greek counterpart Aphrodite, had been depicted.

The sculpture is approximately 112 centimetres (44 in) in height, and set on an ovoid base. It has remained mostly intact since antiquity, apart from restorations to the lower parts of both arms. From some time after 1502, it was owned by the Gonzaga ruling family of the Italian city of Mantua. It has been credited as an influence on several Renaissance and early modern artists active in Italy, including Raphael, Marcantonio Raimondi, and the Flemish Peter Paul Rubens, who painted several figures, including Venus herself, in the pose of the statue.

In 1629, the statue was sold to Charles I of England, along with several other artworks and antiquities from the Gonzaga collection. After Charles's execution in 1649, it was sold to Robert Houghton, formerly the king's brewer, to pay debts owed to him by the Crown, and it came into the possession of the painter Peter Lely. It was returned to the Royal Collection in 1682, after Lely's death, and displayed in the Palace of Whitehall. It was saved from the fire that destroyed most of the palace in 1698, but stolen afterwards; it returned to royal possession in 1702. The statue was moved to Windsor Castle in 1902, and lost at some point afterwards. Following its rediscovery in the 1950s, it was placed on permanent loan to the British Museum in 1963. It has since featured in exhibitions at the British Museum, at the National Gallery, and at the Ashmolean Museum at the University of Oxford.

== The Crouching Venus type ==
The Lely Venus is an example of the "Crouching Venus" or "Crouching Aphrodite" type. The Crouching Venus was a style of statue of the Graeco-Roman goddess Venus (equivalent to the Greek Aphrodite) depicting her in a crouched position, often in the act of bathing. Images of nude female figures, including goddesses, are known in this position from the sixth century BCE, though life-size versions of Aphrodite in this position are known only from the Hellenistic period (323–30 BCE) and onwards. Art historians mostly date the origin of the Crouching Aphrodite to the third century BCE, though Andreas Linfert dates it to the middle of the second century BCE. (Note: Havelock 1995, p. 82, citing Linfert 1969, pp. 160–161.) The art historian Geoffrey Waywell calls the Lely Venus "arguably the finest version of this much copied statue type".

The Crouching Aphrodite was a development of the Knidian Aphrodite type, or Venus Pudica ("Venus Ashamed"), first sculpted by the Athenian Praxiteles around 350 BCE. It bears similarities to the standing Capitoline Aphrodite type, a descendant of the Knidian type known from Roman versions of Hellenistic sculptures, and may have been a development of it. In the early twentieth century, the art historian Gerhard Krahmer argued that the archetype of the form was a sculpture made by a sculptor named Diodalsas for Nicomedes I of Bithynia (d. c. 247 BCE); modern scholars reject this view.

The Crouching Venus form was widely adapted and imitated by sculptors of the Italian Renaissance, including Pier Jacopo Alari Bonacolsi ("L'Antico), Andrea Riccio and Giambologna. It was also used, particularly in the first half of the sixteenth century, as inspiration for paintings, prints and drawings, though this trend declined after 1550 and, in the words of the art historian Selma Hoyo, "an esoteric and empty cliché" by the last third of the century. It remained a highly visible fixture of European art into the nineteenth century.

The art historian Christine Havelock suggests that it made "a more outspoken statement about the ripened female body" than standing types, via "the heavy weight of the pear-shaped body, the pendulous breasts, and the ample rolls of flesh around the abdomen". The classicist Sophie Schoess characterises it as "a statue type that simultaneously seduces the viewer and holds them at bay".

== Description ==
The Lely Venus is a marble statue posed in a crouched position, in or around the act of bathing. The figure's head is turned to the right; its right arm is lifted towards the head, as if in the act of adjusting its hair, while the left arm is rested on its left thigh. The statue is approximately 112 centimetres (44 in) in height, 43 centimetres (17 in) in width, and 58 centimetres (23 in) in depth. It is set on an ovoid base, approximately 86 centimetres (34 in) in circumference, and weighs around 600 kilograms (1,300 lb). It is similar to another Crouching Venus, held by the National Archaeological Museum, Naples; both are known by the traditional label of "Diodalsas type", after the sculptor once thought to have executed the Greek original. The art historians Ian Jenkins and Victoria Turner call it "a teasing composition" in which "from whichever viewpoint she is seen, some aspect of Aphrodite's sexuality is always tantalizingly obscured".

The statue is considered to date from the second century CE, during the Roman period, and to be based on an earlier Greek statue of the Hellenistic period, executed either in marble or bronze. The fingers of the right hand have been restored since antiquity, as has the left arm from the elbow downwards. The art historian Cornelius C. Vermeule has argued, by analogy with other examples of the Crouching Venus type, that the restoration of the right arm is incorrect, and that the hand should be set closer to the figure's hair. The statue is otherwise largely intact.

Views of the statue

== Modern history ==
The Lely Venus, as drawn by an anonymous artist in a 1627 inventory of sculptures in Mantua

The statue belonged to the Italian aristocrat and condottiere (mercenary commander) Guidobaldo da Montefeltro from the end of the fourteenth century until 1502; in that year, it was briefly owned by Cesare Borgia, who occupied Guidobaldo's duchy of Urbino on 21 June and seized his palace there, but soon returned to Guidobaldo. A little after 1502, Isabella d'Este, the marchioness consort of the Italian city of Mantua, purchased it for the city's Ducal Palace. (Note: In a letter to The Art Bulletin in 1975, the art historian Clifford M. Brown argued that, while the Lely Venus was certainly the sculpture purchased from Mantua by Charles I, it could not be demonstrated that it was the same sculpture as that acquired by Isabella d'Este.) It was recorded in the 1631 inventory of the collections of the city's Gonzaga rulers.

Duke Vincenzo II Gonzaga of Mantua sold the statue to Charles I of England (r. 1600–1649), alongside several other works of sculpture and the Triumphs of Caesar, a series of paintings by the Renaissance artist Andrea Mantegna, in 1629. (Note: Waywell 1992, p. 311. On the Triumphs of Caesar and Charles's acquisition of the series, see Beard 2007, p. 154. For Vincenzo II, see "Aphrodite or 'Crouching Venus', 199 AD". Royal Collection.) The total cost of the sculptures, plus the Triumphs of Caesar, was £10,500; to these were added a collection of paintings, including Titian's The Entombment and Antonio da Correggio's Allegory of Love, which brought the total sum to £18,280, 12s. 8d. (Note: By way of comparison, this was approximately 3% of Charles's average annual revenue from regular sources between 1631 and 1635, which was £618,376.) Charles's agent, Daniel Nijs, described it in a letter of 1631 to the diplomat Thomas Carey as "the most beautiful sculpture of all"; he also suggested, falsely, that it may be the Venus de Milo or the Helen of Troy sculpted by Praxiteles. (Note: Howarth 1989, p. 78. For the original letter, see Sainsbury (ed.) 1859, pp. 336–337.) It was still in Nijs's house in Venice, unpaid for by Charles, when Nijs's creditors visited him on 13 June 1631, and only left Venice for England (aboard the ship Assurance) on 4 August 1632. A catalogue of Charles's collection, kept in the twentieth century in the Royal Library at Windsor Castle, wrongly identified it as a statue of Helen of Troy.

=== Post–Civil War history ===
After the execution of Charles I in January 1649, the statue was acquired in the Commonwealth Sale, in which it was listed for £600, by Robert Houghton. Houghton, formerly the king's brewer, was the head of the "third dividend", one of the fourteen syndicates of creditors owed money by the Crown, each of which was allotted goods equivalent to 15,000 Spanish escudos, or £3,750. After the Stuart Restoration of 1660, Colonel William Hawley compiled a list of Charles's sculptures that remained outside royal possession; this included the Lely Venus. (Note: Scott-Elliot 1959, p. 219. For Hawley's first name, see "Inventory of Goods Recovered by Colonel William Hawley". Royal Collection.) (Note: The dated entries in the list fall between May 1660 and August 1661.) The statue was bought by the Dutch painter Peter Lely, along with other objects from Charles's collection.

The Lely Venus displayed in the British Museum in 2009

As it had been given to a royal servant, Houghton, in payment of debts owed to him by the Crown, the Lely Venus was exempted from the general requirement under the Indemnity and Oblivion Act of 1660 to return to the Crown goods sold from Charles's property after his execution. Lely died in 1680; the statue was bought by Charles II in 1682 and returned to the Royal Collection. It was displayed in the garden of Charles's palace at Whitehall, and was saved from the fire that destroyed most of the palace on 4 January 1698. After the fire, it was stolen, but it was recovered by the Royal Collection in 1702.

In 1902, the statue was moved from Kensington Palace to Windsor Castle. At some point afterwards, it was lost, but was rediscovered in the 1950s. (Note: Writing in his 1954 work on the Crouching Aphrodite type, the art historian Reinhardt Lullies believed that the statue had been lost in the fire of 1698, and was as yet unrecovered.) In 1955, it was on display, along with other works of the Royal Collection, in the orangery at Windsor Castle. In 1963, it was placed in the British Museum, on permanent loan from Elizabeth II.

In 2005–2006, the statue was included in the National Gallery's exhibition Rubens: A Master in the Making. For the British Museum's "Statuephilia" exhibition in 2008–2009, Siren, a solid gold statue of the supermodel Kate Moss by Marc Quinn, was positioned facing the Lely Venus from the entrance of the Duveen Gallery, which houses the Elgin Marbles taken from the Parthenon. The Lely Venus was the first object displayed to visitors in the museum's exhibition Defining Beauty: The Body in Ancient Greek Art in March–July 2015, curated by Ian Jenkins. A 2017 study quoted museum curators as saying that barriers had been erected around the statue because "people kept patting her behind". In October 2026, it was loaned to the Ashmolean Museum at the University of Oxford for the exhibition Aphrodite: The Making of a Goddess.

== Influence ==
The Lely Venus is the most complete instance of the Crouching Venus type to have survived into the Renaissance period. The Italian painter Raphael, whose father was a painter and poet in Guidobaldo's court, may have seen the statue; his unfinished Esterházy Madonna (painted between 1507 and 1508) poses the Virgin Mary in a manner similar to the Crouching Venus, and the art historian Selma Holo sees a preparatory drawing made by Raphael for the painting as specifically echoing the Lely Venus.

The Italian artist Marcantonio Raimondi made a print based on the Lely Venus in 1509; Holo argues that the accuracy of the drawing indicates that Marcantonio must have seen the statue in Mantua in person. The Flemish artist Peter Paul Rubens may have seen the statue when he visited Italy in 1600; several of his paintings, including his Venus Frigida ("Freezing Venus", 1614 (Note: For the date, see Baudouin 2004, p. 34.)) and his Three Nymphs with a Cornucopia (c. 1625 – c. 1628), show the goddess or related mythological figures in a similar pose to the Lely Venus. It may have been used by the French sculptor Antoine Coysevox as a model for his bronze version of the Crouching Venus type, made in 1686 for the French royal residence at Versailles. The Flemish sculptor John Nost probably used it as the model for his own Crouching Venus, executed in 1702. Adam Buck included a depiction of it in a watercolour of 1801.

Artworks based (or suggested to be based) on the Lely Venus
Study for the Esterházy Madonna, by Raphael, made between 1507 and 1508

Engraving of Venus in a fantastical landscape, made by Marcantonio Raimondi in 1509

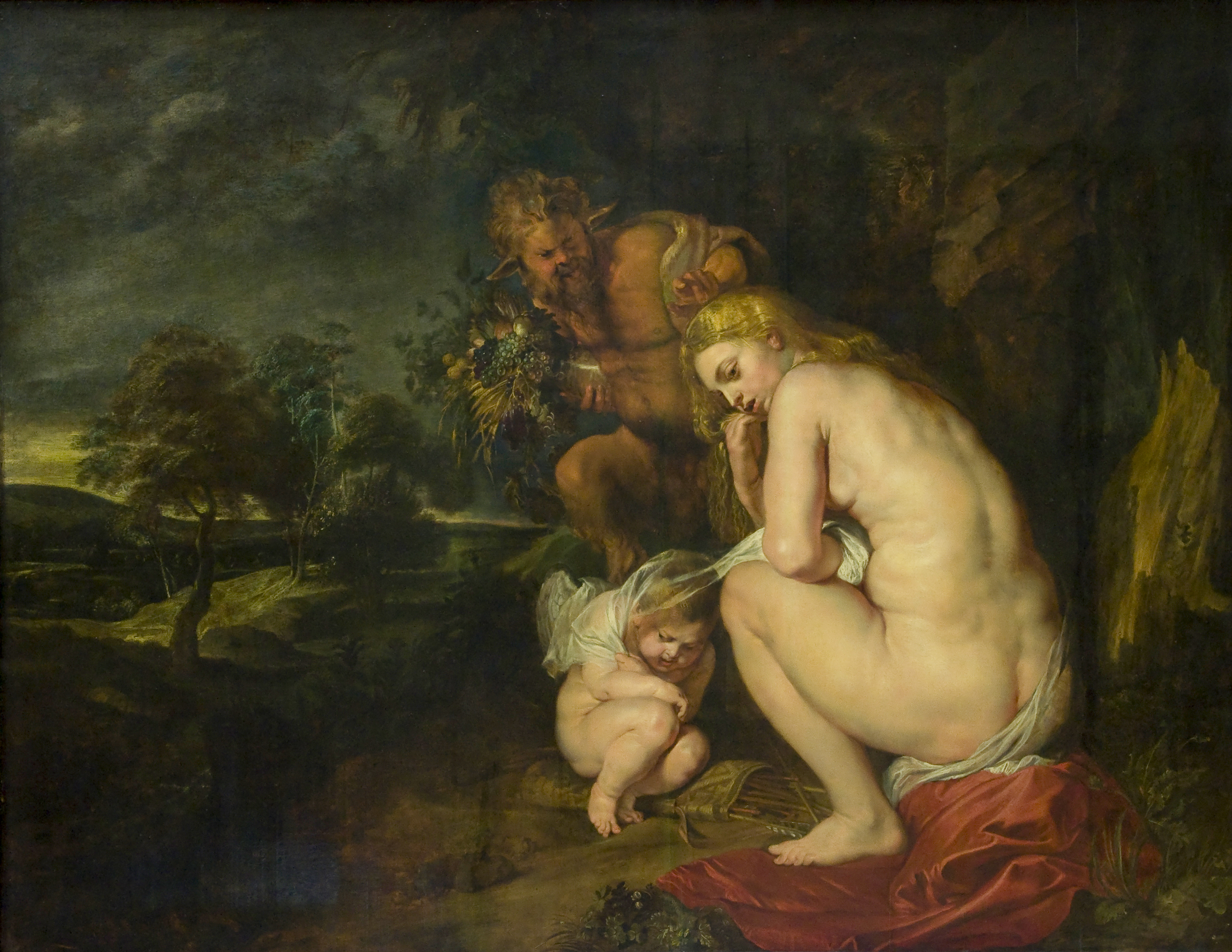
Venus Frigida ("Freezing Venus"), painted by Peter Paul Rubens in 1614

Marble version of Venus accroupie ("Crouching Venus") by Antoine Coysevox, sculpted in 1686

Crouching Venus (1702), by John Nost

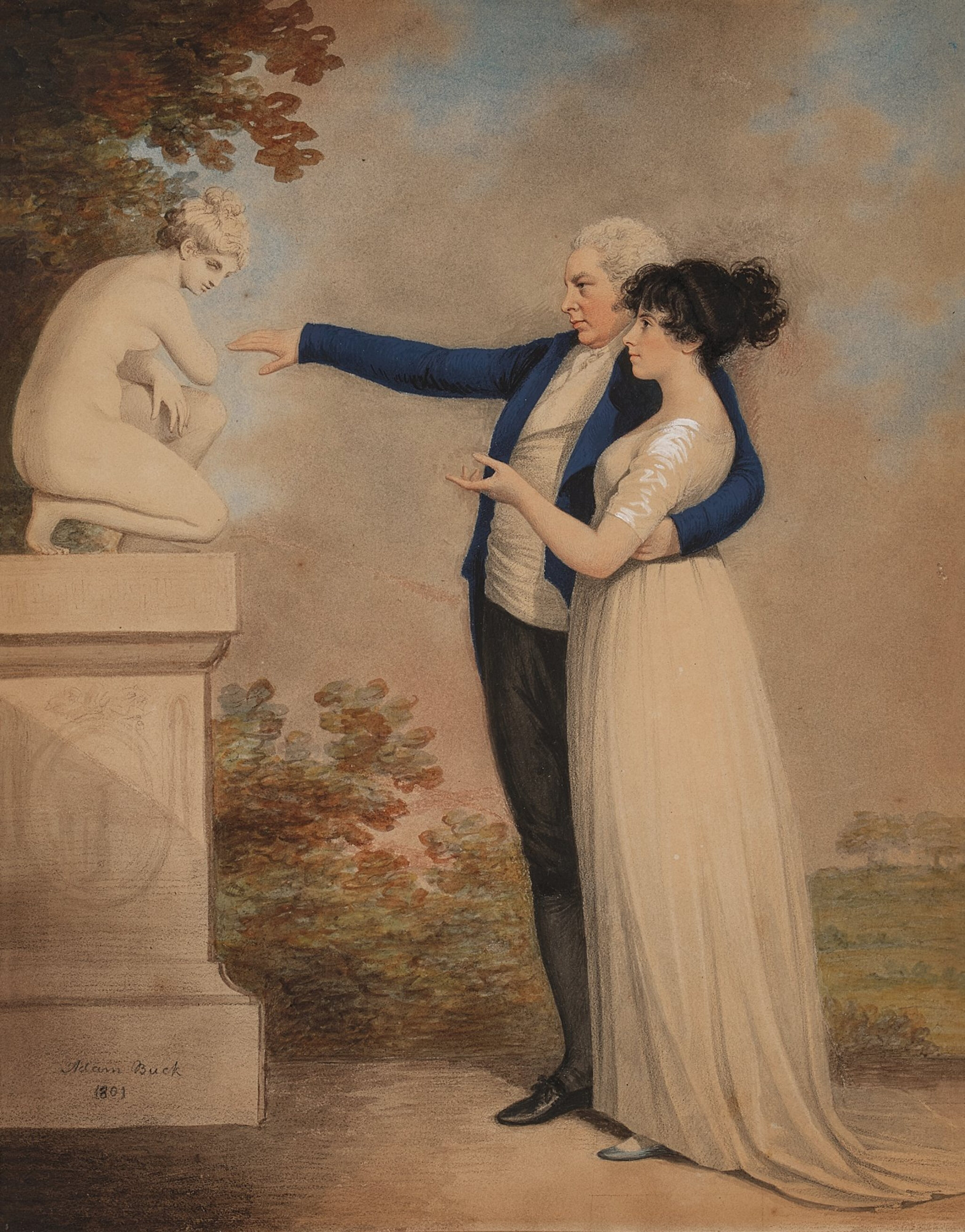
Adam Buck's 1801 watercolour "An Elegant Couple Admiring the Lely Venus"

== Bibliography ==
- Ajootian, Aileen (1996). "Praxiteles". In Palagia, Olga; Pollitt, J. J. (eds.). Personal Styles in Greek Sculpture. Cambridge University Press. pp. 91–129. ISBN 0-521-55187-0.
- Aylmer, Gerald Edward (1974) [1961]. The King's Servants: The Civil Service of Charles I, 1625–1642 (Revised ed.). London and Boston: Routledge & Kegan Paul. ISBN 0-7100-7894-3.
- Barclay, Andrew (2015). "Recovering Charles I's Art Collection: Some Implications of the 1660 Act of Indemnity and Oblivion". Historical Research. 88 (242): 629–649. doi:10.1111/1468-2281.12099.
- Baudouin, Frans (2004). Rubens in Antwerp. Eke: Ludion. ISBN 90-5544-515-0.
- Beard, Mary (2007). The Roman Triumph. Cambridge, Massachusetts: Harvard University Press. ISBN 978-0674-03218-7.
- Brown, Clifford M. (1975). "Letters to the Editor". The Art Bulletin. 57 (3): 466–467. JSTOR 3049425.
- Candlin, Fiona (2017). "Rehabilitating Unauthorised Touch or Why Museum Visitors Touch the Exhibits". The Senses and Society. 12 (3): 251–266. doi:10.1080/17458927.2017.1367485.
- Cumming, Valerie (1989). "'Great Vanity and Excesse in Apparell': Some Clothing and Furs of Tudor and Stuart Royalty". In MacGregor, Arthur (ed.). The Late King's Goods: Collections, Possessions, and Patronage of Charles I in the Light of the Commonwealth Sale Inventories. Oxford University Press. pp. 322–350. ISBN 0-19-920171-4 – via Internet Archive.
- Dalivalle, Margaret (2019). "Collecting Leonardo at the Stuart Courts". Leonardo’s Salvator Mundi and the Collecting of Leonardo in the Stuart Courts. By Simon, Robert; Kemp, Kemp; Dalivalle, Margaret. Oxford University Press. pp. 135–279. ISBN 978-0-19-881383-5.
- Draper, James David (2014). "Fisherboy and Friend". The Passions of Jean-Baptiste Carpeaux. By Draper, James David; Papet, Edouard. New York: Metropolitan Museum of Art. pp. 96–106. ISBN 978-0-300-20431-5.
- Havelock, Christine (1995). The Aphrodite of Knidos and Her Successors: A Historical Review of the Female Nude in Greek Art. Ann Arbor: University of Michigan Press. ISBN 0-472-10585-X – via Internet Archive.
- Higgins, Reynold A. (1967). "Recent Acquisitions by the British Museum". Archaeological Reports. 13: 47–52. JSTOR 580975.
- Holo, Selma (1979). "A Note on the Afterlife of the 'Crouching Aphrodite' in the Renaissance". The J. Paul Getty Museum Journal. 6/7: 23–36. JSTOR 4166385.
- Howarth, David (1989). "Charles I: Sculpture and Sculptors". In MacGregor, Arthur (ed.). The Late King's Goods: Collections, Possessions, and Patronage of Charles I in the Light of the Commonwealth Sale Inventories. Oxford University Press. pp. 73–113. ISBN 0-19-920171-4 – via Internet Archive.
- Jenkins, Ian D.; Turner, Victoria (2009). The Greek Body. London: British Museum Press. ISBN 978-1-60606-002-5.
- Jones, Jonathan (5 October 2026). "Aphrodite Review – A Trashy Way to Treat the Goddess of Love". The Guardian.
- Kalinski, Karl, II (1992). "Thoughts on the Crouching Aphrodite". Source: Notes in the History of Art. 12 (1): 1–6. JSTOR 23207834.
- Linfert, Andreas (1969). "Die Meister der 'Kauernden Aphrodite'" [The Masters of the Crouching Aphrodite]. Mitteilungen des Deutschen Archäologischen Instituts, Athenische Abteilung (in German). 84: 158–164.
- Lullies, Reinhardt (1954). Die kauernde Aphrodite [The Crouching Aphrodite] (in German). Munich: Filser-Verlag. OCLC 10185759.
- MacGregor, Arthur (1989). "The Household Below Stairs: Officers and Equipment of the Stuart Court". In MacGregor, Arthur (ed.). The Late King's Goods: Collections, Possessions, and Patronage of Charles I in the Light of the Commonwealth Sale Inventories. Oxford University Press. pp. 367–386. ISBN 0-19-920171-4 – via Internet Archive.
- Mallalieu, Huon (2015). "Bodies Beautiful and Music of Time". The London Magazine. Vol. August/September 2015. pp. 97–102.
- Sainsbury, William Noël, ed. (1859). Original Unpublished Papers Illustrative of the Life of Sir Peter Paul Rubens as an Artist and a Diplomatist. London: Bradbury & Evans. OL 16415120M – via Internet Archive.
- Schoess, A. Sophie (2021). "Visualizing Actaeon: The Motif of Recognition in Nonnus' Treatment of the Metamorphosis". In Dorozewski, Filip; Jażdżewska (eds.). Nonnus of Panopolis in Context III: Old Questions and New Perspectives. Memnosyne Supplements. Vol. 438. Leiden: Brill. pp. 161–177. ISBN 978-90-04-44323-5.
- Scott-Elliot, Aydua H. (1959). "The Statues from Mantua in the Collection of King Charles I". The Burlington Magazine. 101 (675): 214, 218–227. JSTOR 872801.
- Squire, Michael (2015). "Bodies Beautiful". Apollo: The International Magazine for Collectors. 181 (632): 116.
- Squire, Michael (2019). "'Casual Classicism': In Conversation with Marc Quinn". International Journal of the Classical Tradition. 26 (2): 195–235. doi:10.1007/s12138-017-0451-9. JSTOR 48698719.
- Trusted, Marjorie (2012). "Two Eighteenth-Century Sculpture Acquisitions for the Victoria and Albert Museum, London". The Burlington Magazine. 154 (1316): 773–779. JSTOR 41813351.
- Vermeule, Cornelius C. (1955). "Notes on a New Edition of Michaelis: Ancient Marbles in Great Britain". American Journal of Archaeology. 59 (2): 129–150. JSTOR 501104.
- Vermeule, Cornelius C. (1956). "Review: Die Kauernde Aphrodite by Reinhard Lullies". American Journal of Archaeology. 60 (4): 460–462. JSTOR 500890.
- Vout, Caroline (2018). Classical Art: A Life History from Antiquity to the Present. Princeton University Press. ISBN 978-0-691-17703-8.
- Waywell, Geoffrey (1992). "Art". In Jenkyns, Richard (ed.). The Legacy of Rome: A New Appraisal. Oxford University Press. pp. 295–328. ISBN 0-19-821917-2.
