= Sine Cerere et Baccho friget Venus =

Proverb

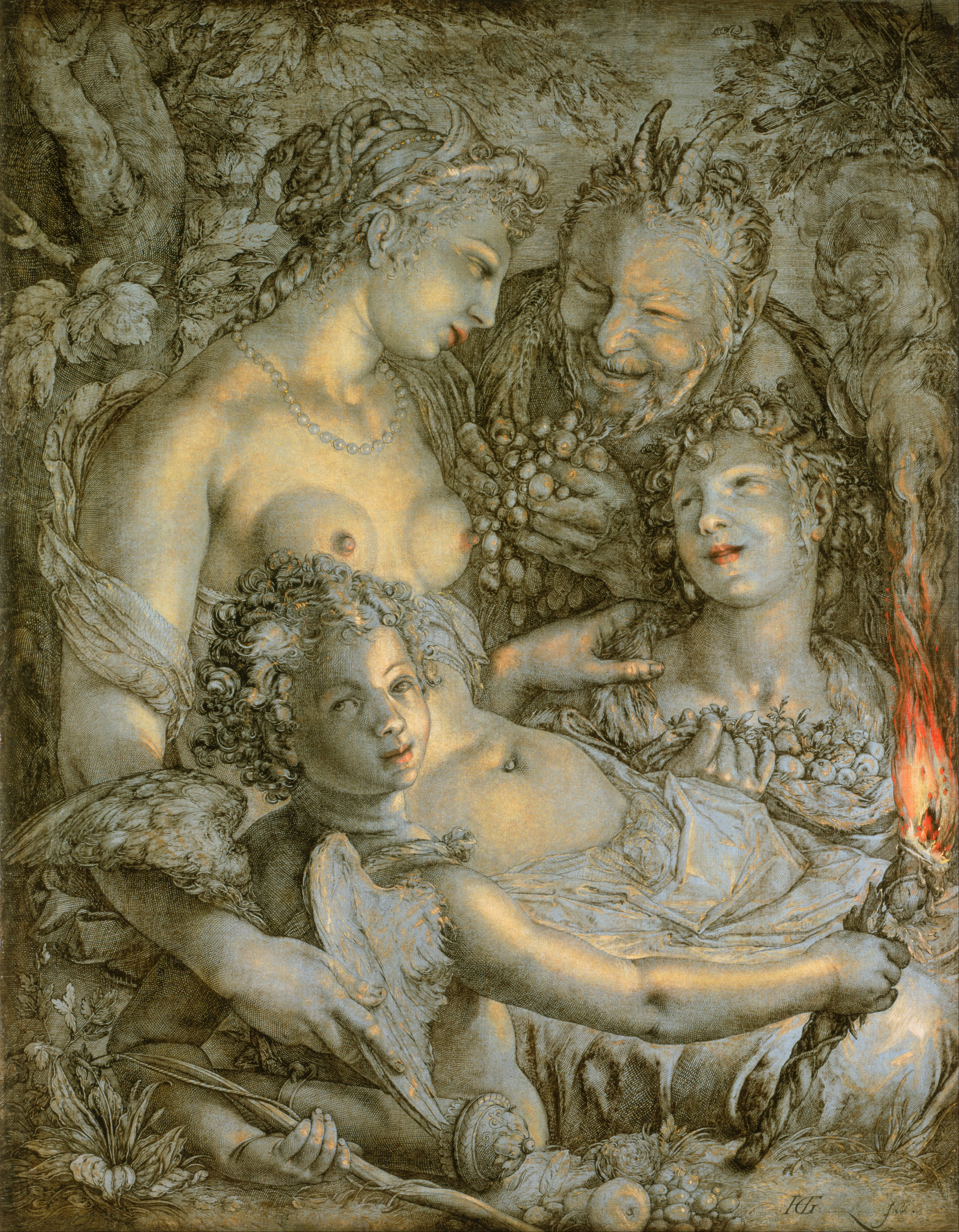
Hendrick Goltzius, 1600–03, the Philadelphia "pen painting"

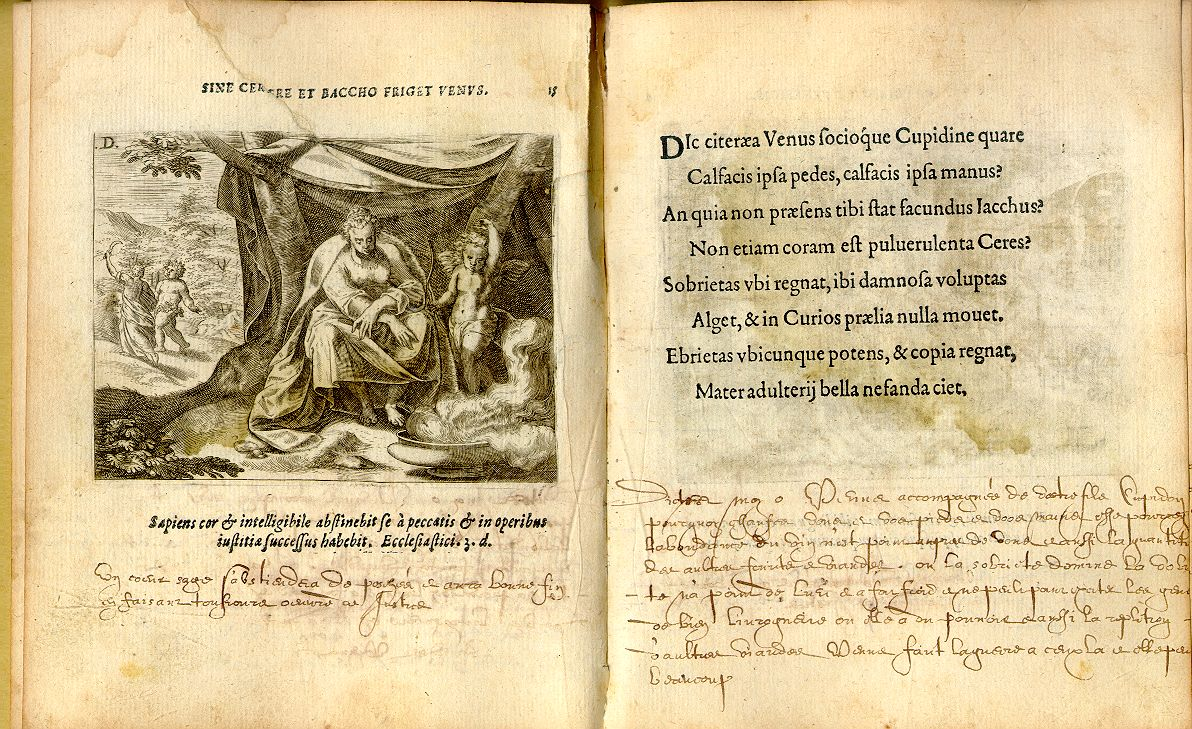
Mikrokosmos emblem book, 1579: "Venus is left shivering in front of a makeshift fire while Bacchus and Ceres wander away".

"Sine Cerere et Baccho friget Venus", (Latin, 'Without Ceres and Bacchus, Venus would freeze') or "Sine Cerere et Libero friget Venus", is a quotation from the Roman comedian Terence (c. 195/185 – c. 159 BC) that became a proverb in the Early Modern period. Its simplest level of meaning is that love needs food and wine to thrive. It was sometimes shown in art, especially in the period 1550–1630, in Northern Mannerism in Prague and the Low Countries, as well as by Rubens.

It has been suggested that the concentration of images by the Haarlem Mannerists reflects the patronage of the powerful brewers of Haarlem.

== Proverb ==
The phrase derives from Terence's comedy Eunuchus, in which Chremes says to Pythias in the fifth scene of the fourth act (732), verbum hercle hoc verum erit "sine Cerere et Libero friget Venus" ('That saying, "Without Ceres and Liber, Venus would freeze" is absolutely true!'). Thus, the phrase was probably a well-known proverb at the time as well. Chremes makes use of it to declare how Pythias seems even more beautiful than usual to him during the rowdy partying after a large meal. Liber, the son of Ceres and god of human prosperity (and also of wine), was later replaced with Bacchus. The phrase is found in a similar form in Cicero, who quotes it as an example of the stylistic device of metonymy. In later times it was universally attributed to Terence.

In the Middle Ages, Caesarius of Heisterbach used it in his work, Dialogus miraculorum to warn against luxury and frivolity and to advocate an ascetic lifestyle. It was also employed in this moral sense in the influential Latin florilegium, Manipulus florum (1306) by Thomas of Ireland as part of a passage misattributed to Saint Jerome (https://manipulus-project.wlu.ca/MFfontes/AbstinenciaH.pdf). Martin Luther quoted it in this sense as well, in a 1518 sermon against the seven deadly sins. With the arrival of Renaissance humanism, the proverb was included with a broader sense in various compilations, such as the Adagia of Erasmus. The earliest German use is in a compilation from Klagenfurt dating to 1468: An wein und brot Leidet Venus not ('Without wine and bread, Venus is not in good stead'). Further German variants include:

- Ohne Wein und Brot ist Venus tot. ('Without wine and bread, Venus is dead')
- Ohn Speis und Trank ist Venus krank. ('Without a meal and a drink, Venus is sick')
- Ohne Kost und ohne Wein kann die Liebe nicht gedeihn. ('Without food and without wine, love cannot shine')

Shakespeare's line in Twelfth Night, "Dost thou think because thou art virtuous, there shall be no more cakes and ale", may be an inverted reference.

== Subject in art ==
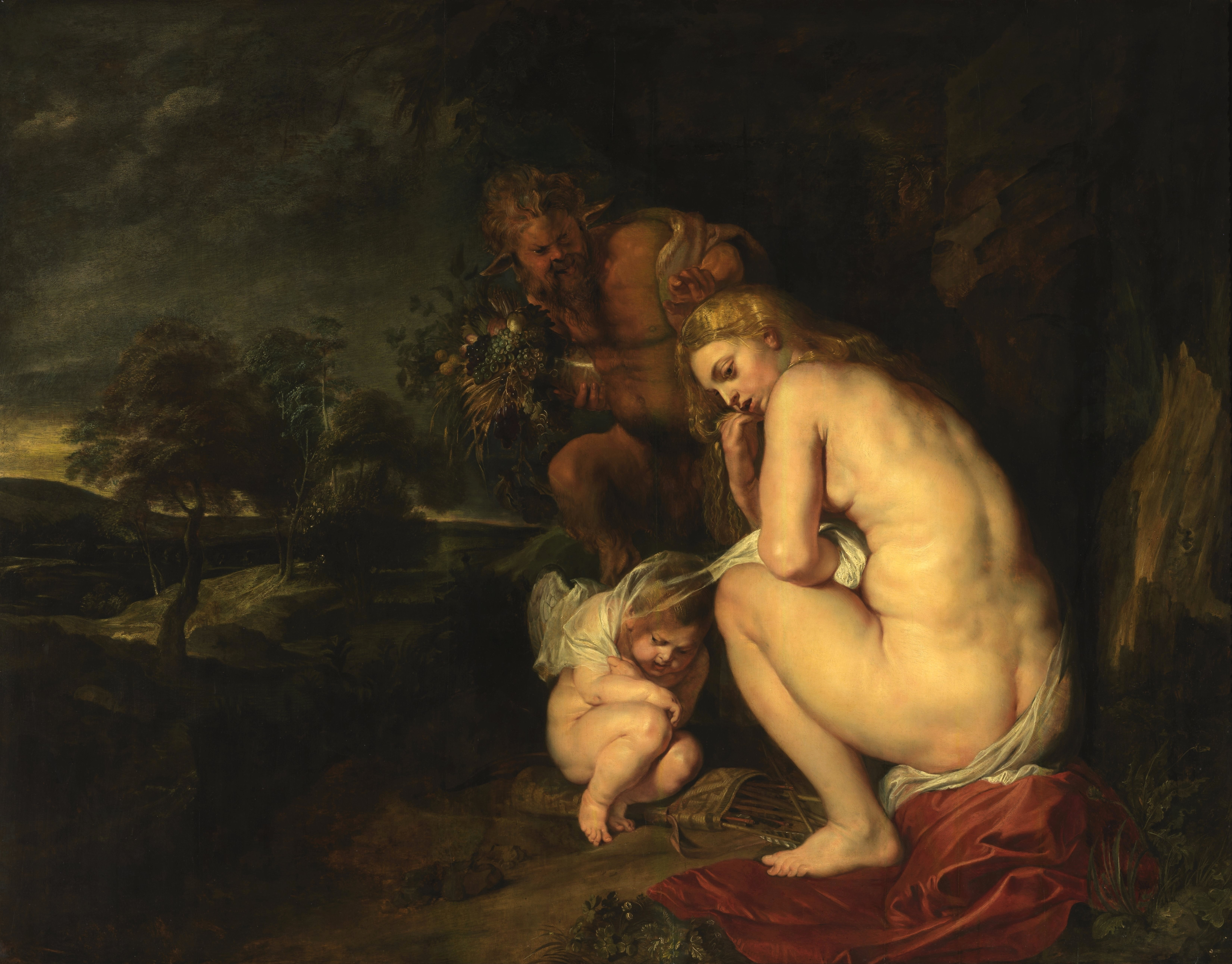
Venus Frigida, Rubens 1615, Koninklijk Museum voor Schone Kunsten, Antwerp. Venus and Cupid are freezing, as a satyr arrives with a fruit bowl

Depictions in art divide into those showing Venus, typically with an accompanying Cupid, either "freezing", without food and drink (or much in the way of clothing), or more comfortable when supplied with them, usually by the other gods in person. The latter type is more common, but Bartholomeus Spranger and Rubens are among the artists who used both types. Like the Feast of the Gods, another subject popular among the Northern Mannerists, the subject offers the combination of a relatively obscure classical reference and the opportunity for plentiful nudity. The subject appears in paintings, drawings and prints, and compositions are often copied between these media, and between artists.

Initially the depiction of this motif were closely tied to text and was found mostly in emblem books, with the first appearance in the Picta poesis of 1552, by Barthélemy Aneau. The Mikrokosmos, an emblem book of 1579 by the Dutch poet Laurentius Haechtanus may be the first depiction of the shivering Venus, as Ceres and Bacchus walk away. The Latin text makes clear that the motif is to be understood as a warning against excessive feasting and drinking because they stimulate sexual desire:

Explain, Cytheran Venus, and Cupid too:
Why do you warm your own feet, warm your own hands?
Perhaps because eloquent Iacchos is not helping you?
Isn't dusty Ceres around either?
Where sobriety reigns, harmful lust freezes
and no war is waged against the curier.
Wherever powerful drunkenness and excess reign,
the mother of adultery begins her ruthless war.

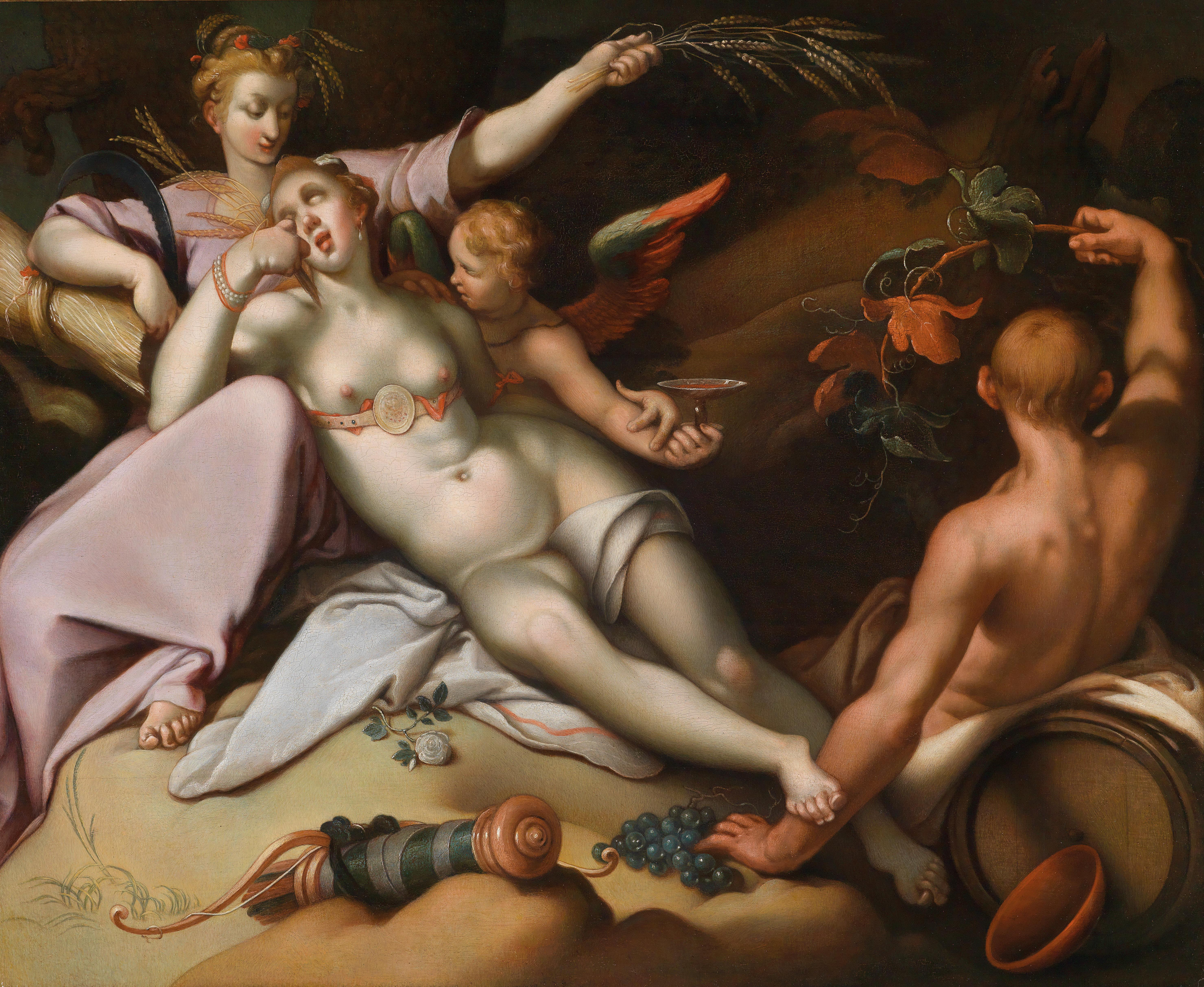
Abraham Bloemaert, early 17th century

The motif was especially favoured in the late sixteenth and early seventeenth centuries in the Netherlands and in the circle of mannerist artists at the court of Emperor Rudolf II in Prague.

Early examples of the motif as the subject of an independent painting are Spranger's pair of paintings of about 1590, and Hans von Aachen's Bacchus, Ceres und Amor (1598), all painted for Rudolf II. The Spranger was turned into a print in Amsterdam in about 1597 by Jan Harmensz. Muller. Hendrick Goltzius produced at least 10 versions of the subject, including a monumental work in the unusual technique of pen and limited colour on canvas, here highly effective (illustrated here). This was also (probably) in Rudolf's collection, then in the royal collections of Sweden and England, and is now in the Philadelphia Museum of Art. A different work on the subject in the same technique is in the Hermitage, which includes a self-portrait by Goltzius in the background.

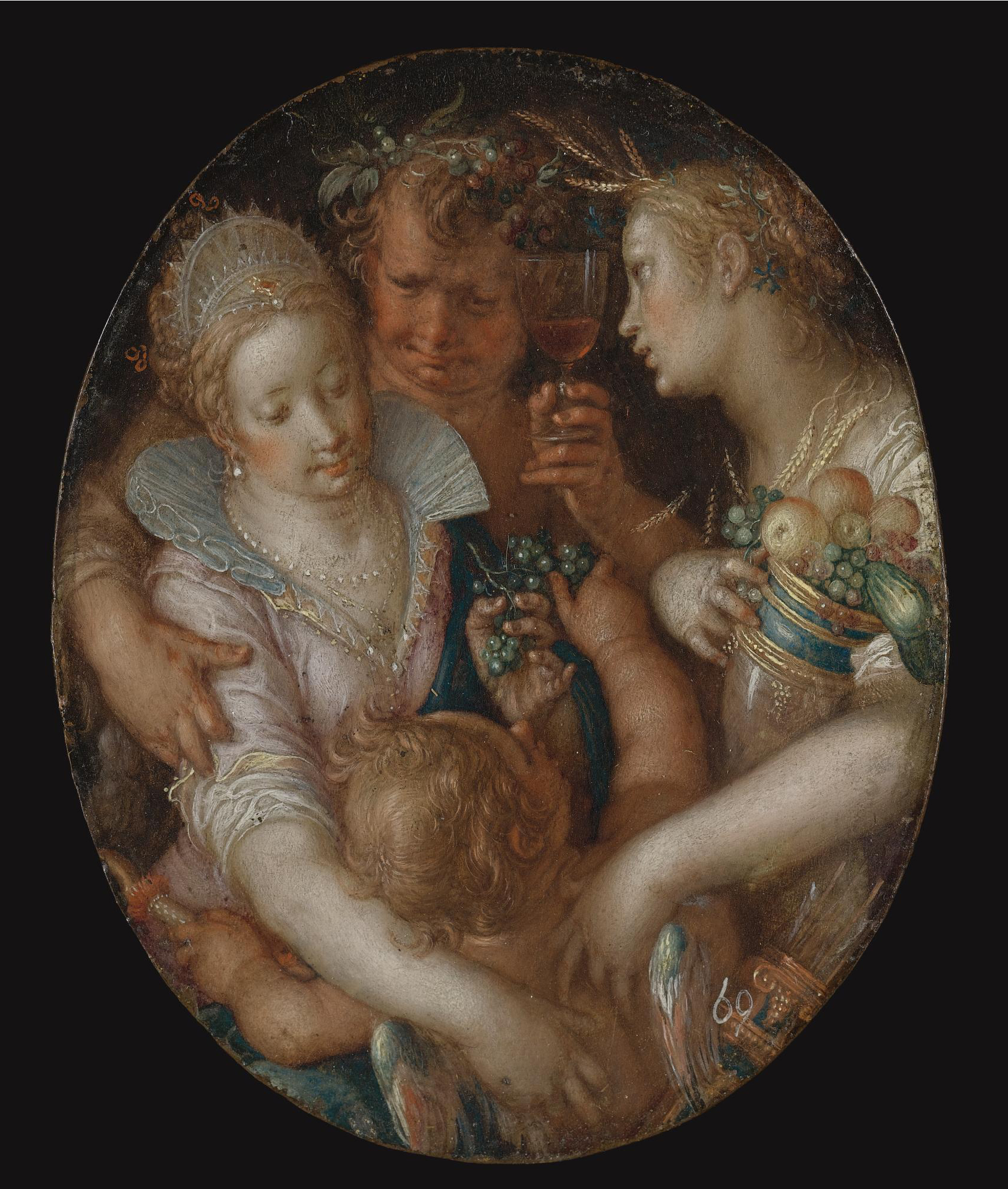
Cabinet painting, about 1605, by Joachim Wtewael

Especially in Goltzius' version, the undertones of danger and the moral point of the allegory are still clear, although the motif later moved far from a narrow moral message about personal moderation.

Several of the print versions carry the proverb text, which it was presumably felt needed stating for a wider public. Reference to the motif is uncertain in some works, or groups of works, but it is at least arguable that any combination of the three gods, with or without Amor, carries a reference to it, as there is no other context that brings this particular group together. Two different sets of prints by Goltzius showed each of the three gods in turn; in one set, engraved by Jan Saenredam, each is surrounded by worshippers. Two late paintings by Joachim Wtewael show half-length portraits of Bacchus and Ceres, and it is presumed that a Venus is missing to complete the set; another small painting by Wtewael shows the three gods, and Amor, together.

Rubens employed the motif repeatedly in different ways, including the visibly freezing Venus Frigida, a version with Amor who desperately attempts to start a fire, and one with Venus at the Moment maßvollen Erwärmens und ruhigen Erwachens ('Moment of modestly warming and quietly waking') in which she hesitantly accepts a wine cup from Bacchus. Italian artists rarely depicted it, whether because it came from the mainly northern tradition of emblem books or because the subject had less resonance in a warmer climate. Exceptions are a painting by Pietro Liberi and a print by Agostino Carracci after one by Goltzius. After the baroque period the motif no longer appears often.

=== Haarlem brewers' propaganda ===
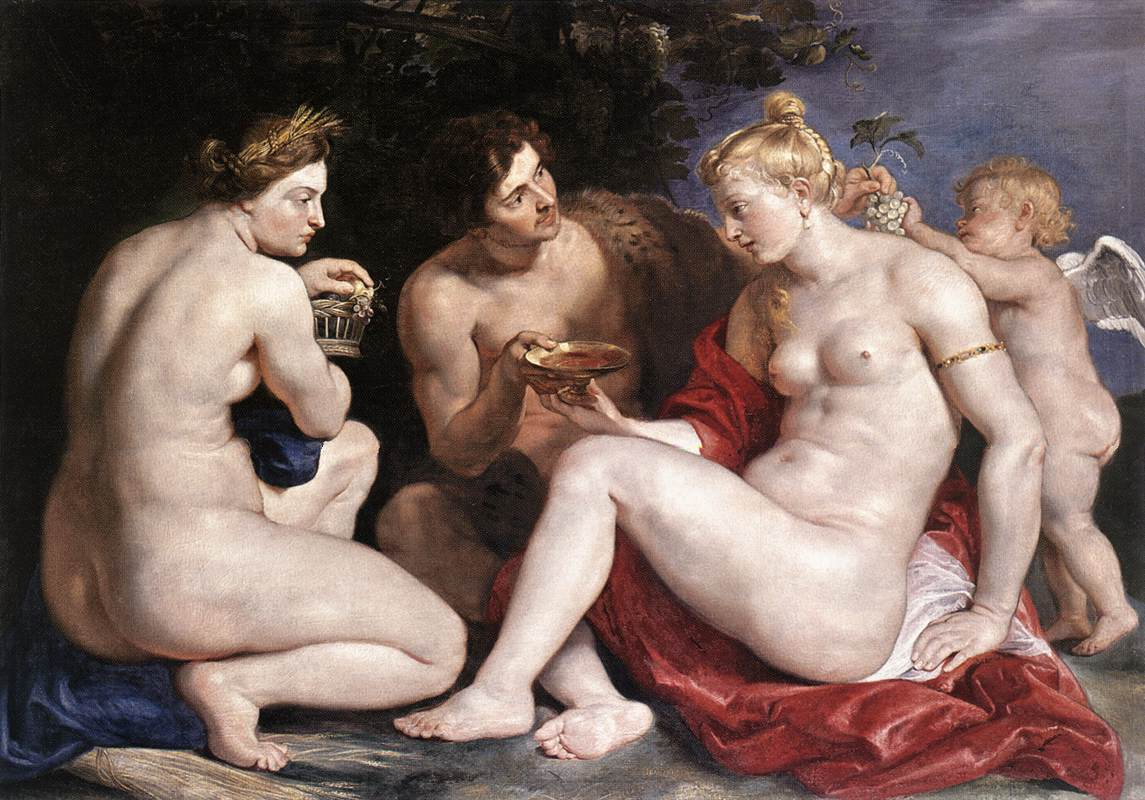
Rubens 1612/13, Staatliche Museen, Kassel

The Calvinist Dutch Republic had complex and conflicted attitudes to both sex and alcohol. Several prominent painters had problems with drink, and the issues were discussed by the biographer and artist Karel van Mander, as part of much wider discussions in Dutch culture. A paper of 2012 by R. de Mambro Santos discusses the motif in this context, and proposes that the depiction of the subject was greatly affected by the big brewers of Haarlem. According to Santos, van Mander can be seen to connect excessive drinking with wine, while beer is presented in his writings and art as a safer and more wholesome product.

Both Bacchus, as by extension the god of all alcoholic drinks, and Ceres, as the goddess covering the raw materials, were symbolic of beer, and a metaphor used by van Mander placed Venus and Cupid as representing the transformative process of actual brewing, by boiling the ingredients; the fire appearing in many images was a further necessity for brewing. According to Santos, at the period when the subject is found in the art of the Haarlem Mannerists, "the economic life of Haarlem was mainly based on the production of beer", and brewers dominated the government of the city, having "assumed the role previously played by the nobility as a leading group in the administration of the town". Brouwershofje, an almshouse complex in the city, has more information on the Haarlem brewers' guild.

In particular Jan Mathijsz Ban was a leading brewer, a friend of artists and a significant collector, spending many weeks touring Italy with Goltzius. With another brewer, he was the dedicatee of the central part of van Manders' Schilder-boeck. Van Mander praises the taste and knowledge of the Haarlem brewers at various points, and "Both Van Mander’s text and Goltzius’ images present Bacchus as a sober, elegant divinity, a gentle and polite god not associated at all with excessive consumption of alcoholic beverages", contrary to much previous imagery.

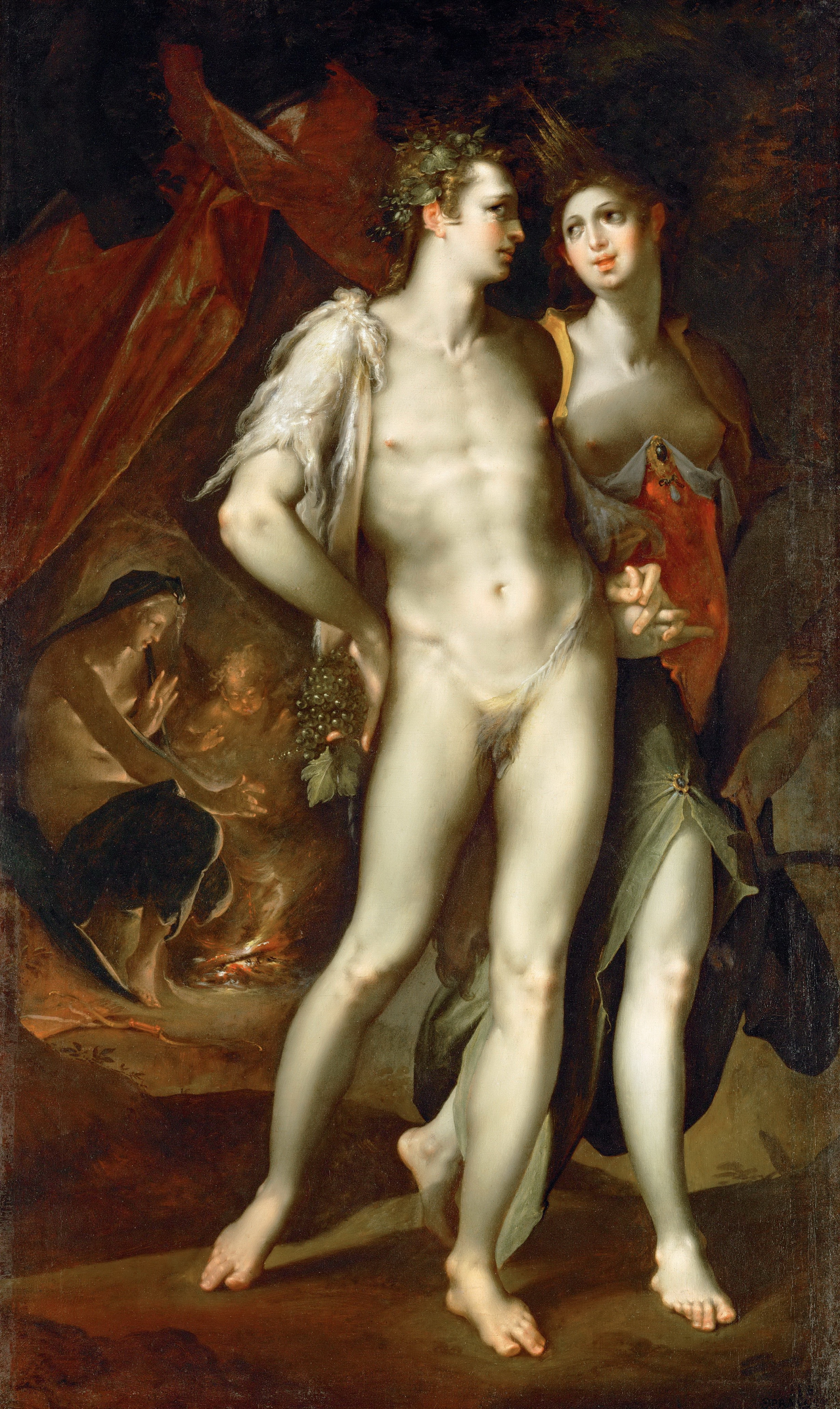
Bartholomäus Spranger, c. 1590, for Rudolf

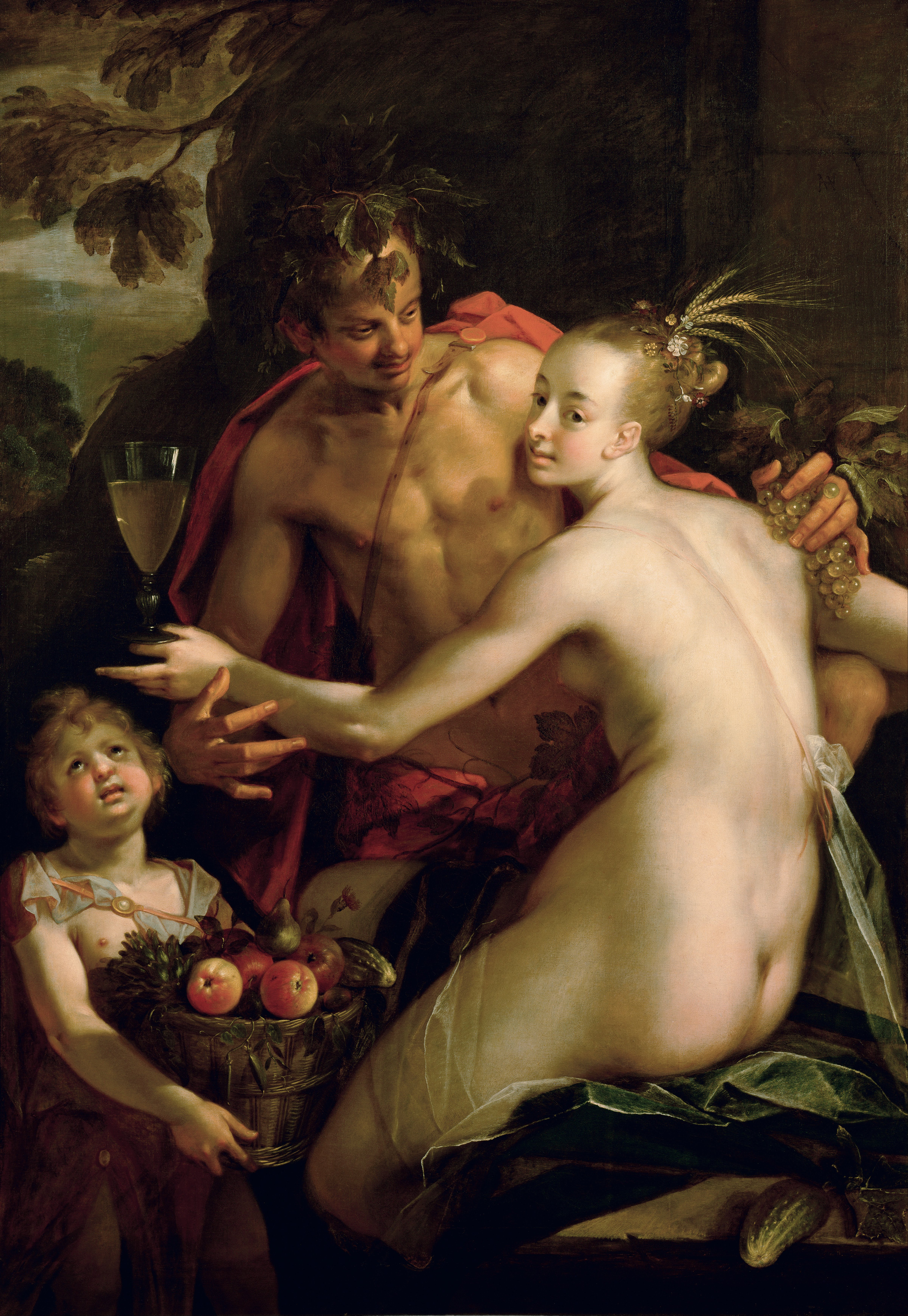
1598, Hans von Aachen: Bacchus, Ceres und Armor

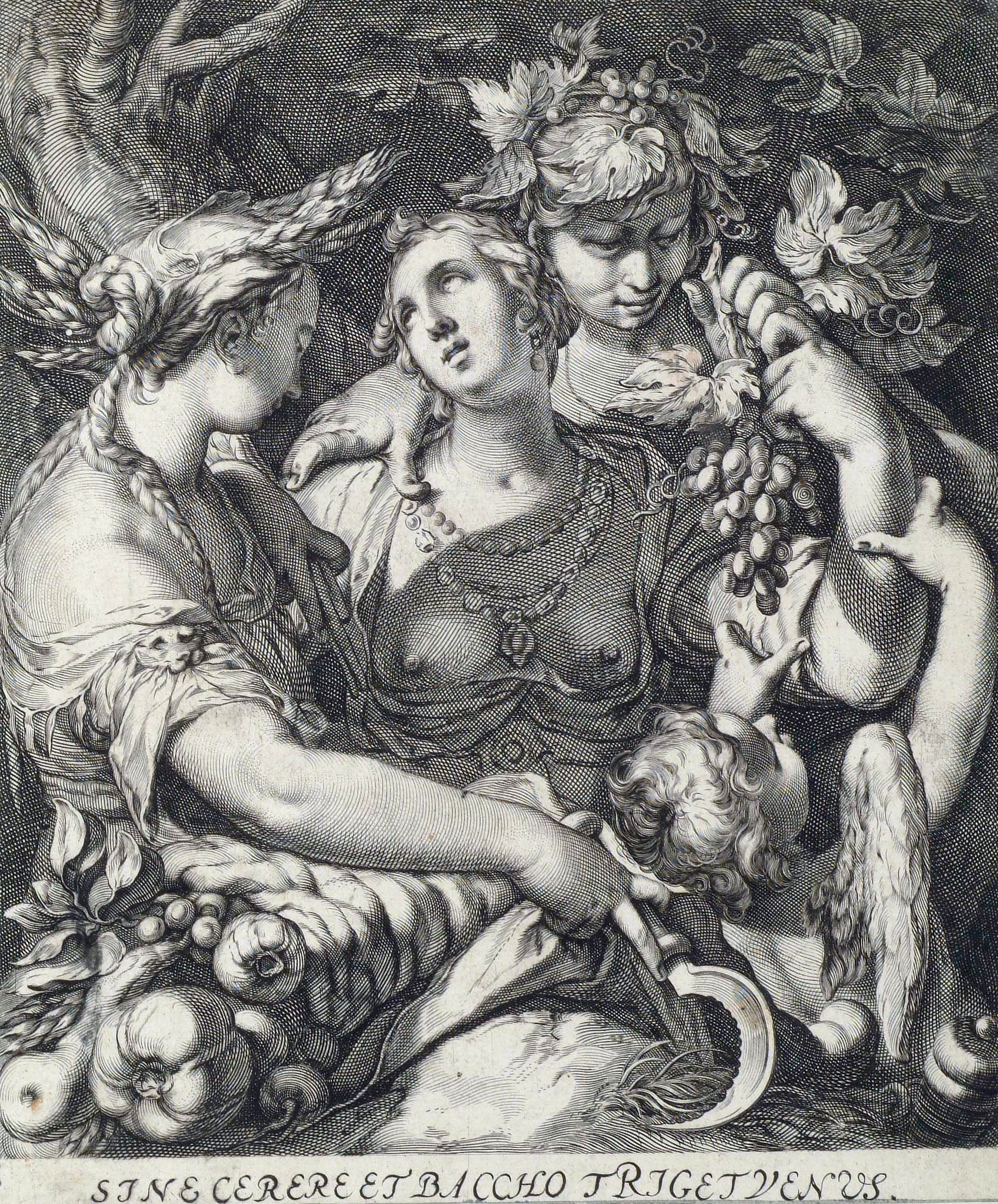
Version of print by Jan Saenredam, after a design by Abraham Bloemaert, c. 1600

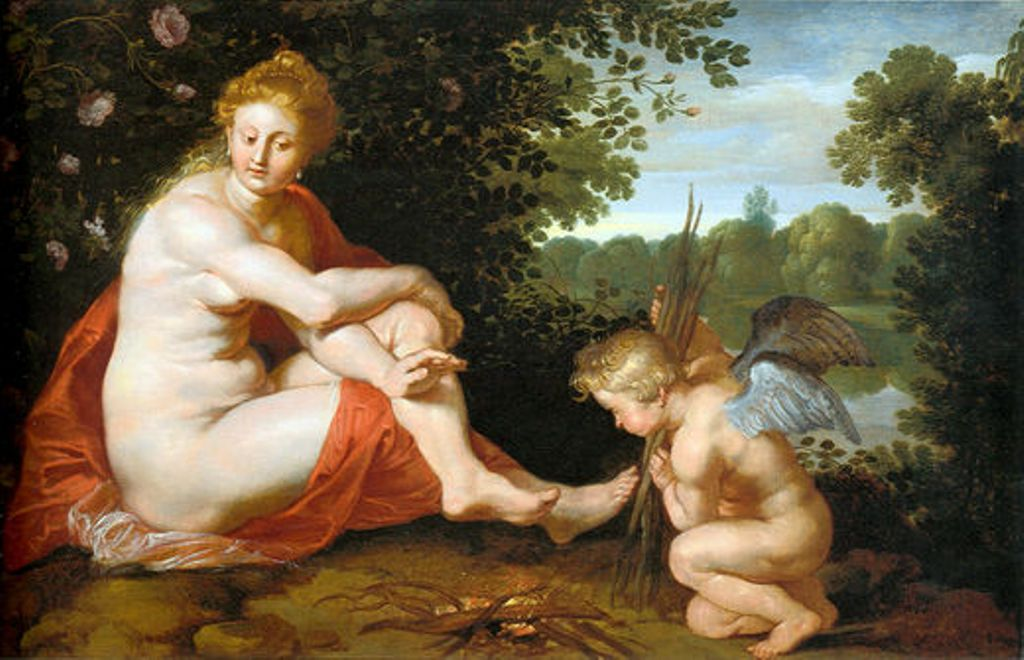
Rubens 1614, Gemäldegalerie der Akademie der Bildenden Künste, Wien

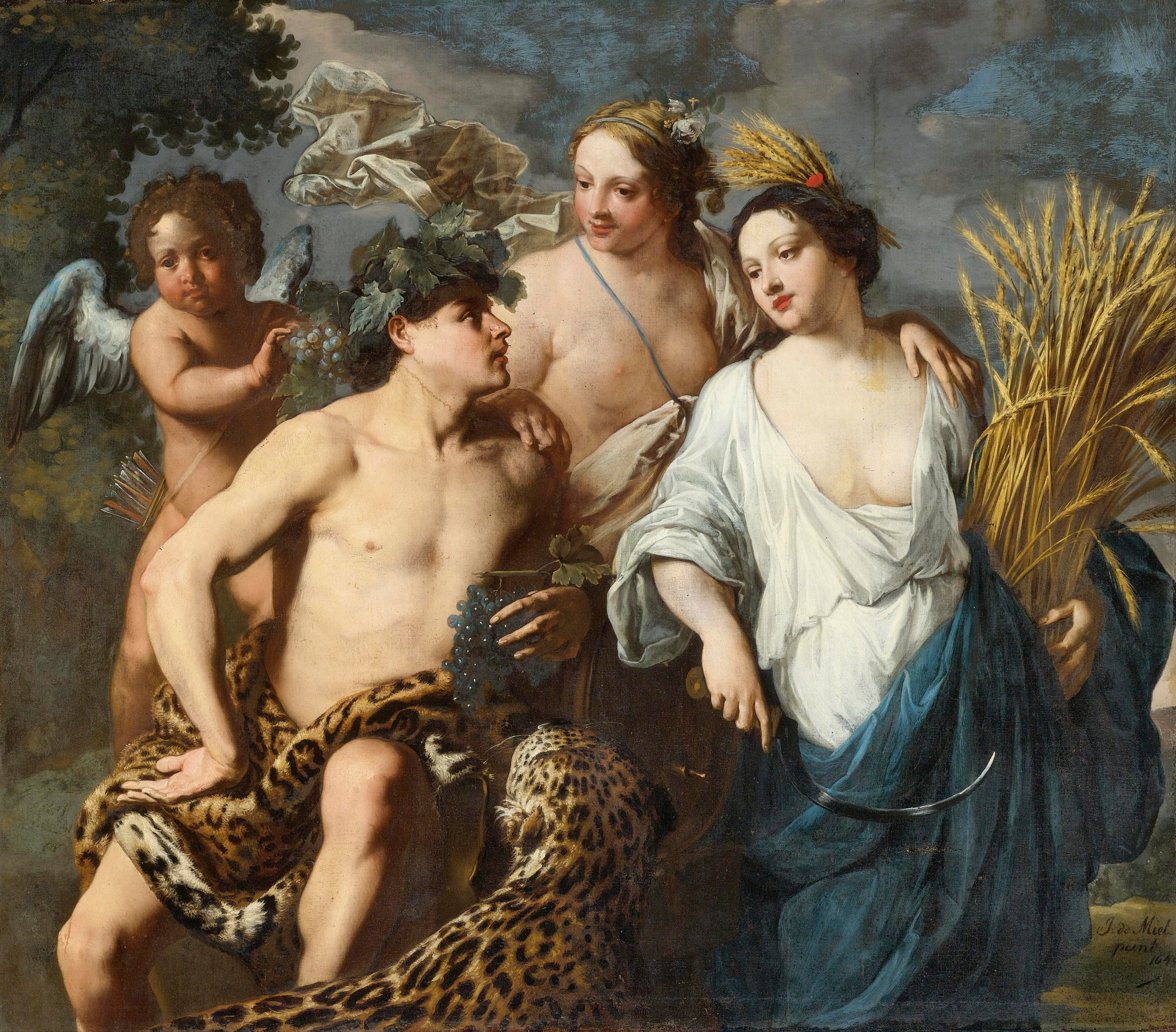
Jan Miel, 1645

== Lord Byron ==
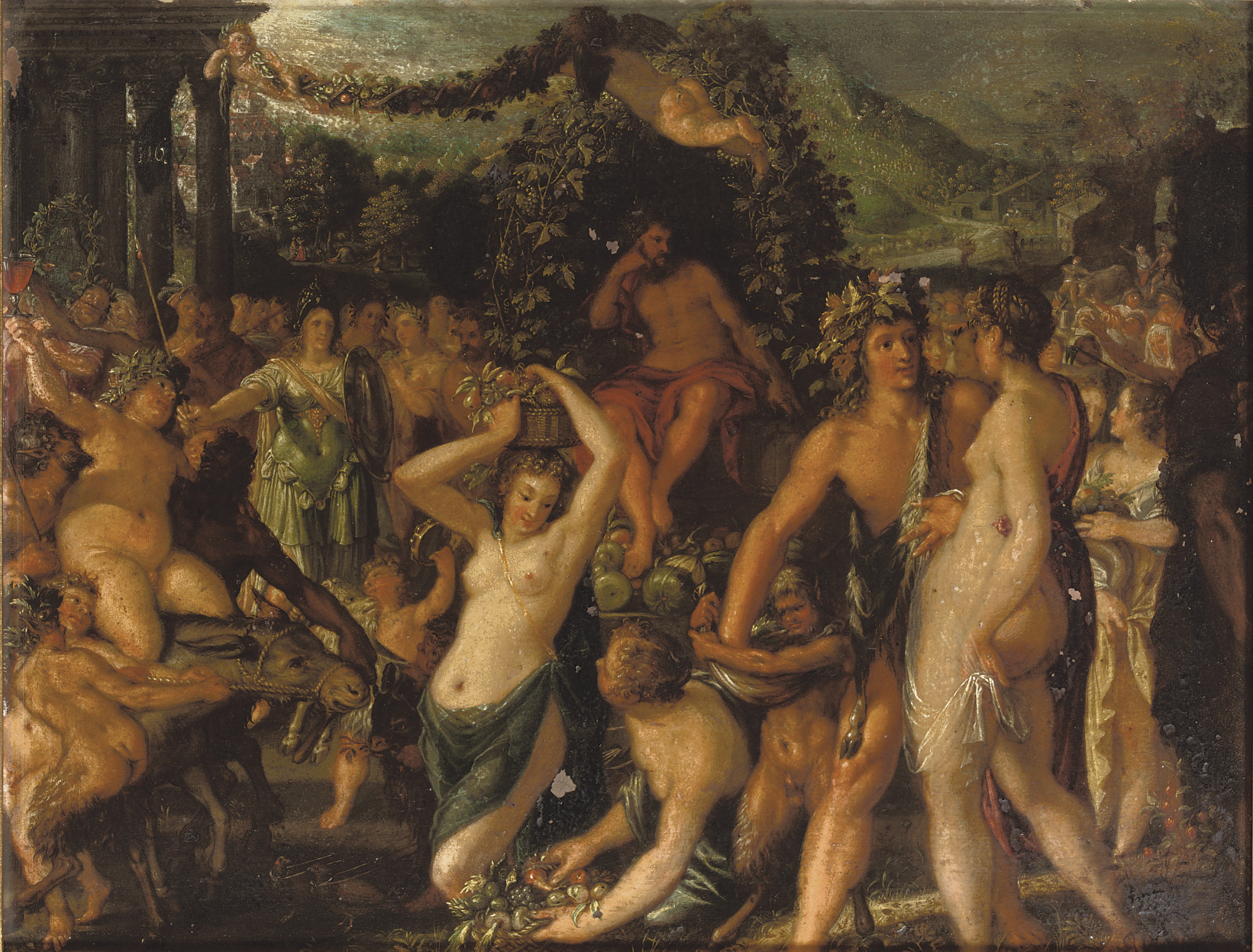
Jacob Hoefnagel, early 17th century

Lord Byron expanded on the proverb in Don Juan:

... some good lessons
Are also learnt from Ceres and from Bacchus
Without whom Venus will not long attack us.
While Venus fills the heart (without heart really
Love, though good always, is not quite so good),
Ceres presents a plate of vermicelli, –
For love must be sustain'd like flesh and blood, –
While Bacchus pours out wine, or hands a jelly.

— Don Juan Canto II, sections 169–170
