= Adam Buck =

Irish artist (1759–1833)

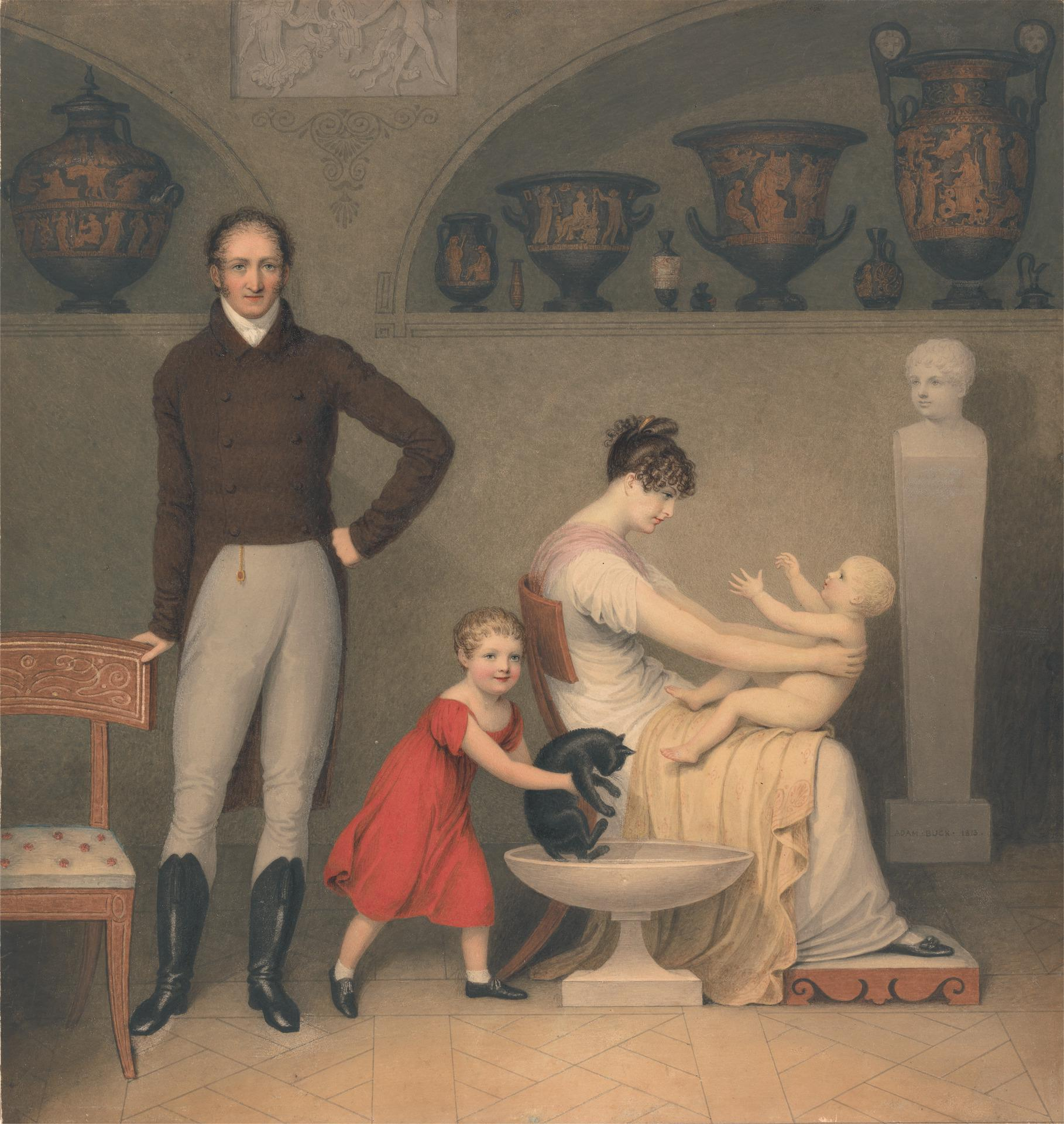
- 1813 self-portrait of Buck with his wife and children
- Born: 1759; Cork, County Cork
- Died: August 1833 (aged 73–74); London, England
- Known for: Portrait; miniature painting; engraving

Adam Buck (1759 – August 1833) was an Irish artist who specialised in neoclassical portraits, including portrait miniatures, and engravings. He was principally active in Dublin and London.

== Life ==
Buck was born in Castle Street, Cork. Becoming an accomplished miniaturist in the 1780s while still in Ireland, he made a permanent move to London in 1795 – his residences there included 174 Piccadilly (1795–8), Frith Street, Soho (1799–1802) and Bentinck Street (1813–20). His patrons included Angelica Catalani (an opera singer), JP Kemble, Sir Francis Burdett, Thomas Hope, George IV, the duke of York and his mistress Mary Anne Clarke. A major influence on Regency culture (producing plates of contemporary costume as well as genre pictures of family and classical scenes and illustrations for Laurence Sterne's Sentimental Journey), he was himself much influenced by the Greek Revival (the furniture, vases - which he collected -, sculptures, costumes and even hairstyles in his works are all ancient Greek). He also acted as a painting teacher, as well as exhibiting more than 170 miniatures and small full-length portraits at the Royal Academy between 1795 and 1833. He died at 15 Upper Seymour Street, London.

== Works ==
- Proposals for publishing by subscription 100 engravings from paintings on Greek vases which have never been published, drawn and etched by Adam Buck from private collections now in England, dedicated to the earl of Carlisle (1811) – intended as a continuation of Sir William Hamilton's Collection of Engravings from Ancient Vases … (1791–7)

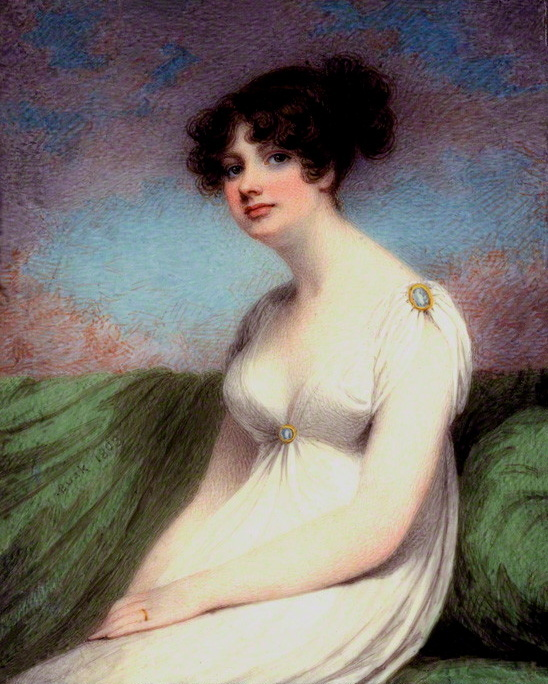
Mary Anne Clarke (née Thompson)

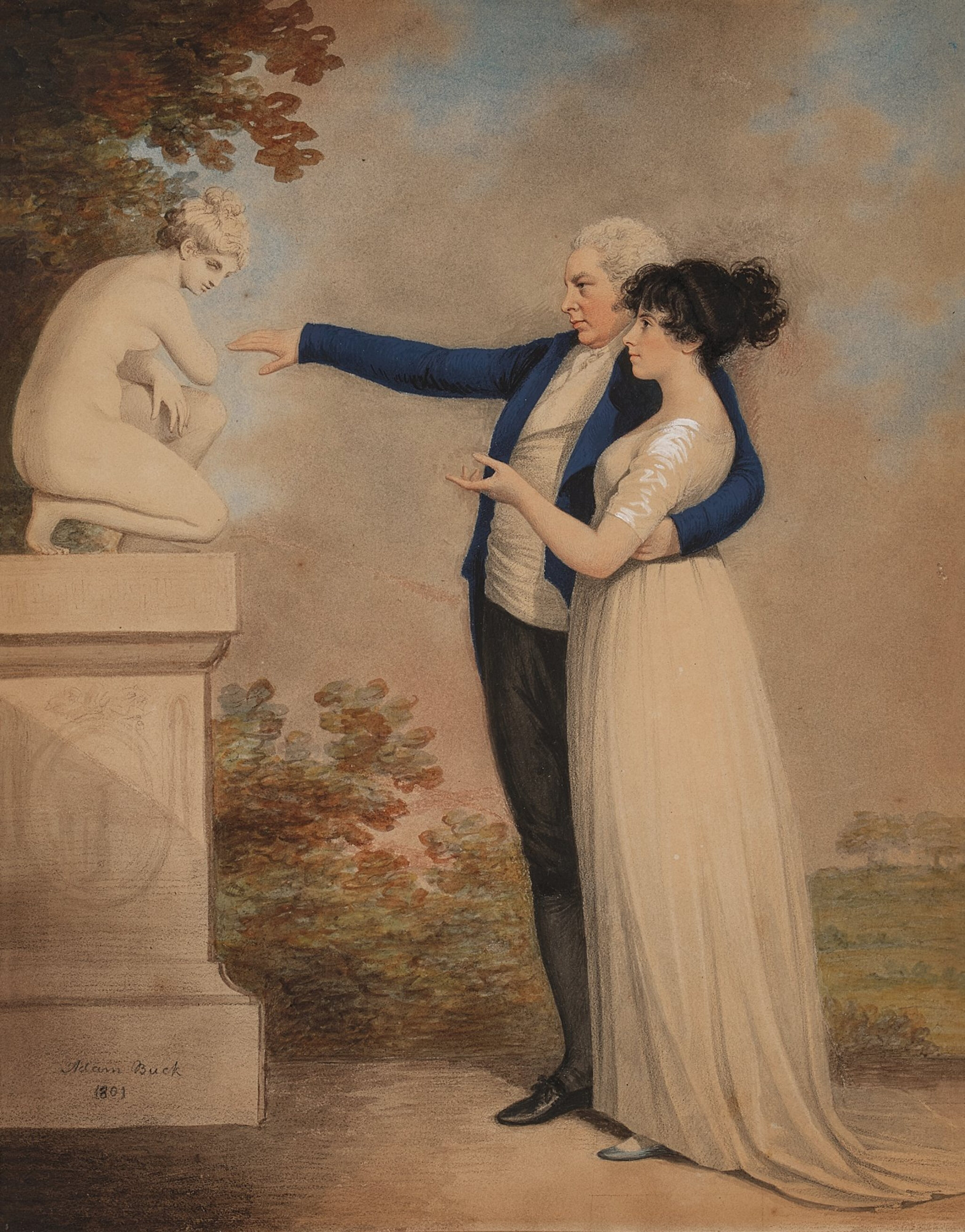
An Elegant Couple Admiring The 'Lely Venus', 1801

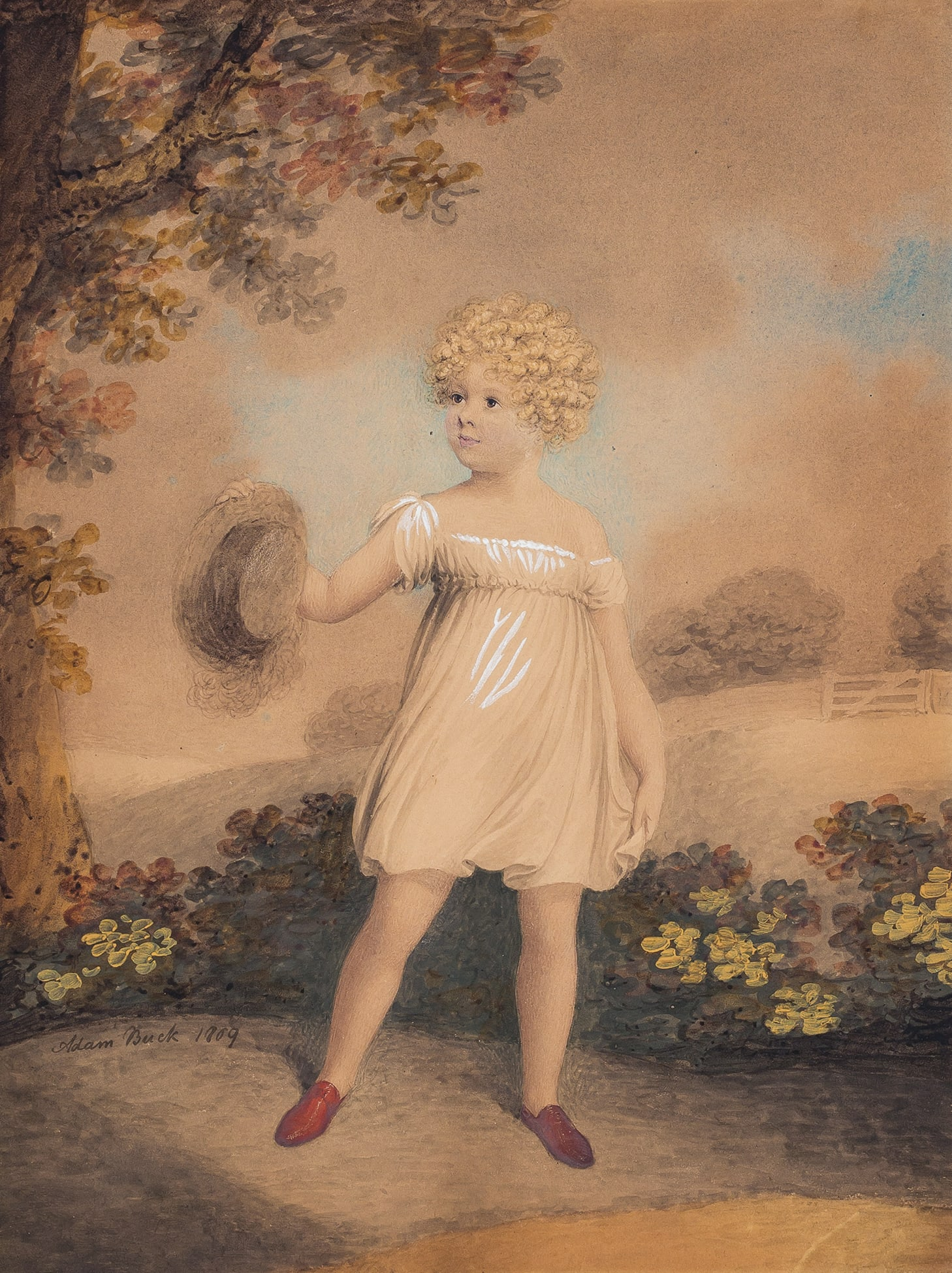
A Confident Child, 1809

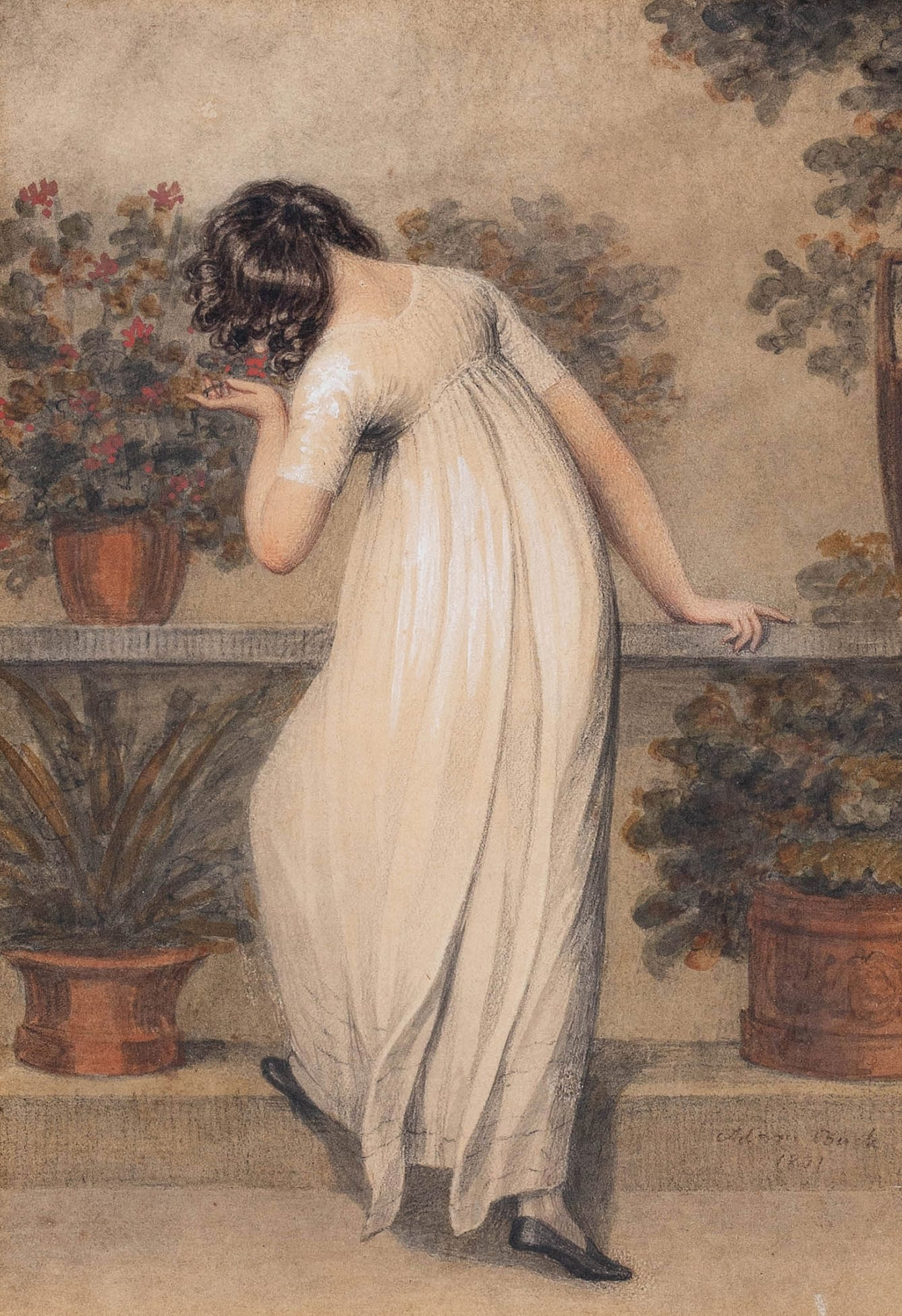
Exhibited: Colnaghi as ‘A Girl smelling Geraniums’. Girl on a terrace. (1807)

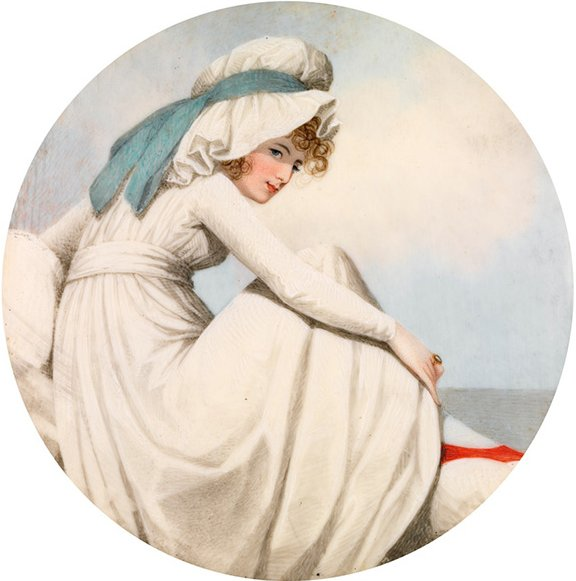
Portrait of a Young Lady Seated on a Sea-wall

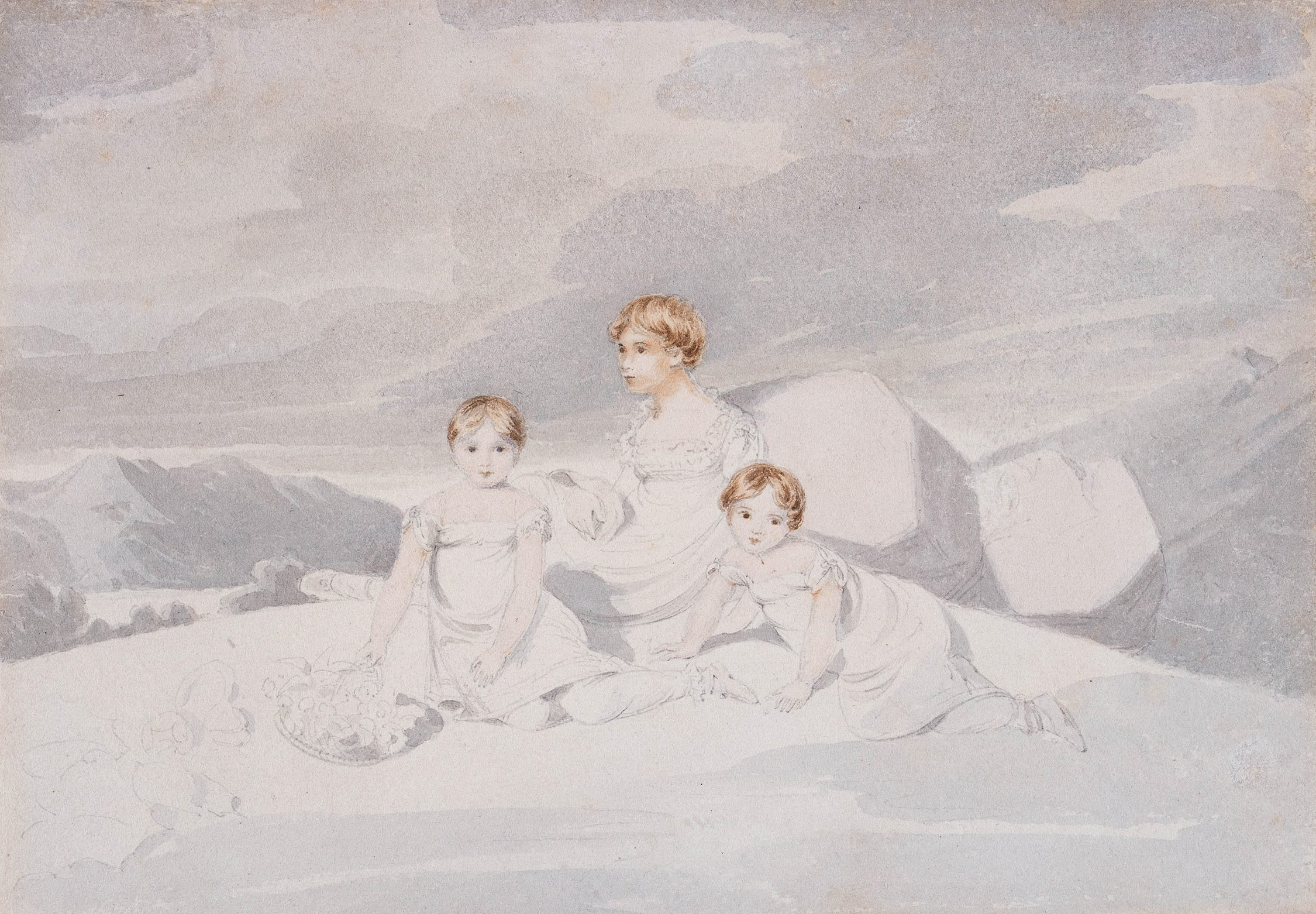
Exhibited: Agnews 94th Annual Exhibition of Watercolours and Drawings, 1957, No.17, as ‘Martha, Katherine and Isabel Butler’. Three small girls in a wild landscape. Pencil and watercolour. Indistinctly inscribed verso ‘(unclear name), Katharine and Isabella daughters of R.S(unclear). Previously believed to be three of the daughters of the Poet Robert Southey. (before 1834)

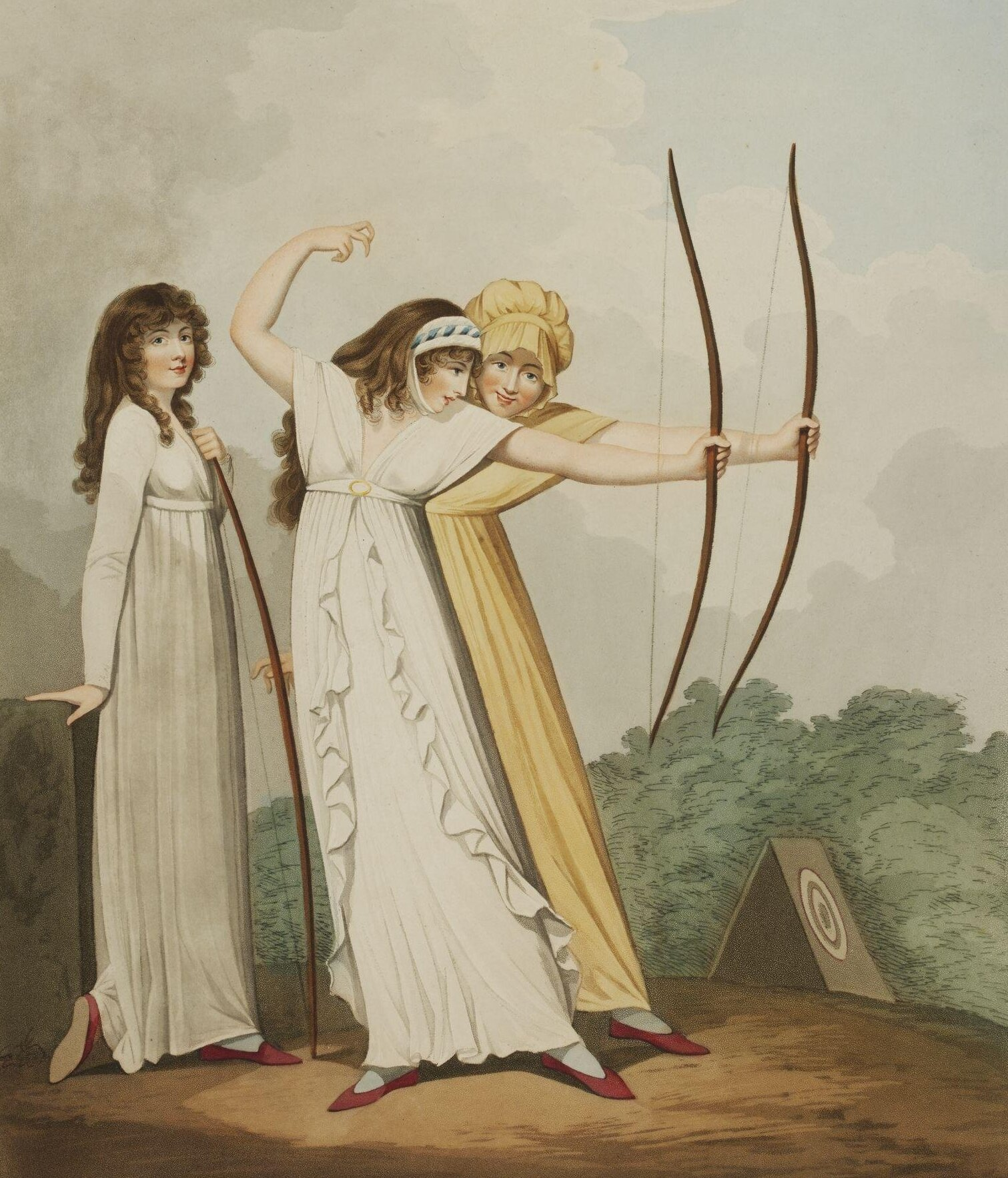
"Archers", print after Buck, 1799

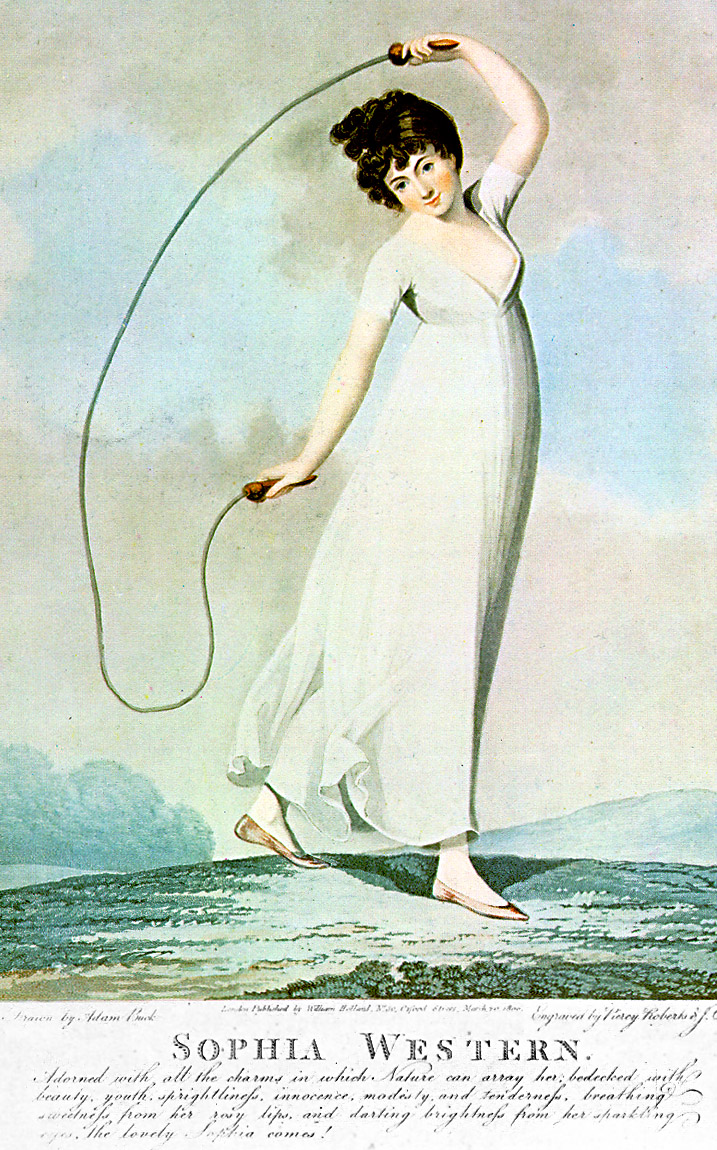
"Sophia Western", engraving after Buck, 1800
