= Crouching Venus =

Type of statue

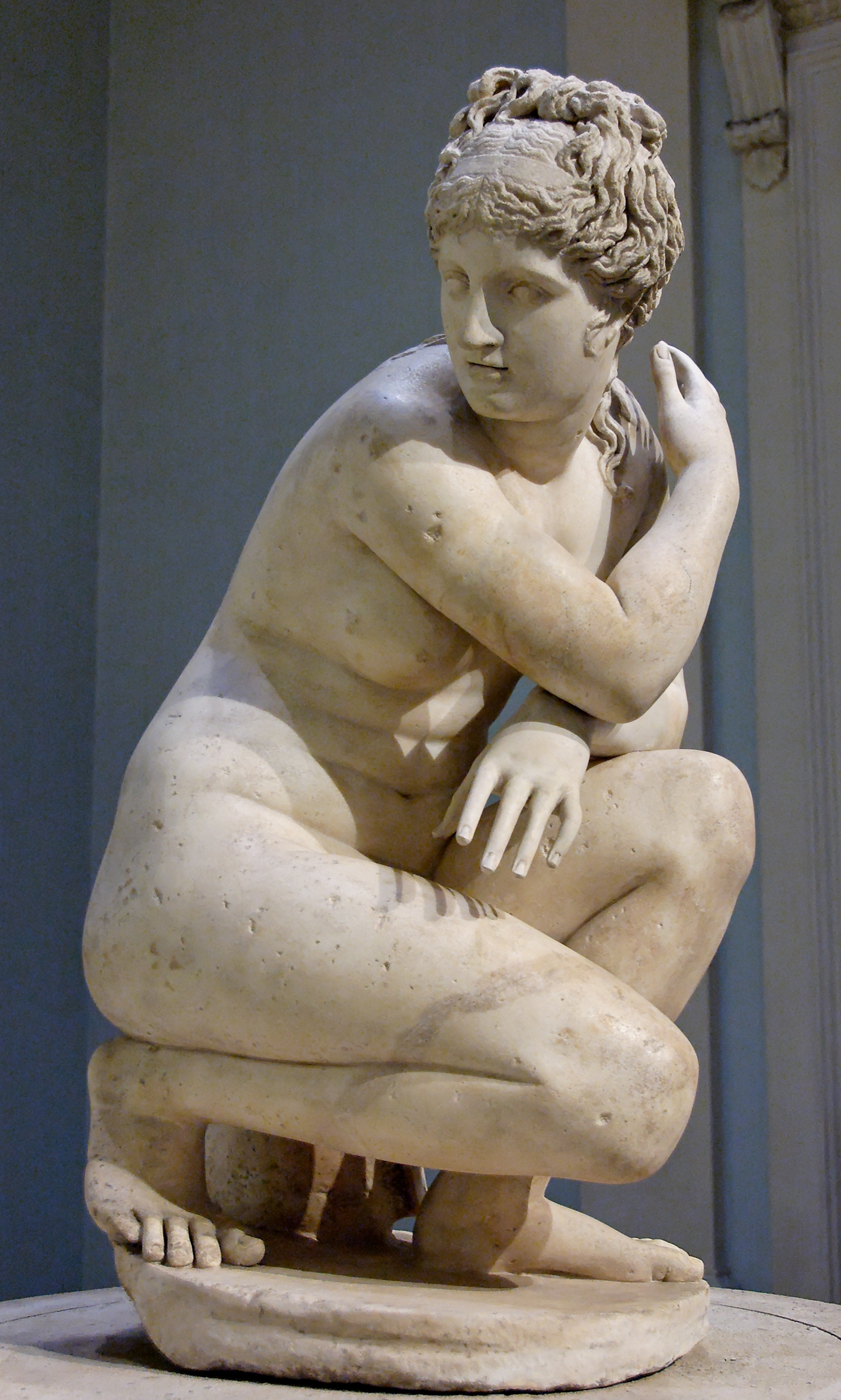
The Lely Venus once belonged to the painter Sir Peter Lely (Royal Collection, on loan to the British Museum

The Crouching Venus is a Hellenistic model of Venus surprised at her bath. Venus crouches with her right knee close to the ground, turns her head to the right and, in most versions, reaches her right arm over to her left shoulder to cover her breasts. To judge by the number of copies that have been excavated on Roman sites in Italy and France, this variant on Venus seems to have been popular.

A number of examples of the Crouching Venus in prominent collections have influenced modern sculptors since Giambologna and have been drawn by artists since Martin Heemskerck, who made a drawing of the Farnese Crouching Venus that is now in Naples.

== Attribution ==
The model is often related to a corrupt passage in Pliny the Elder's Natural History (xxxvi.4), enumerating sculptures in the Temple of Jupiter Stator in the Portico of Octavia, near the Roman Forum; the text has been emended to a mention of Venerem lavantem sese Daedalsas, stantem Polycharmus ("Venus washing herself, of Daedalsas, [and another], standing, of Polycharmus"), recording a sculpture of a Venus who was not standing, by the otherwise unknown Doidalses or Daedalsas.

== Ancient examples ==
Such terse archival references and so many existing ancient versions make archival identification of the Roman copies insecure, though some include a water jar and/or an additional figure of Eros which make identification easier (e.g. the Hermitage example, and here). The Crouching Venus was often paired with the other famous crouching sculpture of Antiquity, the Arrotino.

- The Crouching Venus of the Medici collection, noted at Villa Medici, Rome, is now at the Uffizi in Florence. It was engraved (with its restored sea-shell – see here) by Paolo Alessandro Maffei, Raccolta di statue antiche e moderni..., 1704 (plate XXVIII)
- The Crouching Venus of the Farnese collection of marbles, restored with a small Eros who engages the goddess's attention, is now in the Museo Archeologico Nazionale, Naples. It was drawn by Martin Heemskerck.
- The Crouching Venus of the Borghese collection, purchased in 1807 from Camillo Borghese, now in the Louvre. In the Borghese collection it had been freely restored as a Diana, holding her hunting bow in her right hand.

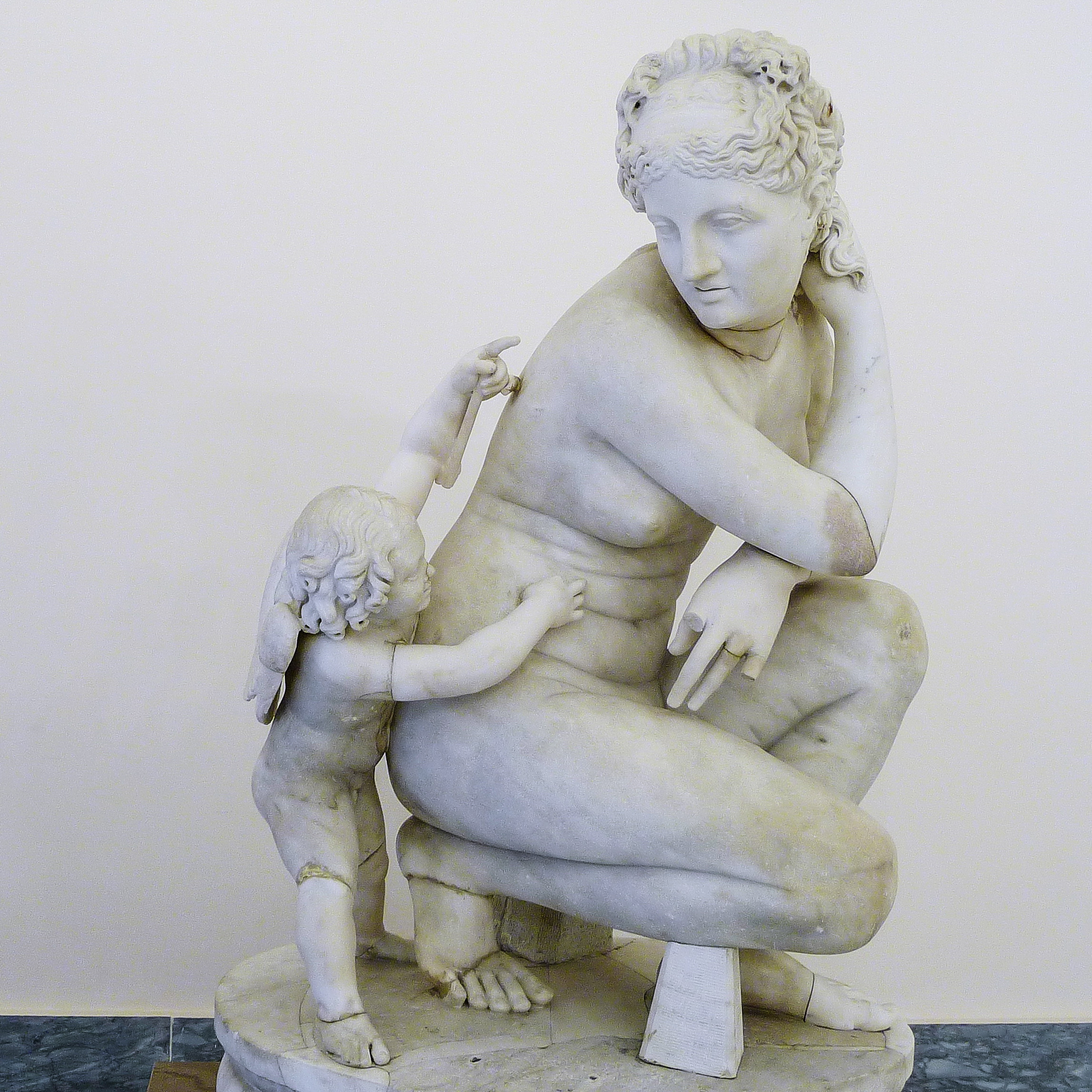
Crouching Venus and Cupid of the Farnese collection (Museo archeologico nazionale di Napoli)

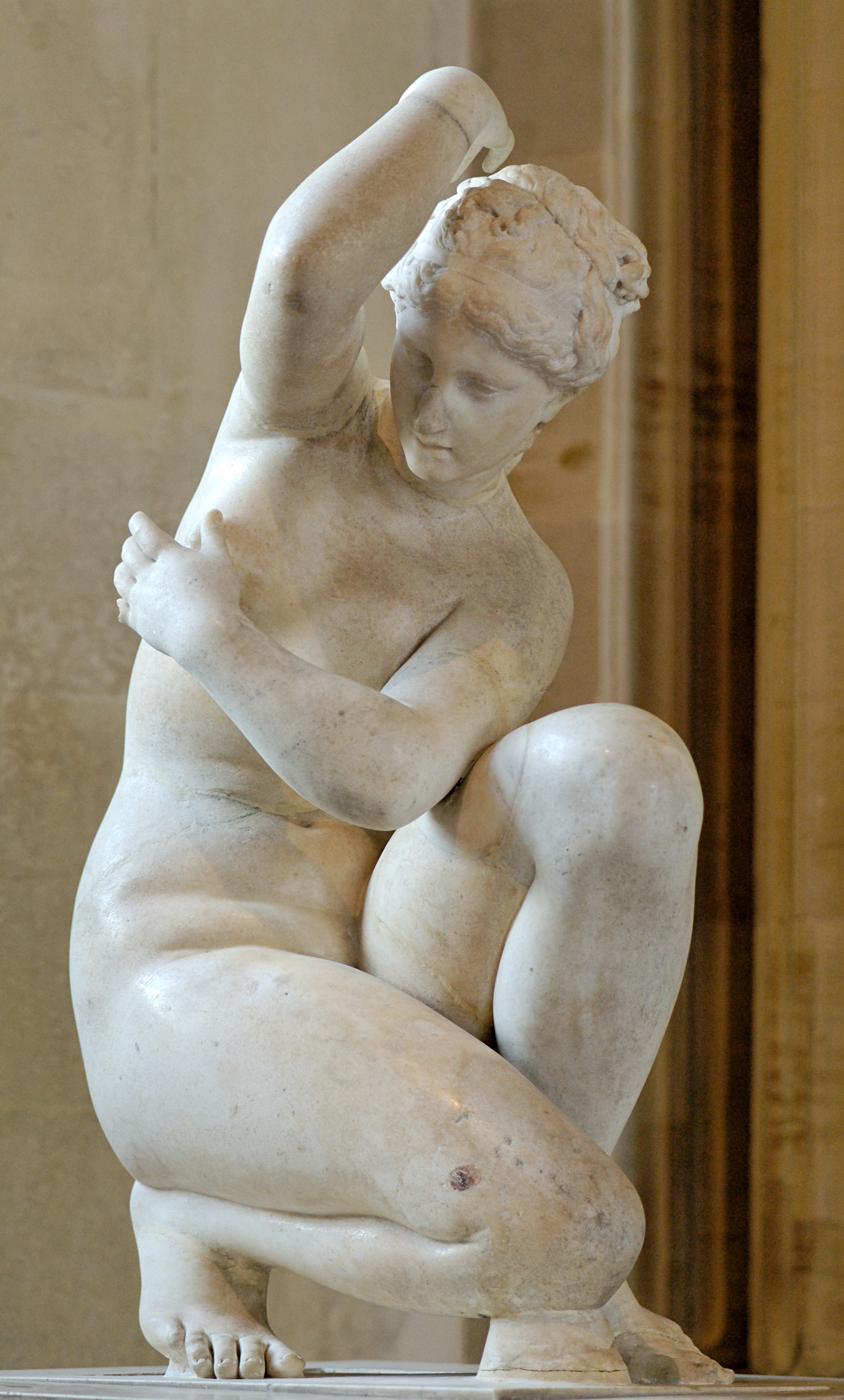
Vénus Accroupie (Musée du Louvre)

- The Lely Venus (main image, above) is an Antonine marble that was in the Gonzaga collection, Mantua, where it was inventoried in the Gonzaga collection in 1627 and was remarked in England in 1631 as "the finest statue of all" and valued at 6000 ecus. It was purchased in 1627–28 from the Gonzagas for Charles I of England, whose art collections were dispersed during the Commonwealth, when it was purchased by the painter and connoisseur Sir Peter Lely. It passed once again into the Royal Collection in 1682 and is on loan to the British Museum.
- The Crouching Venus excavated at Salona (modern Solin near Split, Croatia) in the second half of the 18th century was purchased for the Vatican Museums, where it was etched by Francesco, the son of Giovanni Battista Piranesi, then confiscated by the French under Napoleon but returned to the Vatican in 1816, where it remains.
- The Vénus Accroupie, is a 2nd-century crouching Venus from the collection of Louis XIV, now in the Musée du Louvre. In a variation, her right arm is raised behind her head.
- The Crouching Venus of Vienne, 1st or 2nd-century CE, considered one of the finest Roman marbles of this type, was excavated in 1828 at Sainte-Colombe, on the right bank of the Rhône, part of the ancient city of Vienne which lies across the river; it was purchased from the Gerantet collection in 1878 for the Louvre, where Cézanne drew it and adapted it for one of the figures in his Grande Baigneuses (Philadelphia). The remains of a small hand on her back show that this was one of the versions that included a little Eros
- A Crouching Venus that was excavated at that quarry of antiquities, Hadrian's Villa at Tivoli, in the 1920s, is accounted among the finest of the Roman versions (Haskell and Penny 1981:323). It is conserved in essentially unrestored condition in the Museo Nazionale delle Terme, Rome.
- A small marble Crouching Aphrodite of the 1st century BCE, discovered in Rhodes and conserved in the Rhodes Archaeological Museum, is a variant of the pose in which – instead of attempting to cover up modestly – Venus lifts her hair in her fingers to dry it, looks out at the viewer and openly displays her breasts. The type is sometimes distinguished as the Crouching Aphrodite of Rhodes.

Small ancient bronzes of the Crouching Venus have survived. One, found in Syria, and formerly in the collection of Joseph Durighello, was sold by the Galerie Georges Petit, Paris.

== Appreciation in the Renaissance ==
Crouching Venus engraved by Marcantonio Raimondi, 1505–06: which Roman marble furnished the model?

The early interpretation of the figure, as Venus at her birth, about to be carried ashore – a type of Venus Anadyomene – encouraged the restoration of a shell upon which she crouches, in which form the Medici sculpture was engraved by Paolo Alessandro Maffei, Raccolta di statue antiche e moderni..., 1704 (plate XXVIII)

=== Versions since the Renaissance ===
Several versions of the Crouching Venus issued from the atelier of Giambologna and his heir Antonio Susini; among examples of Susini's bronze reduction, one from the collection of Louis XIV is conserved in the Holburne Museum of Art, Bath, while another, in the collection of Prince Carl Eusebius von Liechtenstein by 1658, remains in the Liechtenstein collection, Vienna.

- A famous variant in marble was delivered by Antoine Coysevox in 1686 for the Château de Marly; Coysevox, who set his Venus on a tortoise rather than a shell, was so exultant in his success that he inscribed the name of Phidias in Greek as well as his own. The sculpture pleased the king to the extent that a bronze version was cast. Today the Marly marble is at the Musée du Louvre and the Marly bronze is at the Château de Versailles.
- A marble copy (1762) by Tommaso Solari was part of the garden statuary surrounding the Caserta Palace, near Naples (Haskell and Penny 1981:323).
- Jean-Baptiste Carpeaux's Crouching Flora (ca 1873), in the Museu Calouste Gulbenkian, Lisbon, reinterprets the familiar pose.

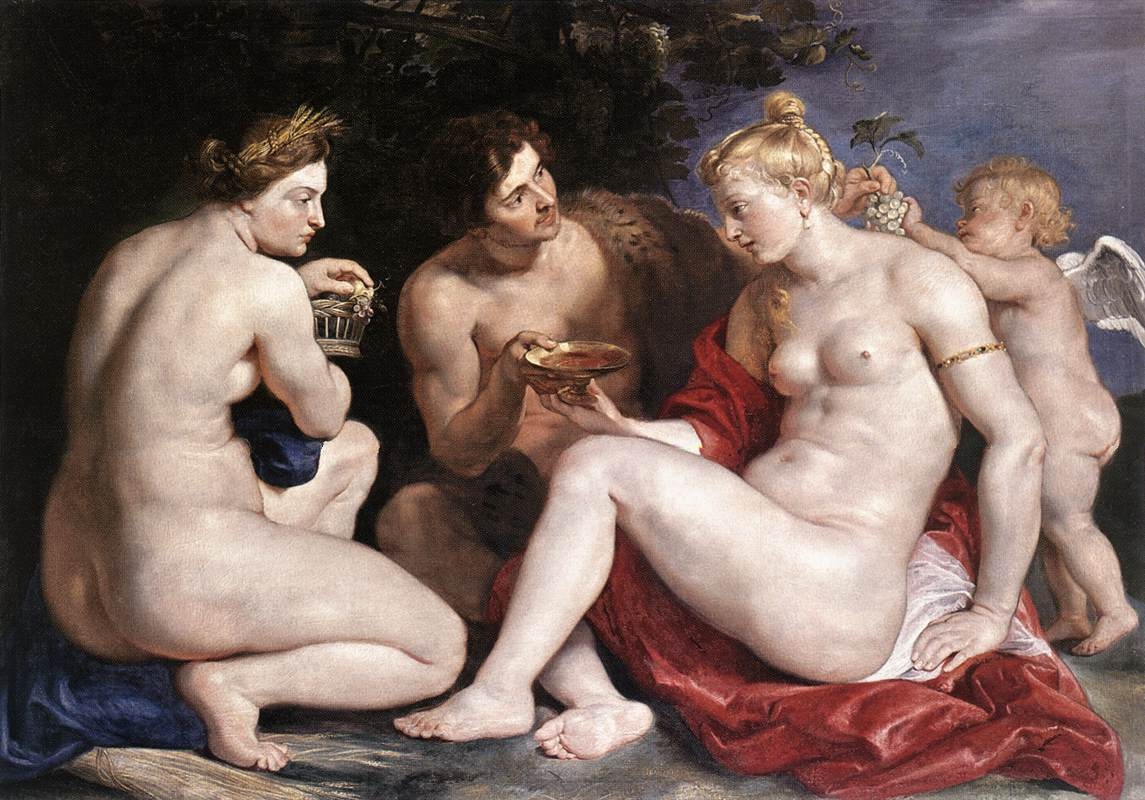
Allegory by Peter Paul Rubens, 1612–13, executed after his stay with the Gonzaga at Mantua, where he saw the Lely Crouching Venus, then in the Gonzaga collection
