= The Birth of Venus (disambiguation) =

The Birth of Venus is a 15th-century painting by Sandro Botticelli.

The Birth of Venus may also refer to:

== Visual arts ==
- Venus Anadyomene, one of the iconic representations of the goddess Venus
- The Birth of Venus (Boucher), 1754
- The Birth of Venus (Bouguereau), 1879
- The Birth of Venus (Cabanel), 1863
- The Birth of Venus (Fragonard), c. 1753
- The Birth of Venus (Gérôme), or Venus Rising (The Star), 1890
- The Birth of Venus (Gervex), 1907
- The Birth of Venus (Poussin), or Triumph of Neptune and Amphitrite, c.1695
- The Birth of Venus, by Eugène Emmanuel Amaury Duval, 1862

== Other uses ==
- The Birth of Venus (novel), by Sarah Dunant, 2003
- La Naissance de Vénus, an 1892 composition by Gabriel Fauré

== See also ==
- Aphrodite § Birth
- Venus (mythology)
- Venus Anadyomene (Titian)
- Venus Anadyomene (Ingres)
