= Kerdeston Hawking Book =

The Kerdeston Hawking Book is an illuminated manuscript dating from the 15th century, containing information about medieval falconry practices.

== History ==
=== Composition ===
The Kerdeson Hawking Book was produced for Sir Thomas Kerdeston in the 1430s by a scribe in East Anglia.

=== Acquisition by the British Library ===
As part of the UK government's Acceptance in Lieu scheme, the book was acquired by the British Library in 2007 in place of inheritance tax. A few surviving leaves of the Kerdeston Hunting Book were accepted simultaneously. These were both placed into the library's extensive collection of Middle English manuscripts.

== Contents ==
The Book contains six texts on falconry, two of which have not survived in any other form. Topics discussed in these texts include the training of hawks and falcons for hunting, and the treatment of their illnesses. Illuminations, produced in a workshop in Suffolk, accompany the text.
