= Polyphemus (Sebastiano del Piombo) =

Fresco by Sebastiano del Piombo

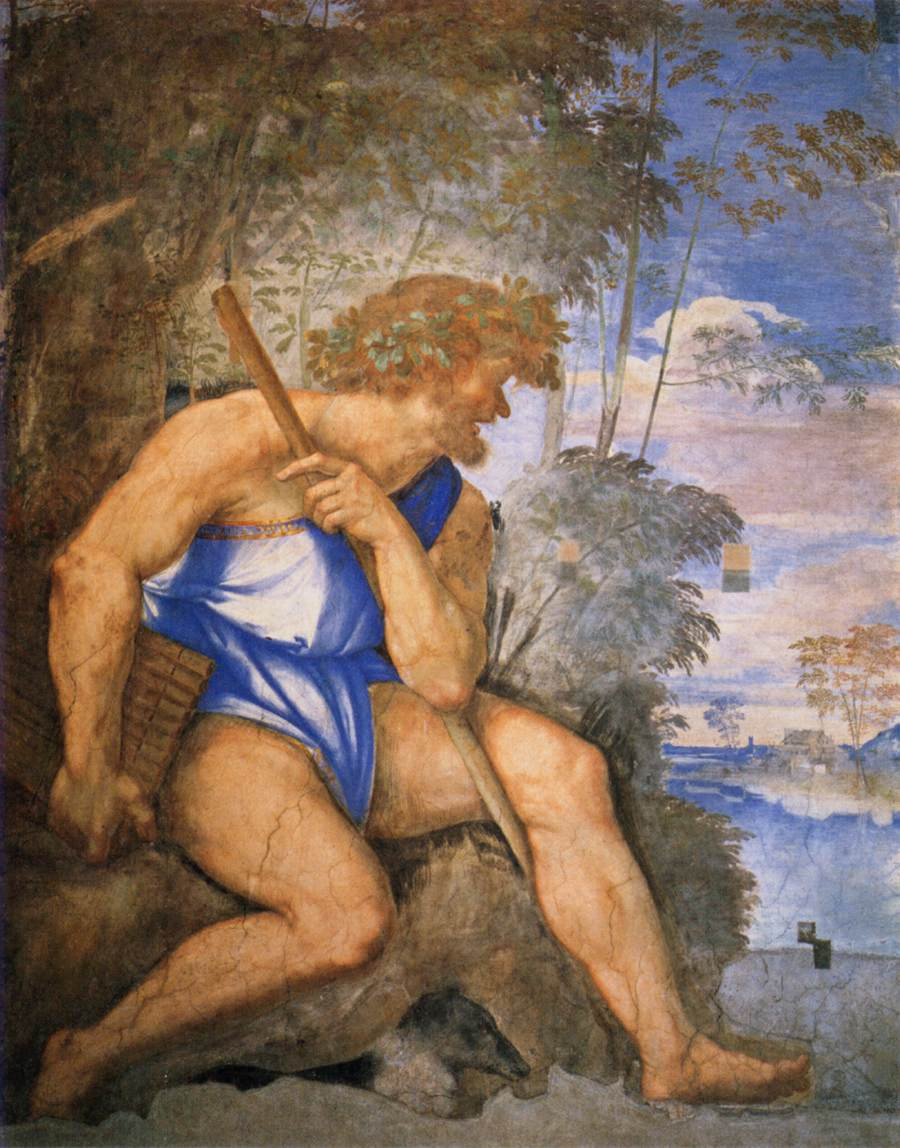
Polyphemus (c. 1512) by Sebastiano del Piombo

Polyphemus is a circa 1512 fresco by Sebastiano del Piombo in the Villa Chigi, next to Raphael's Triumph of Galatea and continuing its iconography.
