= Venus Anadyomene (Ingres) =

Painting by Jean-Auguste-Dominique Ingres

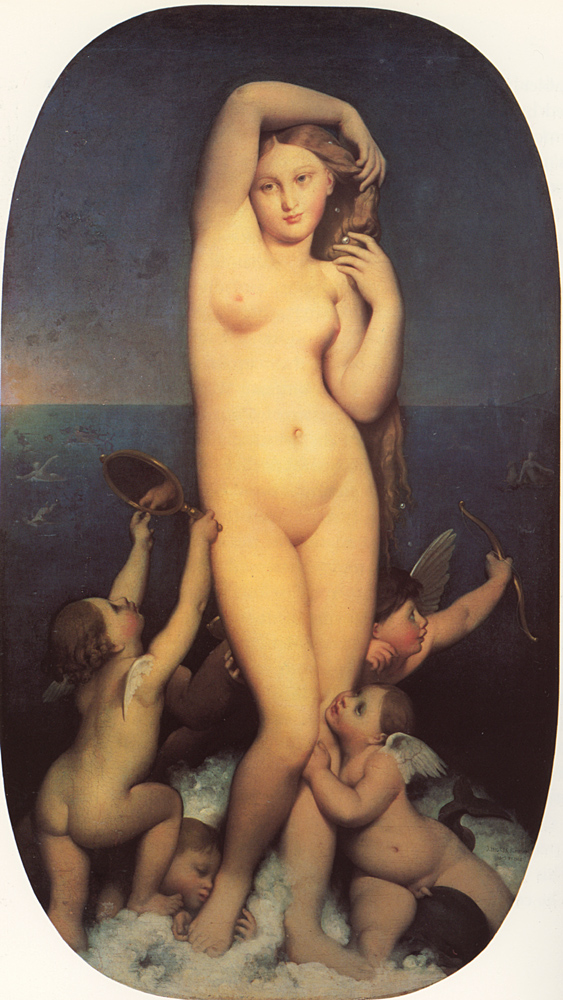
- Artist: Jean-Auguste-Dominique Ingres
- Year: 1807-1848
- Medium: Oil painting
- Dimensions: 163 cm × 92 cm (64 in × 36 in)
- Location: Musée Condé, Château de Chantilly, Chantilly
- Accession: PE 433
- Website: www.musee-conde.fr/r/ba5491af-07e9-45df-adcf-8b3f237de0ee

Venus Anadyomene is a painting by the French painter Jean-Auguste-Dominique Ingres. It is now held at the Musée Condé, Chantilly, France. It is a female nude of the Venus Anadyomene type, showing the goddess Venus rising from the sea.

== History ==
Ingres began the painting in 1808 during his stay in Rome at the French Academy. The first preparatory drawings showed Venus in the Venus Pudica position, standing and covering her breasts with her hands. The pose was inspired by Botticelli's The Birth of Venus – Ingres visited Florence and the Uffizi in 1805 and could have seen the painting there. A drawing of 1806 then shows the goddess with her arms in the air and her hair in her hands, a pose the artist also used in his 1856 The Source.

The painting remained in the planning stages until 1848, when he completed it as a commission from the banker and botanist Benjamin Delessert. This involved major changes to the colour scheme Ingres had originally planned for the painting. However, in the end Delessert declined the painting since he felt the knee was drawn awkwardly. Later in 1848 the painting was sold to Frédéric Reiset, curator of drawings at the Louvre Museum. It was exhibited at the 1855 Exposition Universelle in Paris, where it was seen by the poet Charles Baudelaire. Baudelaire argued that the head was inspired by classical sculpture, the hands by Raphael, and the narrow torso by medieval sculpture. (Note: "La tête est inspirée des modèles antiques, les mains de Raphaël et le torse étroit de la statuaire médiévale.")

In 1879 this painting and the rest of the Reiset collection were bought by Henri d'Orléans, Duke of Aumale. It was closely followed by later treatments of the subject, such as Théodore Chassériau's Vénus marine and Bouguereau's 1879 The Birth of Venus. A smaller copy of the painting from c.1825–1850 is in the Louvre and the preparatory drawings are now in the Ingres Museum in Montauban.
