= Giovanni Martini da Udine =

Giovanni Martini
- Born: 1470/75; Udine
- Died: September 30, 1535; Udine

Giovanni Martini or Giovanni Martini da Udine (1470/75 – September 30, 1535) was an Italian painter and sculptor of the Renaissance, born in Udine between 1470 and 1475. With Pellegrino da San Daniele he is one of the main representatives of Renaissance art in the Friuli region of north-east Italy.

== Biography ==
A member of a family of artists, Giovanni was the son of Martin and the grandson of Domenico da Tolmezzo.

For many years, he was identified as the painter, also from Udine, who signed John the Baptist and worked in Udine and in the Friuli, between the end of the 15th and early 16th century. Currently these works are attributed to Giovanni Battista da Udine, a follower of Alvise Vivarini.

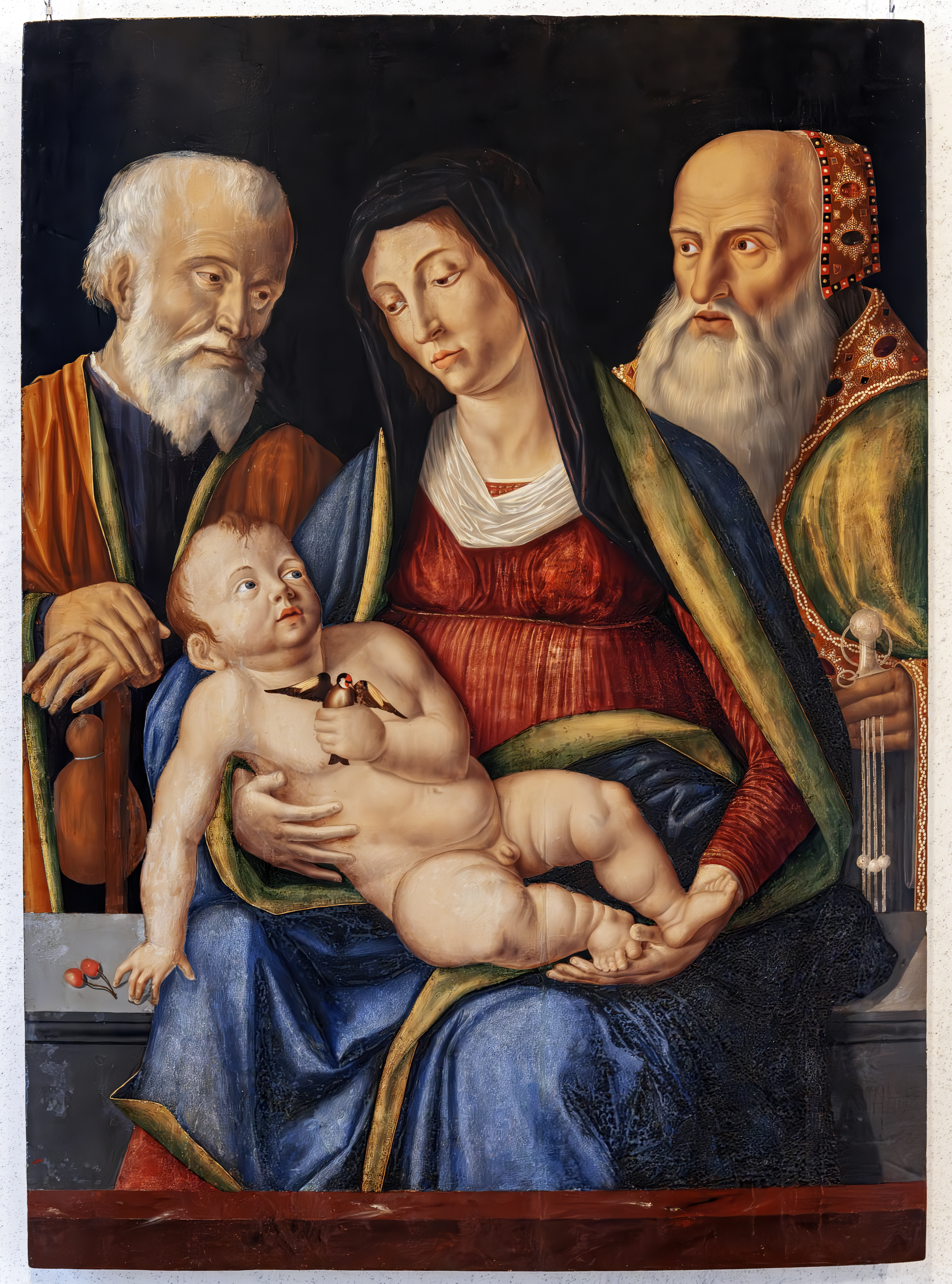
Madonna with Child Saint Joseph and Saint Simeon- Correr Museum Venice

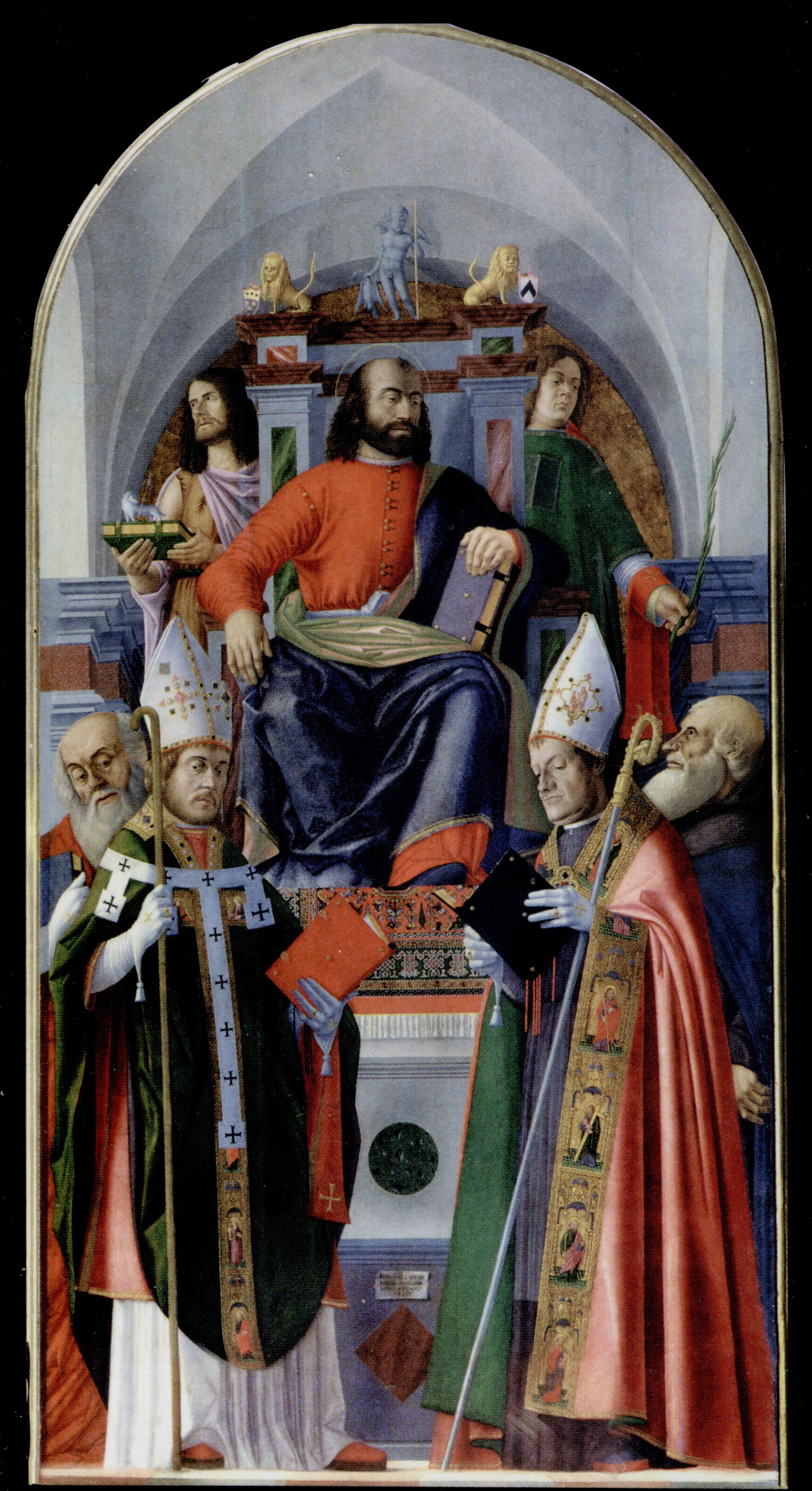
St Mark and Saints, 1501 Chapel of St Mark, Udine Cathedral

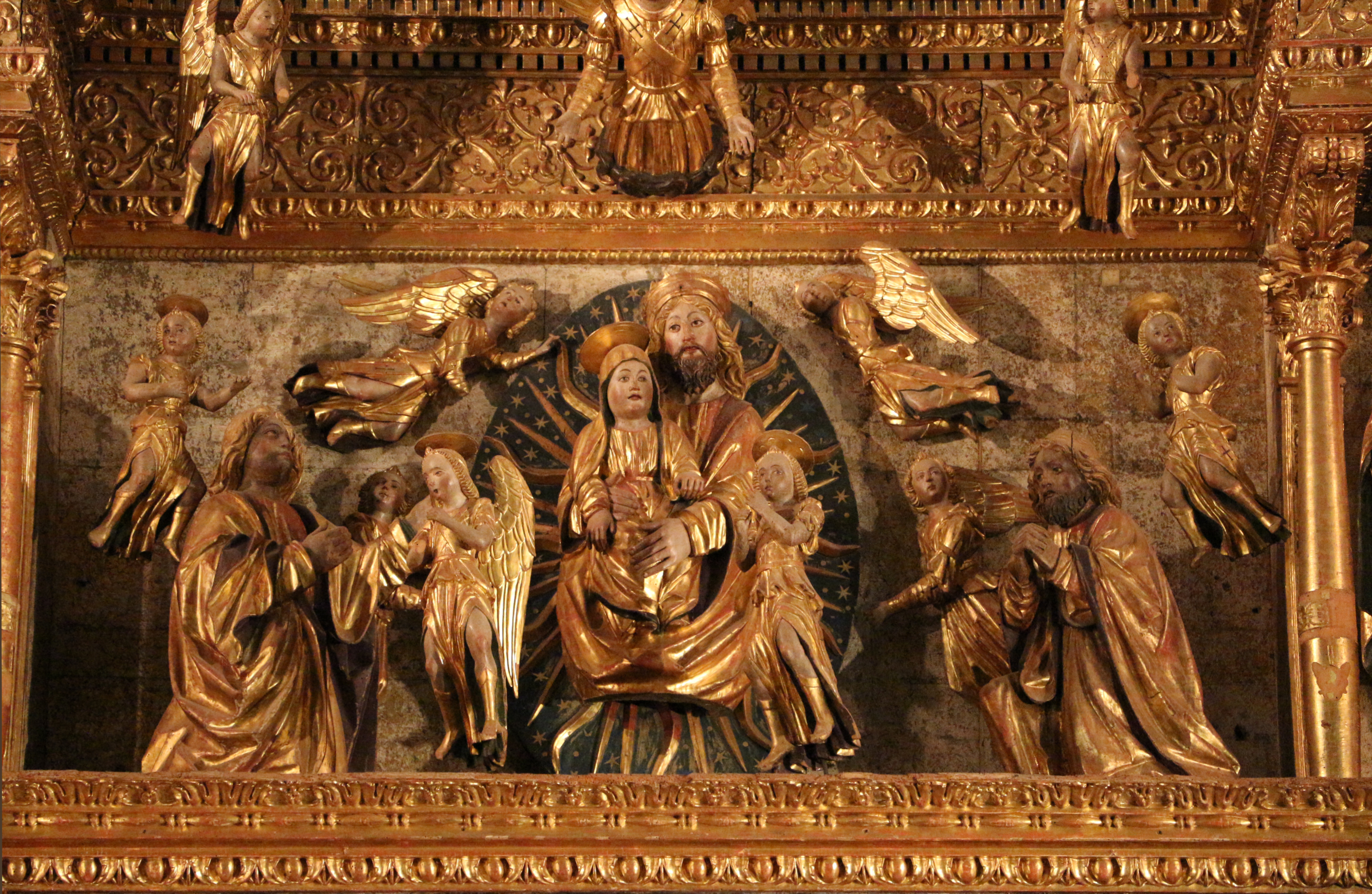
Dormitio Virginis - detail from the Mortegliano altarpiece

Giovanni Martini's first signed work, in 1501, is the altarpiece St. Mark and St. John the Baptist, with Saints Stephen, Jerome, Ermacore, Abbot Anthony, and the Blessed Bertrand, located in the Chapel of St. Mark in Udine Cathedral. This work was highly criticized by Giacomo Gordino, the dean of the chapter of the cathedral, in a letter to Domenico Grimani, Patriarch of Aquileia, complaining of the martial aspect given to St. Mark by the painter, which may be a portrait of Antonio Loredan, lieutenant of Friuli. Another altarpiece, the St. Ursula Altarpiece, dated 1507 on its back, was created for the Saint Peter Martyr church in Udine. These two altarpieces demonstrate Martini's knowledge of the works of Alvise Vivarini and Cima da Conegliano, and are connected with the traditions of Friuli.

In 1507 he inherited his father and uncle's workshop and took on the tradition of carved wooden altars, adapting the traditional Gothic style of Friuli to the fashion of the Venetian Renaissance. He completed a wooden altar in 1515 for the church of Santa Maria delle Grazie in Prodolone (in San Vito al Tagliamento). The rhythm of the composition of the statues of this set shows a still strong link with the tradition of the school of Tolmezzo in the Quattrocento.

The most representative of Martini's wooden altars is that in Mortegliano, which he completed in 1526. For this impressive work he was paid the enormous sum for the time of 1180 ducats. The altar, which stands more than five meters high and is the largest in Friuli, consists of 60 statues. It is divided into registers and subdivided into individual cells, as previously, but it has a spatial continuity through the columns of the architectural framework, as can be seen for example linking the Pietà group and the Dormitio Virginis. It is regarded not only as the artist's masterpiece, but also as one of the highest expressions of wooden sculpture of the Renaissance.

Other examples can be found in the parish churches of Faedis and Remanzacco.

Udine also painted over 170 plants, including both Old World and New World species, at the Villa Farnesina. These paintings include the first generally recognised depictions in Europe of Zea Mays (maize, corn) and Cucurbita maxima (squash), as well as some of the first depictions in Europe of Cucurbita pepo and possibly Cucurbita moschata. Another remarkable feature in these paintings is a "well-known phallic representation of an elongated gourd penetrating a fig".

== Works ==
Martini's principal mature painted works are

- Holy Family with Simeon (1498), oil on panel, 96 x 71 cm, Museo Correr, Venice
- St. Mark and St. John the Baptist, Stephen, Jerome, Ermacora, Abbot Anthony and the blessed Bertrand (1501), Udine Cathedral
- Altarpiece of Saint Ursula (1507), created for the church of San Pietro Martire Udinese in Udine, now divided between the Pinacoteca di Brera in Milan (central panel), the Civic Museums of Udine (upper part), and a private collection;
- Presentation in the Temple (1515), Portogruaro Cathedral (Duomo di Sant'Andrea apostolo);
- Altarpiece of Santa Maria in Collevillano (1522), created for the church of the same name at Faedis, now lost;
- Presentation in the Temple (1530), Spilimbergo Cathedral.
