= The Birth of Venus (Gervex) =

Painting by Henri Gervex

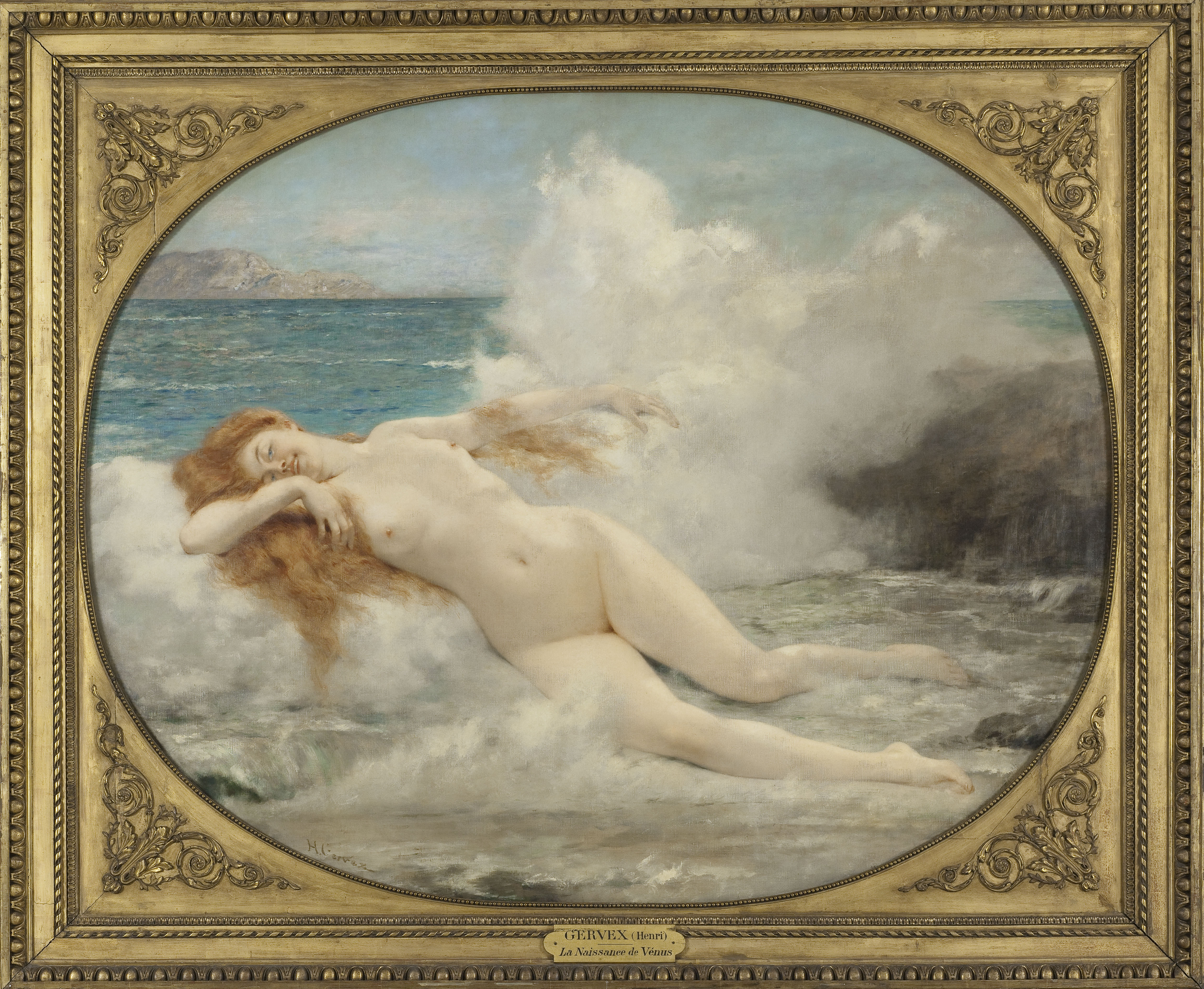
The Birth of Venus (1907) by Henri Gervex

The Birth of Venus is a 1907 painting by the French artist Henri Gervex. It is now in the Petit Palais, in Paris. It depicts the Greek goddess Venus (Aphrodite) washed up to shore after her birth, when she had emerged from the sea fully-grown (called Venus Anadyomene and often depicted in art).
