= Venus Anadyomene (Titian) =

Painting by Titian

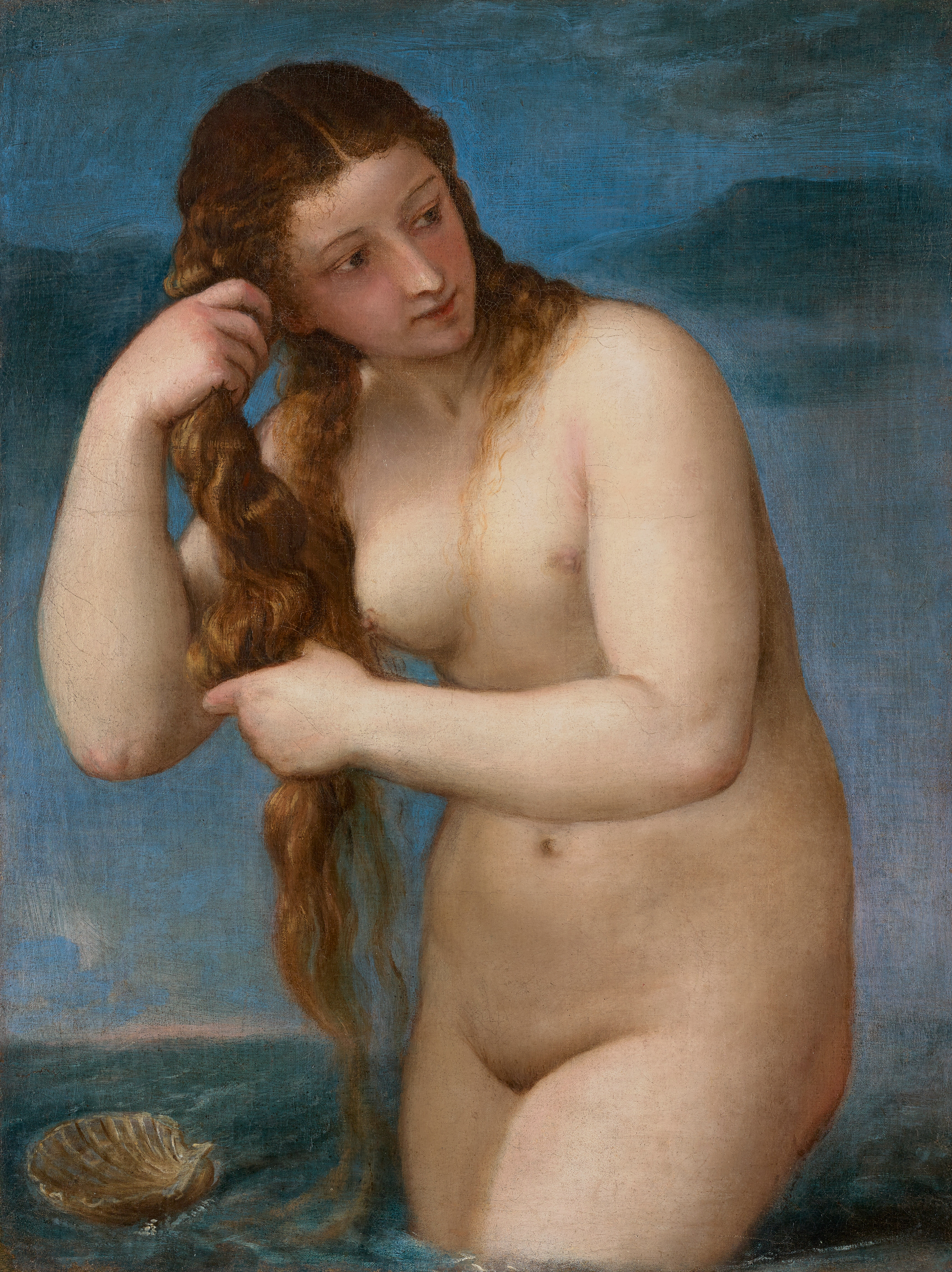
- Artist: Titian
- Year: c. 1520
- Medium: Oil on canvas
- Dimensions: 75.8 cm × 57.6 cm (29.8 in × 22.7 in)
- Location: Scottish National Gallery, Edinburgh

Venus Anadyomene is an oil painting by Titian, dating to around 1520. It depicts Venus rising from the sea and wringing her hair, with a shell visible at the bottom left, taken from a description of Venus by Greek poet Hesiod in which she was born fully-grown from a shell. The shell is smaller than usual in scenes of the birth of Venus, such as Botticelli's, and is just intended to identify the subject rather than be a boat-like vessel for Venus, as in Sandro Botticelli's The Birth of Venus and other depictions.

The voluptuousness of the Venus presented, and her sideways glance, also owes much to the Crouching Venus and Cnidian Venus types of antique sculpture. The wringing of her hair is a direct imitation of Apelles's lost masterwork of the same title. Titian deliberately included this detail to prove that he could rival the art of antiquity in which the goddess was also washing her hair—a fact mentioned in Pliny's Natural History.

The painting is in good condition and achieved public ownership in 2003 when it was purchased from Francis Egerton, 7th Duke of Sutherland. It was once owned by Christina of Sweden, and passed via the Orleans Collection to John Egerton, 6th Duke of Sutherland, who lent it and 26 other paintings to the National Gallery of Scotland in 1945. On the death of the childless Duke in 2000, the work was acquired from his cousin, Francis Egerton, 7th Duke of Sutherland, for more than £11m in 2003, with the aid of the National Art Collections Fund. Also contributing to the purchase were the Wolfson Foundation, the Heritage Lottery Fund (£7.6m), and the Scottish Executive (£2.5m). To facilitate the sale, £2.4m of the picture's value was offset against inheritance tax. The market value has been estimated at £20m. After the sale, the 7th Duke said, "To all intents and purposes nothing has changed, except the painting will now belong to the nation."

It soon afterwards formed the centrepiece of an exhibition in 2004 and the anniversary exhibition "Saved!" for the National Art Collections Fund.

== See also ==
- List of works by Titian
- Venus Anadyomene
- The Birth of Venus (disambiguation)
