= Venus Anadyomene =

One of the iconic representations of Aphrodite

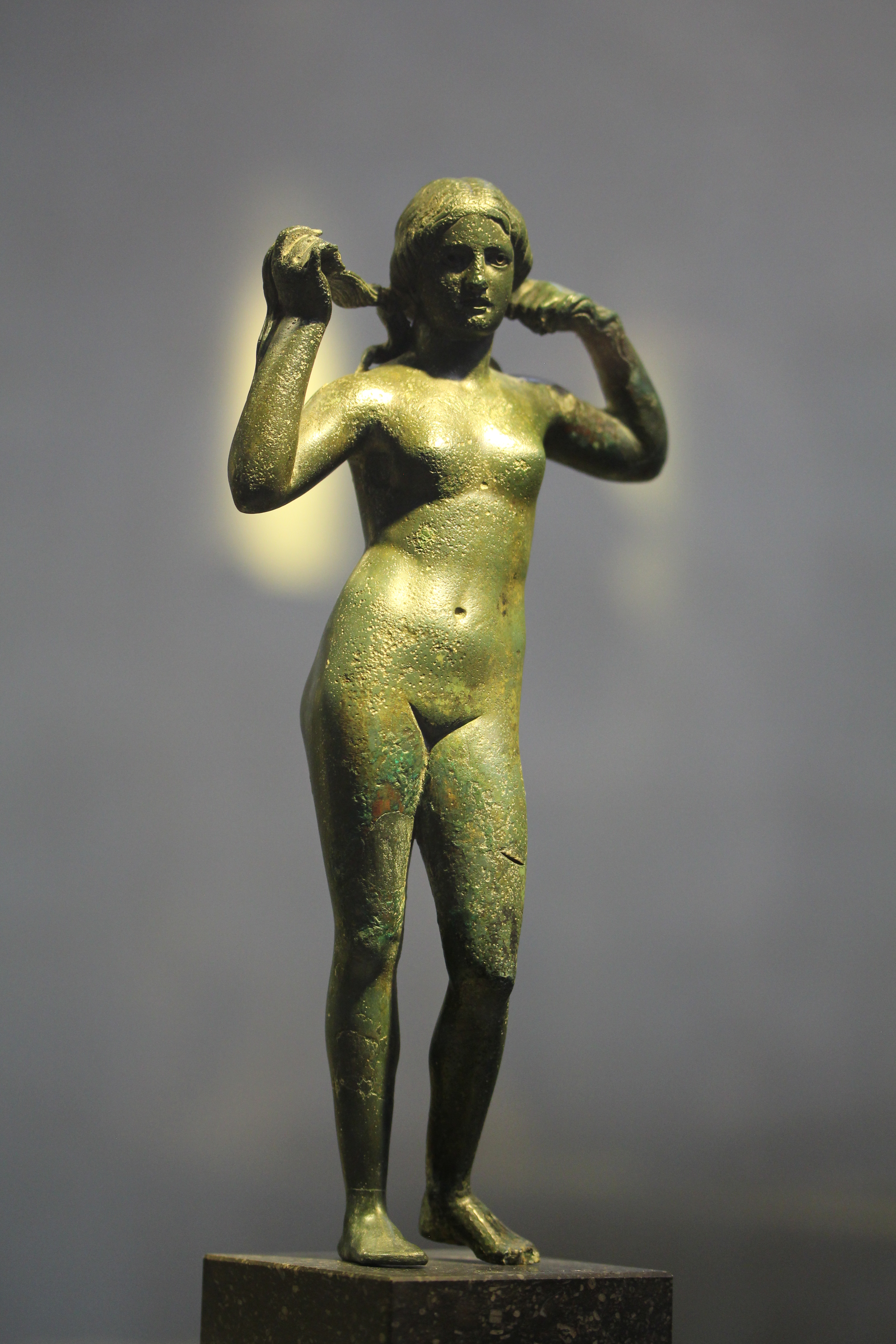
A bronze statue of Venus Anadyomene made in the 1st or 2nd century. Venus is shown wringing out her hair. The statue was discovered in Kortrijk and is now in the collection of the Musée royal de Mariemont.

Venus Anadyomene (Greek: Ἀναδυομένη, romanized: Anadyoménê, lit. 'rising from the sea', Ancient Greek pronunciation: [a.na.dy.o'me.nεː]) is one of the iconic representations of the goddess Venus (Aphrodite), made famous in a much-admired painting by Apelles, now lost, but described in Pliny's Natural History, with the anecdote that the great Apelles employed Campaspe, a mistress of Alexander the Great, for his model. According to Athenaeus, the idea of Aphrodite rising from the sea was inspired by the courtesan Phryne, who, during the time of the festivals of the Eleusinia and Poseidonia, often swam nude in the sea. A scallop shell, often found in Venus Anadyomenes, is a symbol of the female vulva.

The subject never entirely disappeared in Western art, and revived greatly in the Italian Renaissance, with further boosts in the Baroque and Rococo, and in late 19th-century Academic painting. At least one central female nude is practically required in the subject, which has contributed to its popularity.

== Antiquity ==
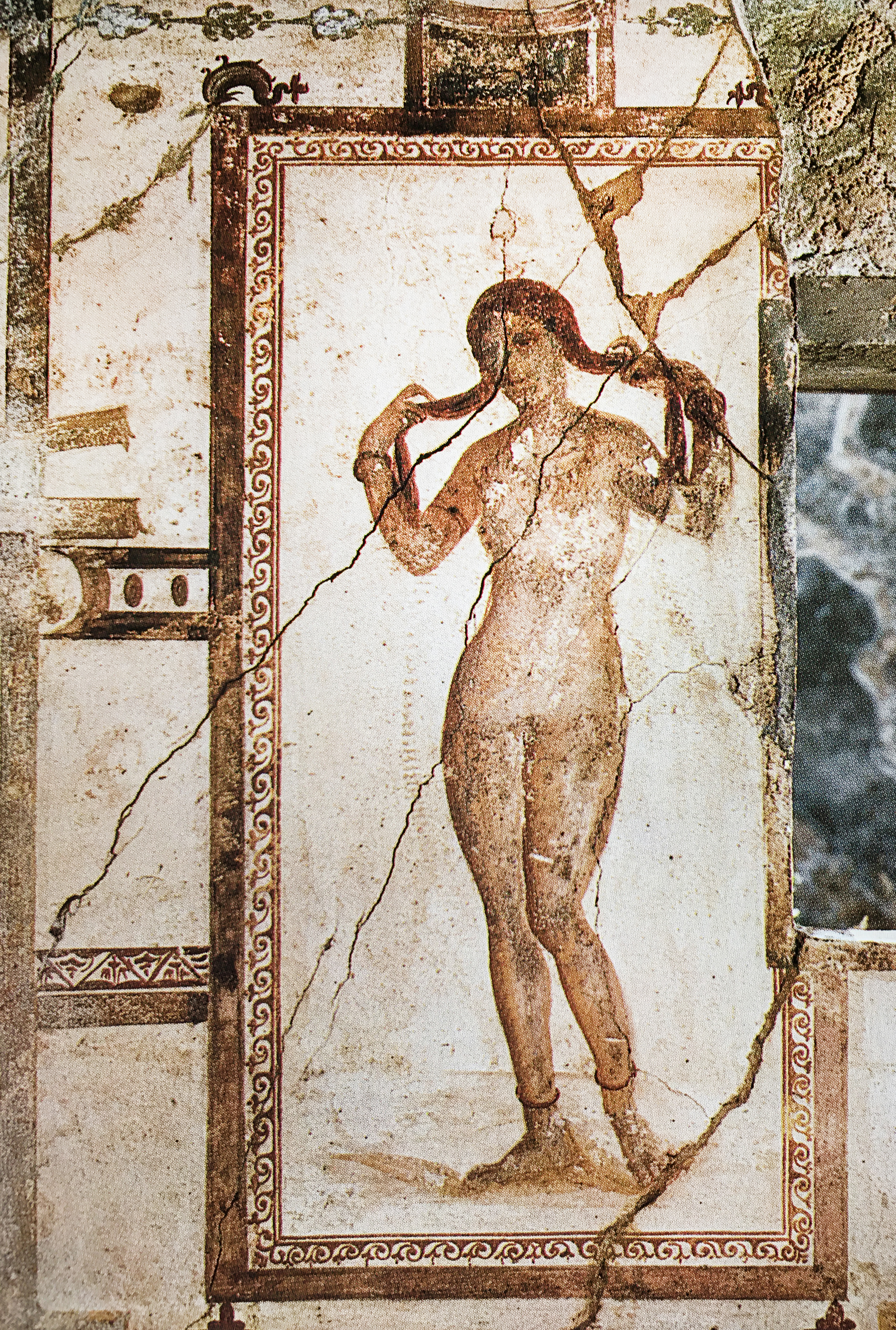
A mural of Venus Anadyomene, with the goddess wringing her hair, from the Casa del Principe di Napoli in Pompeii

According to Greek mythology, Aphrodite was born as an adult woman from the sea off Paphos in Cyprus, which also perpetually renewed her virginity. A motif of the goddess wringing out her hair is often repeated. The subject was often repeated in Antiquity, a fourth-century sculptural representation from a Gallo-Roman villa in Aquitania (Louvre) testifying to the motif's continued viability in Late Antiquity.

Apelles' painting was executed for the temple of Asclepius at Kos, from which it was taken to Rome by Augustus in part payment of tribute, and set up in the Temple of Caesar. In the time of Nero, owing to its dilapidated condition, it was replaced by a copy made by the painter Dorotheus. Pliny, listing Apelles' best paintings, noted "[Another of] Venus emerging from the sea, dedicated by the late Augustus of blessed memory in the shrine of Caesar his [adoptive-]father, which is called 'The Anadyomene', praised in Greek verses like other works, conquered by time but undimmed in fame."

The image of Venus Anadyomene is one of the very few images that survived in Western Europe, essentially unchanged from its classical appearance, from Antiquity into the High Middle Ages. Jean Seznec instances two images of Venus among constellations illustrating 14th-century Provençal manuscripts of Matfre Ermengau of Béziers' Breviari d'amor, in which Venus is represented nude in the sea: "This extraordinary conservatism may perhaps be explained by the fact that the culture of the last pagan centuries remained alive longer in Provence than elsewhere."

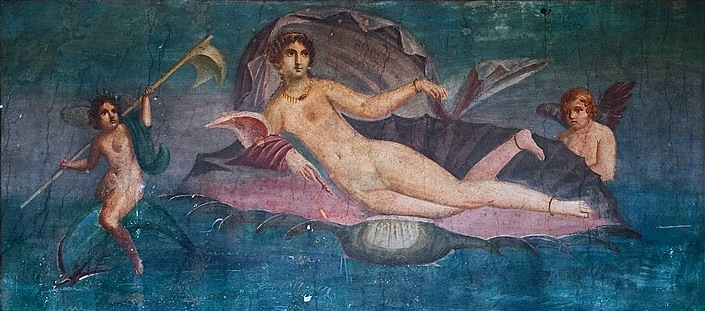
Venus rising from the sea, a wall painting from Pompeii

== Renaissance onwards ==
Sandro Botticelli, Uffizi Gallery, Florence 1484–1486

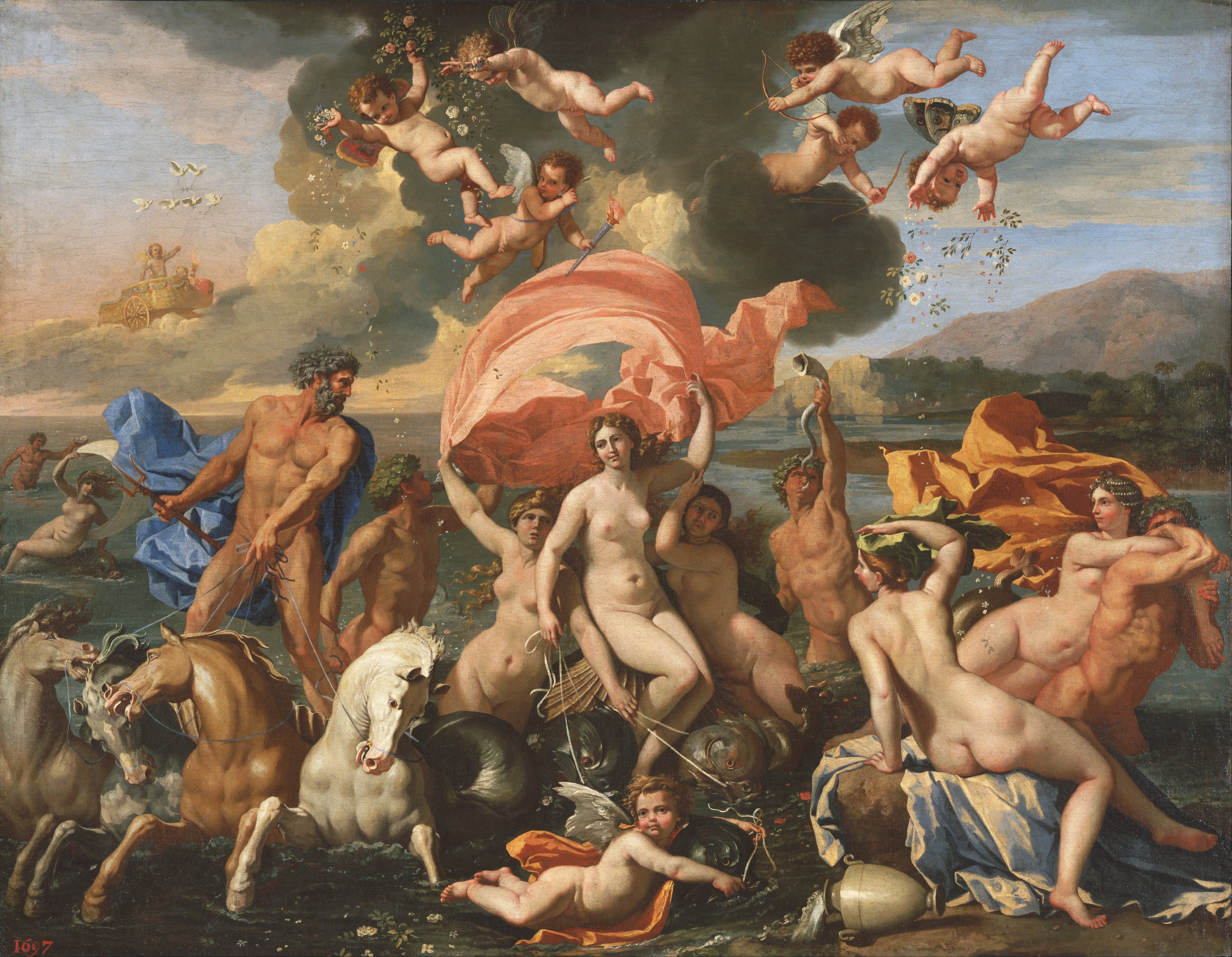
Nicolas Poussin, 1635–36, Philadelphia

Through the desire of Renaissance artists reading Pliny to emulate Apelles, and if possible, to outdo him, Venus Anadyomene was taken up again in the 15th century: besides Botticelli's famous The Birth of Venus (Uffizi Gallery, Florence), another early Venus Anadyomene is the bas-relief by Antonio Lombardo from Wilton House (Victoria and Albert Museum).

Titian's Venus Anadyomene, c. 1520, formerly a long-term loan by the Duke of Sutherland, was bought by the National Gallery of Scotland in 2003. It depicts Venus standing in the sea, wringing out her hair. The scallop shell is merely symbolic, as it does not interact with Venus. Giambologna's sculpture is also a single figure wringing out her hair.

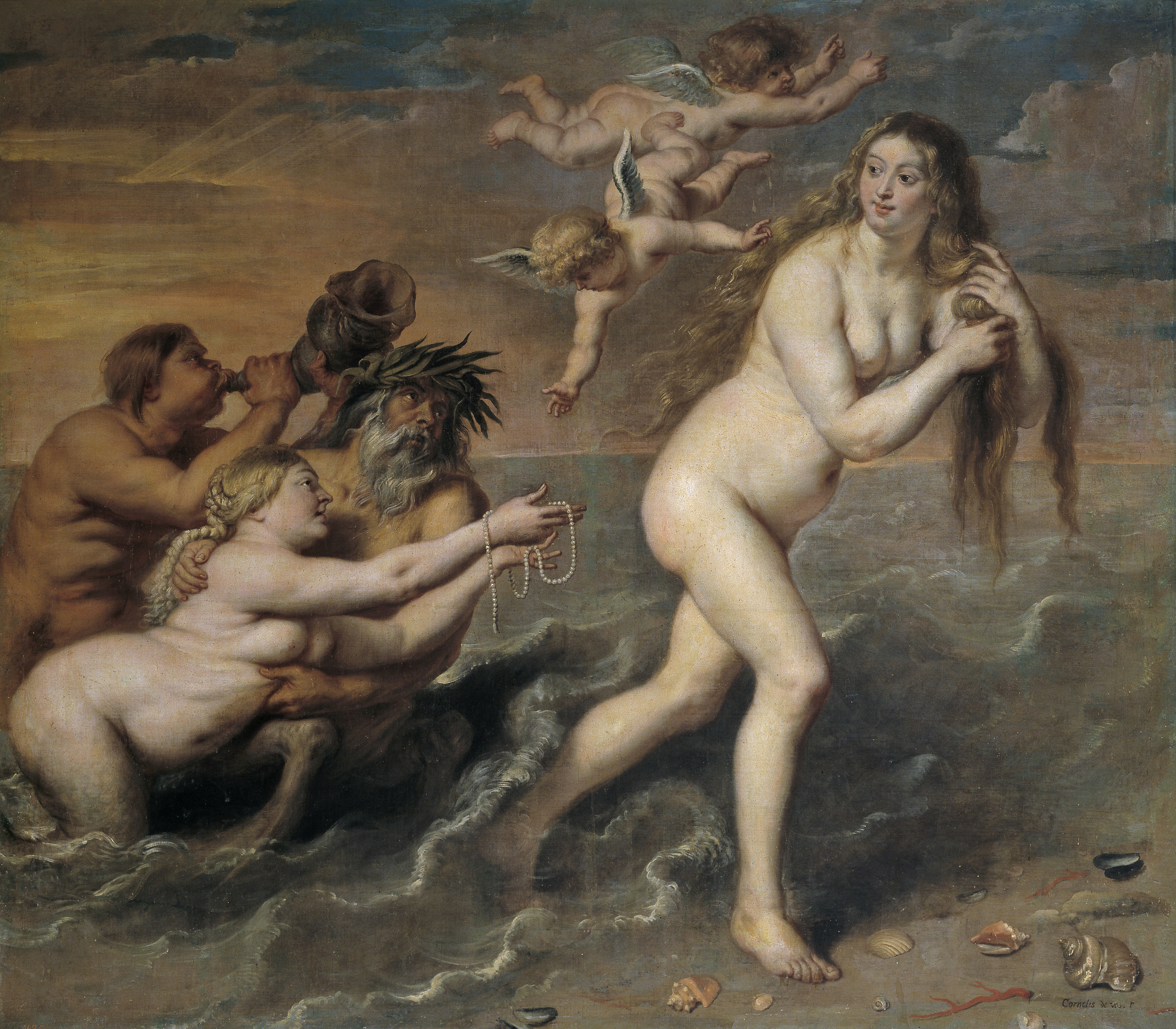
Cornelis de Vos, Prado, before 1651

The subject was popular with Baroque and Rococo painters, who made up large groups with attending cherubs, sea-nymphs, sea-horses, and tritons around the goddess; these might also be called a Triumph of Venus, and can be traced back to Raphael's Galatea (c. 1514). This, rather than the Botticelli, was the dominant influence on paintings of the subject until the late 19th century. Paintings in this vein include those by Nicolas Poussin (1635–36, Philadelphia), Sebastiano Ricci (c. 1713, Getty Museum), Pierre-Jacques Cazes, François Boucher (1740, Stockholm, and c. 1743 Hermitage Museum). A Cornelis de Vos in the Prado has an original and less formal composition.

Rococo sculptures of the subject were modestly draped across the hips, but bolder nudes appealed to male nineteenth-century patrons. Théodore Chassériau executed the subject in 1835; he repeated the hair-wringing gesture in his most famous work The Toilette of Esther (1841). Ingres' Venus Anadyomene, completed after many years in 1848, is one of the painter's most celebrated works (Musée Condé).

Alexandre Cabanel's The Birth of Venus, reworking the then recently discovered Pompeii fresco, was shown at the Paris Salon in 1863, and bought by Napoleon III for his own personal collection. Venus lies naked on the waves ambiguously, with putti flying above her. Robert Rosenblum's comment on Cabanel's painting is that "This Venus hovers somewhere between an ancient deity and a modern dream... and the ambiguity of her eyes, that seem to be closed but that a close look reveals that she is awake... A nude who could be asleep or awake is specially formidable for a male viewer".

Such a highly conventionalized theme, with undertones of eroticism justified by its mythological context, was ripe for modernist deconstruction; in 1870 Arthur Rimbaud evoked the image of a portly Clara Venus ("famous Venus") with all-too-human blemishes (déficits) in a sardonic poem that introduced cellulite to high literature: La graisse sous la peau paraît en feuilles plates ("the fat under the skin appears in slabs").

The Birth of Venus, by William-Adolphe Bouguereau (1879), reimagines the composition of the Raphael and Poussin tradition, reflecting the subject's continuing popularity among the academic painters of the late 19th century. It was shown at the Paris Salon of 1879, and was bought for the Musée du Luxembourg. Venus' nude figure takes up the center of the composition, with many admirers gathered around her.

Pablo Picasso recast the image of Venus Anadyomene in the central figure of his seminal painting Les Demoiselles d'Avignon (1907), a modernist deconstruction of the icon, and one of the foundational artworks of Cubism.

Venus Anadyomene offered a natural subject for a fountain: the National Gallery of Art, Washington D.C., has a lifesize bronze plumbed so that water drips from Venus's hair, modelled by a close follower of Giambologna, late sixteenth century.

== The voyage of the sable Venus from Angola to the West Indies ==
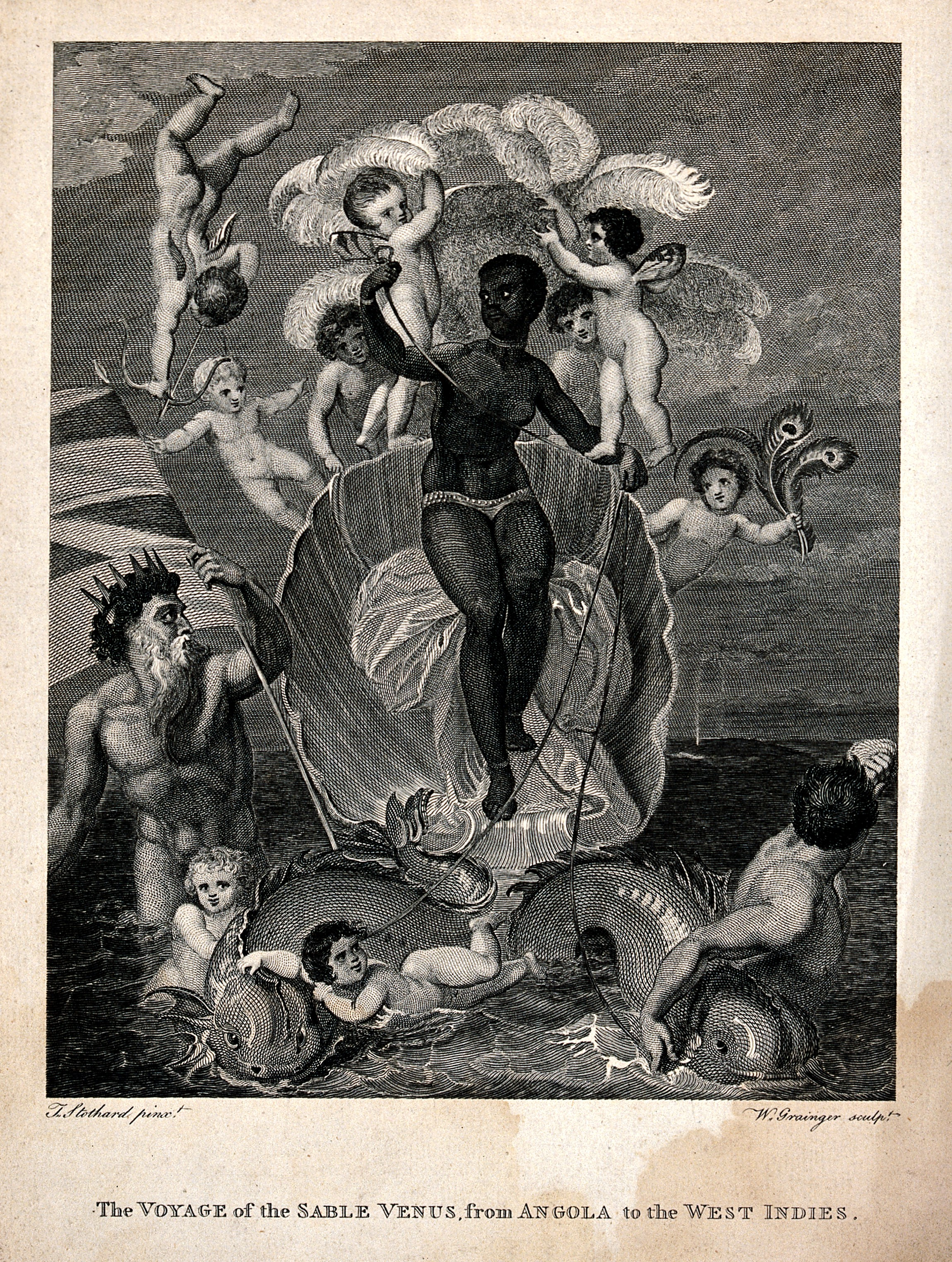
The voyage of the sable Venus from Angola to the West Indies

In 1793, Thomas Stothard created an etching inspired by Raphael or by Baroque compositions for the third edition of Bryan Edwards' The History, civil and Commercial of the British colonies in the West Indies. The voyage of the Sable Venus, from Angola to the West Indies depicts an African woman in the role of Venus. Attended by eight cherubs fanning her with feathers either of ostrich or of peacock, she holds the reins of a pair of dolphins who draw onward to the Americas the half-shell on which she stands. Cupid is displayed in the scene taking aim at a depiction of Neptune on the left waving a British flag. To the right is shown Triton looking back to the Sable Venus and embracing one of the dolphins. The figure is one of feminine strength: muscular, lean and adorned by a jewel necklace.

== Wave theory ==
In 1913 the British archaeologist John Myres was on the coast near Paphos in winter. Watching the sea, he saw the wind blow two breakers together.

When the angle of impact is about 90°, ‘the “break” is both concentrated within a small width of swell, and very violent, so that the breaker shoots up in a column like a water-spout, 10–15 feet high, and falls back in an outward cascade of foam which may be carried some feet to leeward by the wind. It looks exactly like a human figure literally “rising from the sea” and spreading long hair and dripping arms.

== Gallery ==
Later examples of representations of Venus Anadyomene

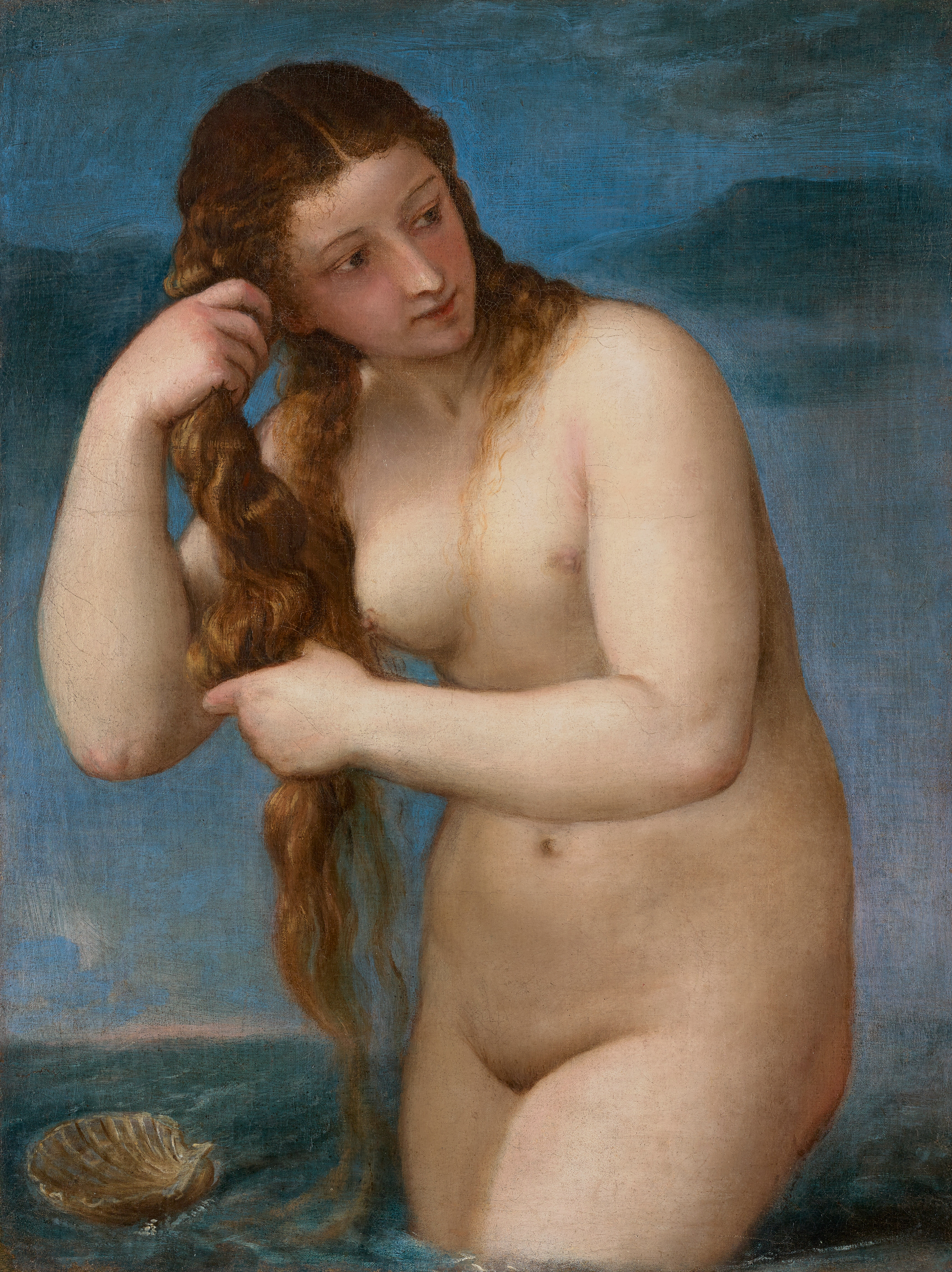
Venus Anadyomene, by Titian, c. 1520 (Scottish National Gallery).

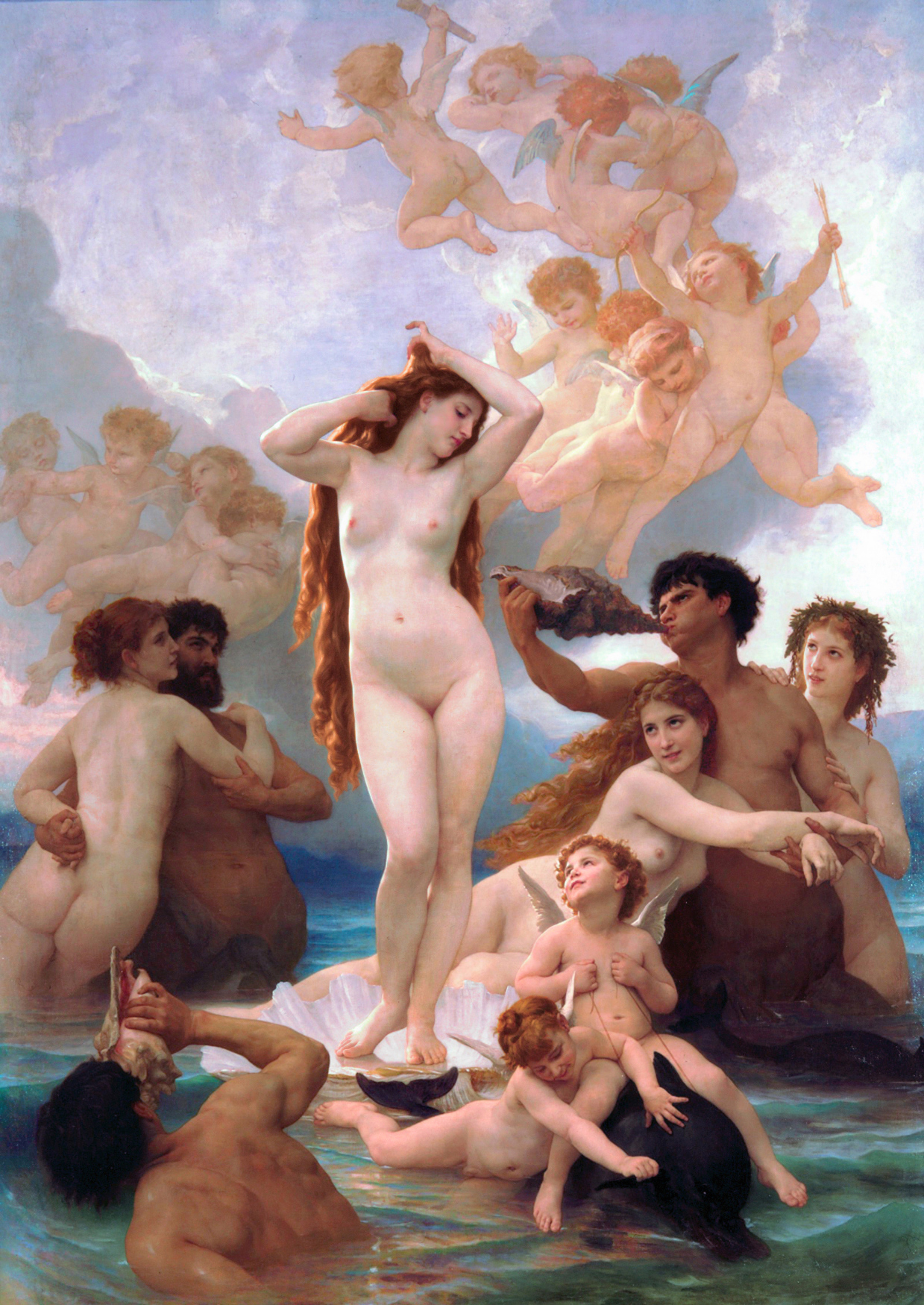
The Birth of Venus, by William-Adolphe Bouguereau, c. 1879 (Musée d'Orsay, Paris).

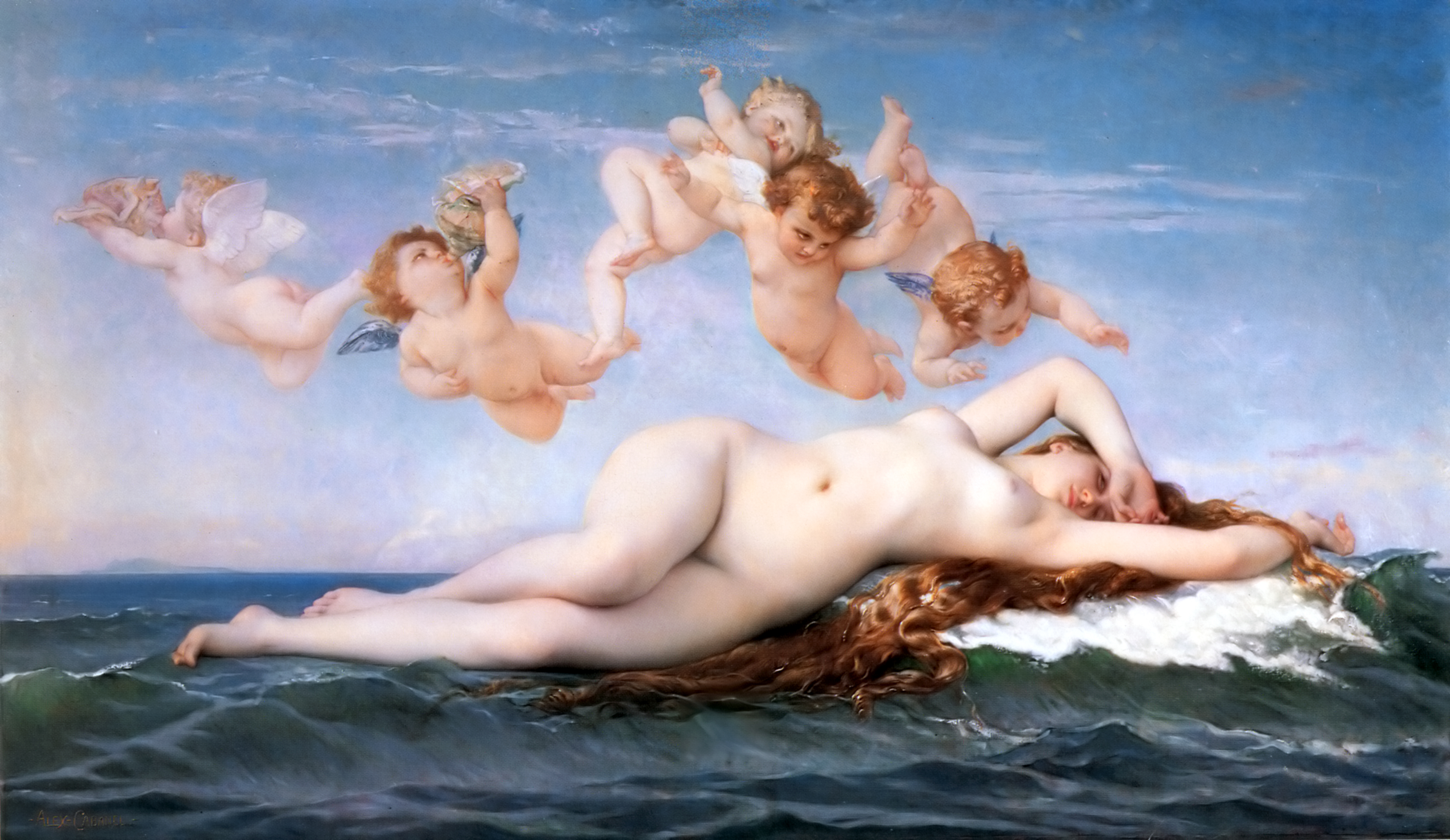
The Birth of Venus by Alexandre Cabanel, 1863 (Musée d'Orsay, Paris).

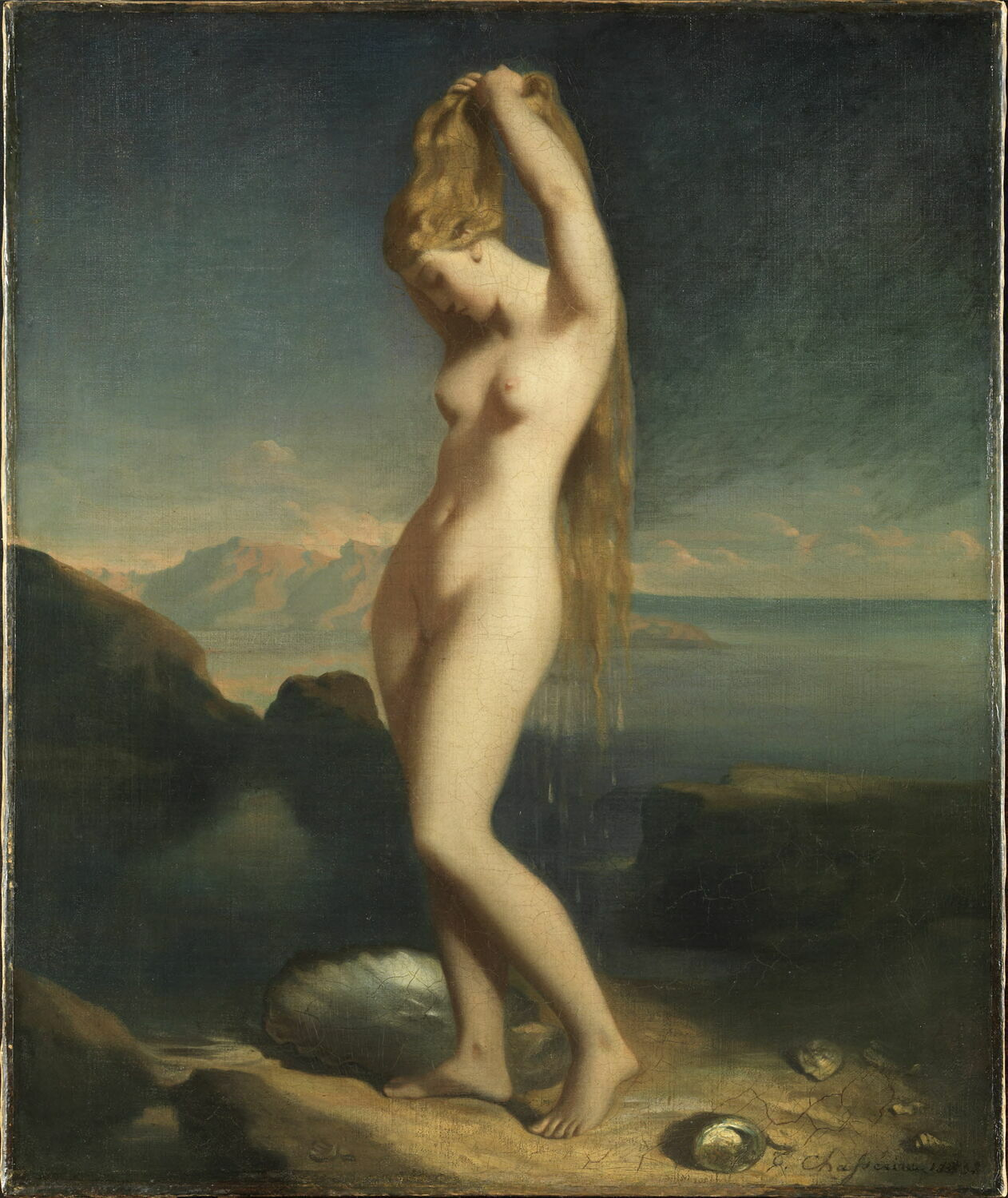
Venus Anadyomene by Théodore Chassériau, 1838

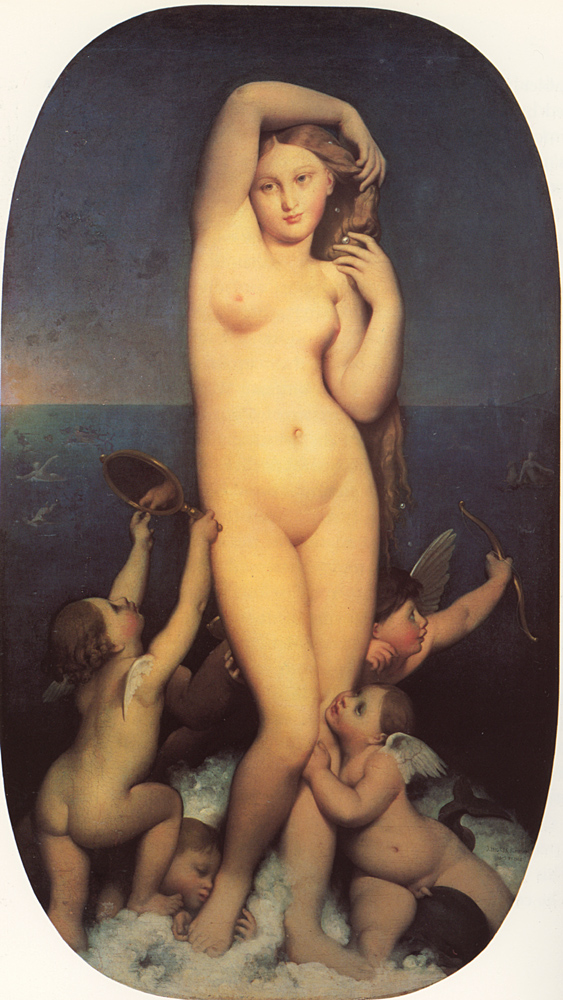
Venus Anadyomene by Jean-Auguste-Dominique Ingres, completed in 1848

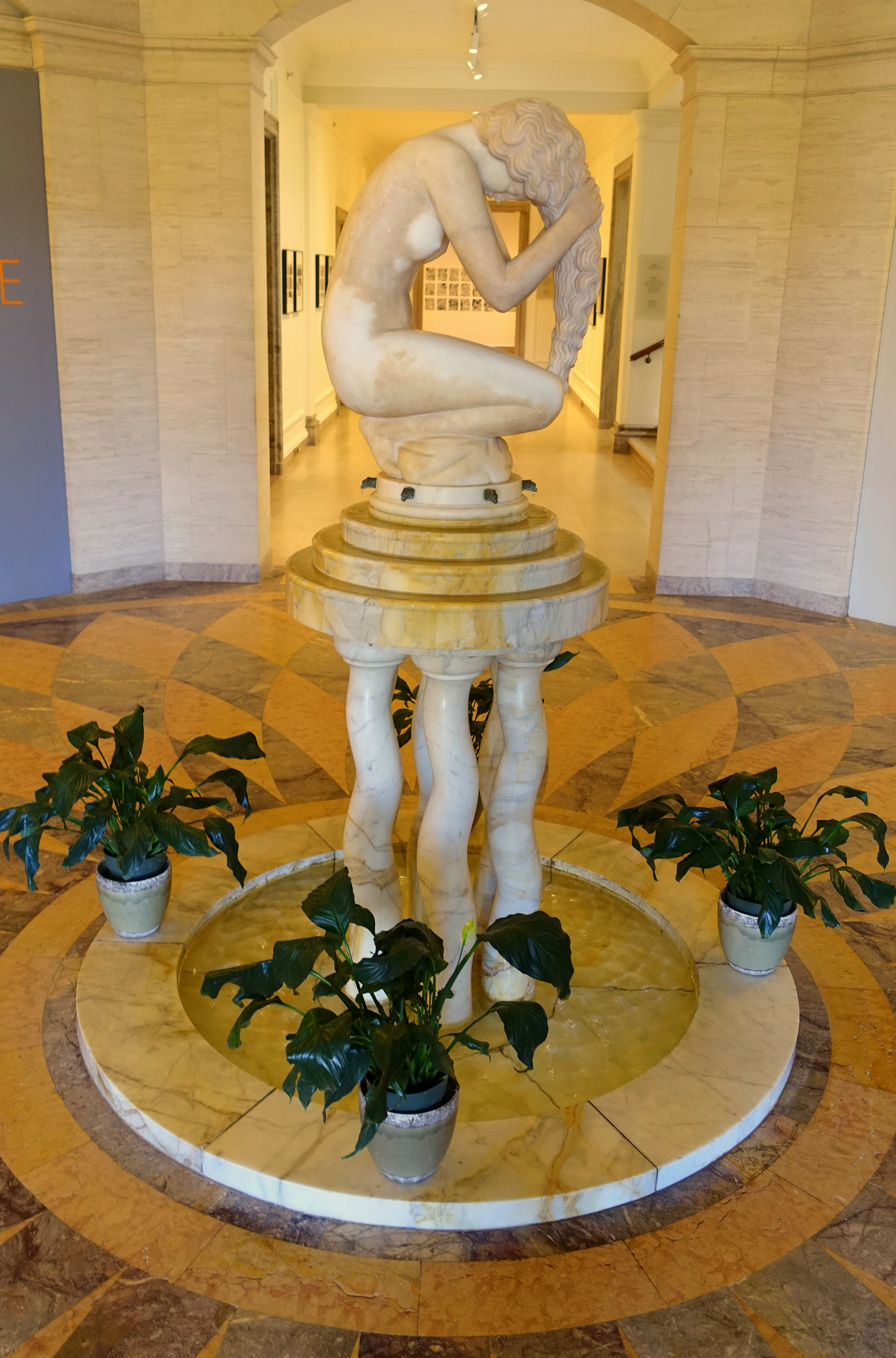
Venus Anadyomene by Paul Manship, 1927 (Addison Gallery of American Art)

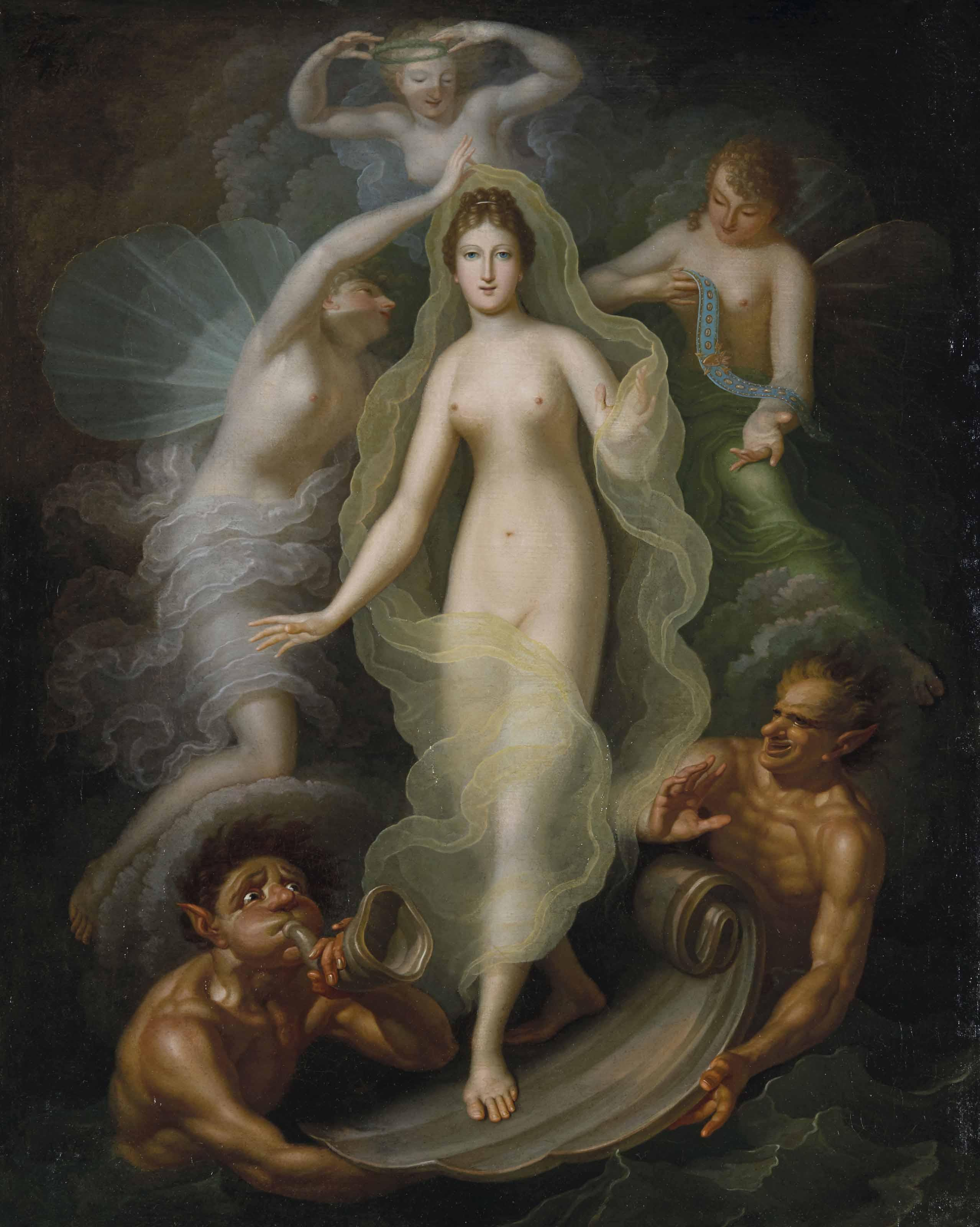
Venus Anadyomene by Claude Pinet, 1830, Private Collection
