= Acceptance in lieu =

Provision in British tax law

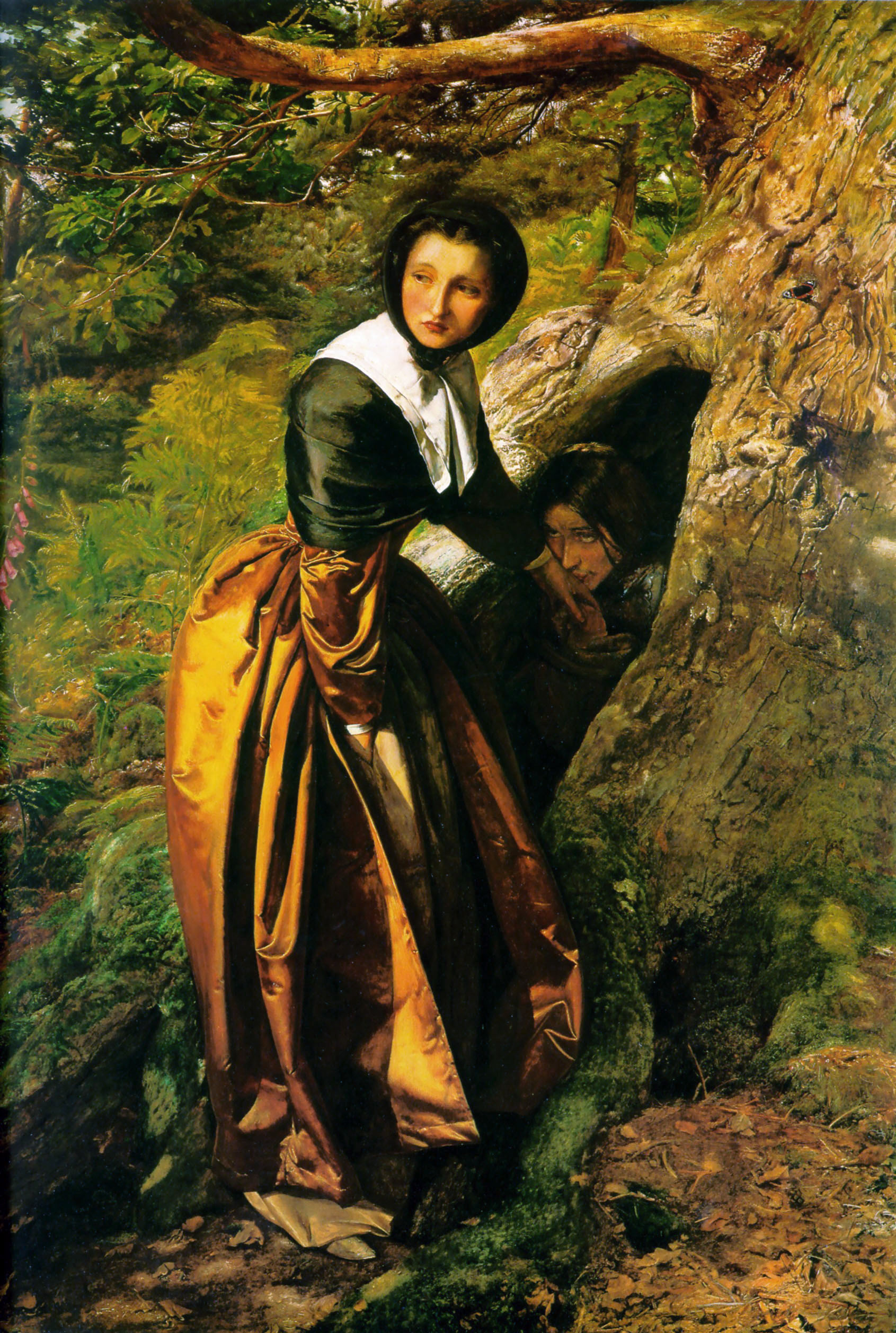
The Proscribed Royalist by John Everett Millais was acquired by the government through the scheme in 2009

Acceptance in Lieu (AIL or AiL) is a provision in British tax law under which inheritance tax debts can be written off in exchange for the acquisition of objects of national importance. It was originally established by Chancellor of the Exchequer David Lloyd George as a means for the wealthy to pay the increased estate taxes imposed by his People's Budget of 1909, but had its roots in similar schemes dating to the late 19th century. It has developed from the early years, when it was used mainly as a means for the aristocracy to dispose of country estates to the National Trust, to the modern day, when it is more associated with the transfer of works of art, antiquities and archive material to museums. The scheme is administered by Arts Council England, a non-departmental public body of the Department for Culture, Media and Sport. The scheme has brought many houses, works of art and other collections into publicly accessible institutions when they would otherwise have gone to auction. Since 2013, the Acceptance in Lieu panel also oversees donations made through the Cultural Gifts Scheme, which allows still-living taxpayers to donate gifts of cultural significance in return for a credit on income tax, capital gains tax or corporation tax.

== History ==
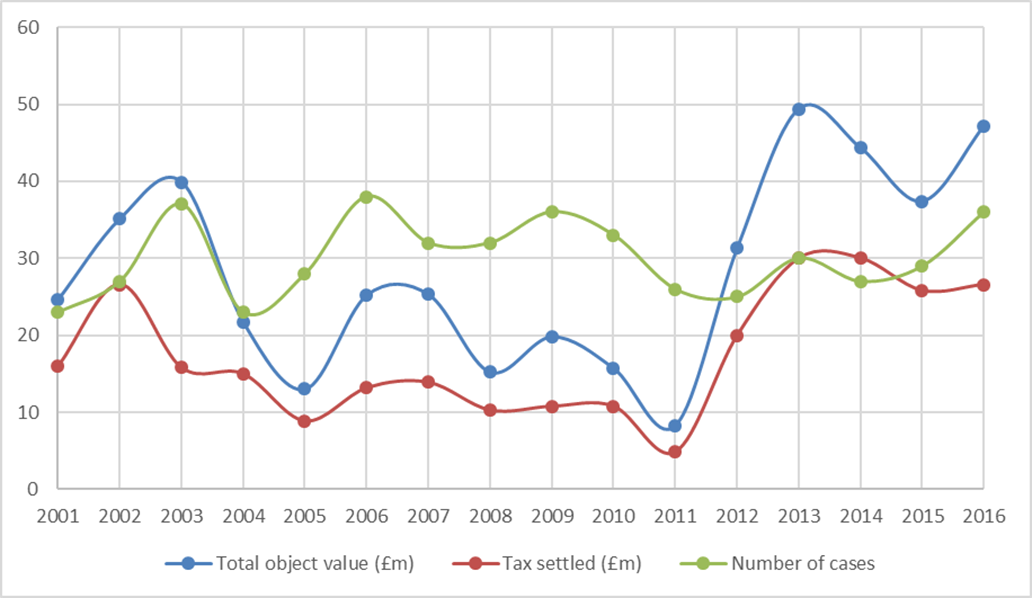
Graph of tax settlement values (red), total object values (blue) and number of cases (green), 2001–16. Includes Cultural Gifts Scheme objects since 2013

With increasing death duty (later known as estate duty, capital transfer tax and inheritance tax) being levied on the wealthy in the late 19th century many were forced to sell off their large country houses and estates to pay for their tax liabilities. This often resulted in unique family collections of antiques and works of art being lost and dispersed. The 1896 Finance Act sought to limit the damage by exempting nationally important works of art from taxation and was strengthened by the 1903 establishment of the National Art Collections Fund which sought to acquire important paintings for the nation. Houses and collections continued to be sold however and David Lloyd George's People's Budget of 1909, with its increased land and estate taxes, would have worsened matters. However Lloyd George made a provision in the Finance Act 1910 for the creation of the Acceptance in Lieu scheme to allow land to be given to the nation in lieu of Estate Duty.

The scheme was little used in its early years owing to the disruption of the First World War and the Treasury's insistence that any shortfall in tax caused by the scheme was made up by reductions in the budget of a government department. The government made it easier for country estates to be given to the nation in the National Trust Act of 1937 and the Finance Act of 1953, which allowed for the contents of houses to be transferred also. The years after World War II saw a large number of houses given to the nation in this manner and brought into the custody of the National Trust. A minor scandal erupted in 1977 when the Treasury refused to accept the late Lord Rosebery's Mentmore house in lieu of £2 million of inheritance tax, seeing it instead sold at public auction for £6.25 million and enter private hands. As a result, new guidelines for the scheme were introduced by the 1980 National Heritage Act.

Conservative Minister for the Arts Grey Ruthven, 2nd Earl of Gowrie provided a guaranteed allocation of £10 million a year (later increased to the present level of £20 million) from the Treasury reserves to make up the tax revenue shortfall arising from objects received for the nation. Having originally been associated mainly with the acquisition of country estates for the National Trust by the late 20th century the scheme was becoming known more for accepting works of art and archival material for national, regional and local collections. This is due to a decline in inheritance tax levels from 75% in 1975 to 40% by 1988, rising artwork prices and more effective tax arrangements made by the owners of large, historic houses. Since 1984 only one country house has been given to the nation through the Acceptance in Lieu scheme, this being Seaton Delaval Hall which was allocated to the National Trust in 2009. The scheme continues to provide a valuable means of preserving national treasures and has provided objects worth £140 million to public collections in the five years following 2006. Though the National Trust is still a large recipient of assets, receiving more than £21 million worth in 2000–10, objects are allocated to a wide variety of institutions of all levels across the country and there are few major public collections that have not received a donation from the scheme.

== Procedure ==
The current legislation under which the scheme is established is Section 230 of the Inheritance Tax Act 1984. The scheme applies to works of art, manuscripts, heritage objects and historic documents. In addition items must be in an acceptable condition and of "particular historical, artistic, scientific or local significance, either individually or collectively, or associated with a building in public ownership, such as a National Trust property, which will be expected to have public access for at least 100 days each year". Different rules apply to manuscripts and archive material which must have "an especially close association with our history and national life", "especial artistic or art-historical importance", "especial importance for the study of some particular branch of art, learning or history" or "an especially close association with a particular historic setting".

Approval of potential cases lies with the Secretary of State for Culture, Media and Sport or the relevant ministers in the devolved Scottish and Welsh governments (where applicable). The minister is advised on the acquisition of an item by a panel of experts from Arts Council England in most cases (the Historical Manuscripts Commissioner at The National Archives advises on manuscripts). Until its abolition in October 2011 the Museums, Libraries and Archives Council provided the advising panel. The panel assesses the open market value of an item and passes this to the minister who makes the final decision whether to accept it or not. The panel aims to provide an assessment of value that is fair to the offerer and the tax-payer.

Once accepted any items currently associated with buildings in public ownership are allowed to remain there, provided public access is available. If they are associated with a private building they may be granted to a public museum but lent back to the house-owner providing public access and security can be maintained. This arrangement allows for unique collections (such as the contents of country estates) to remain intact and not be dispersed or separated from their associated historic buildings. Other items might be allocated by the minister to a museum or gallery at no cost, particularly where the offerer has requested a specific institution be assigned the item. Other items are advertised to museums who are invited to apply for their allocation. In cases where the value of an item exceeds the tax settled the institution receiving the item will pay the difference to the offerer.

Due to certain tax benefits an item offered under the Acceptance in Lieu scheme is worth 17% more to the offerer than if the item was sold at public auction. This makes the scheme a particularly attractive alternative and has been described by the government as "the most important means of acquiring important works of art and cultural objects for public ownership". Some criticism of the scheme has focussed on its failure to provide for settlement of "everyday" taxes such as income tax such as occurs in France, Ireland and Australia.

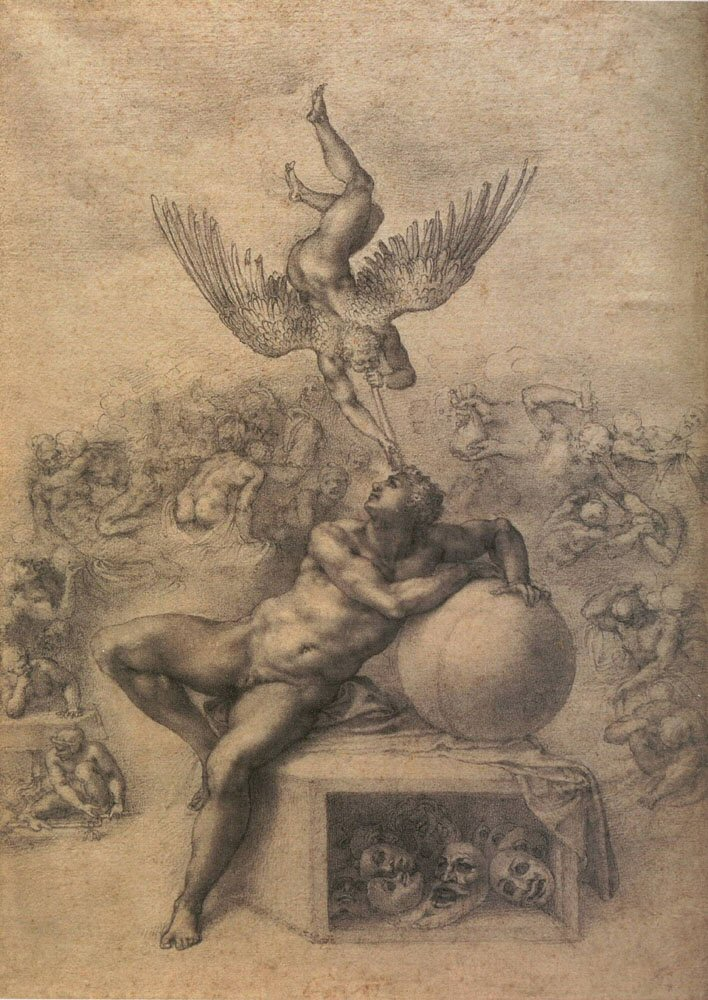
The Dream, one of Michelangelo's finest drawings, was accepted in 1981 and allocated to the Courtauld Institute of Art

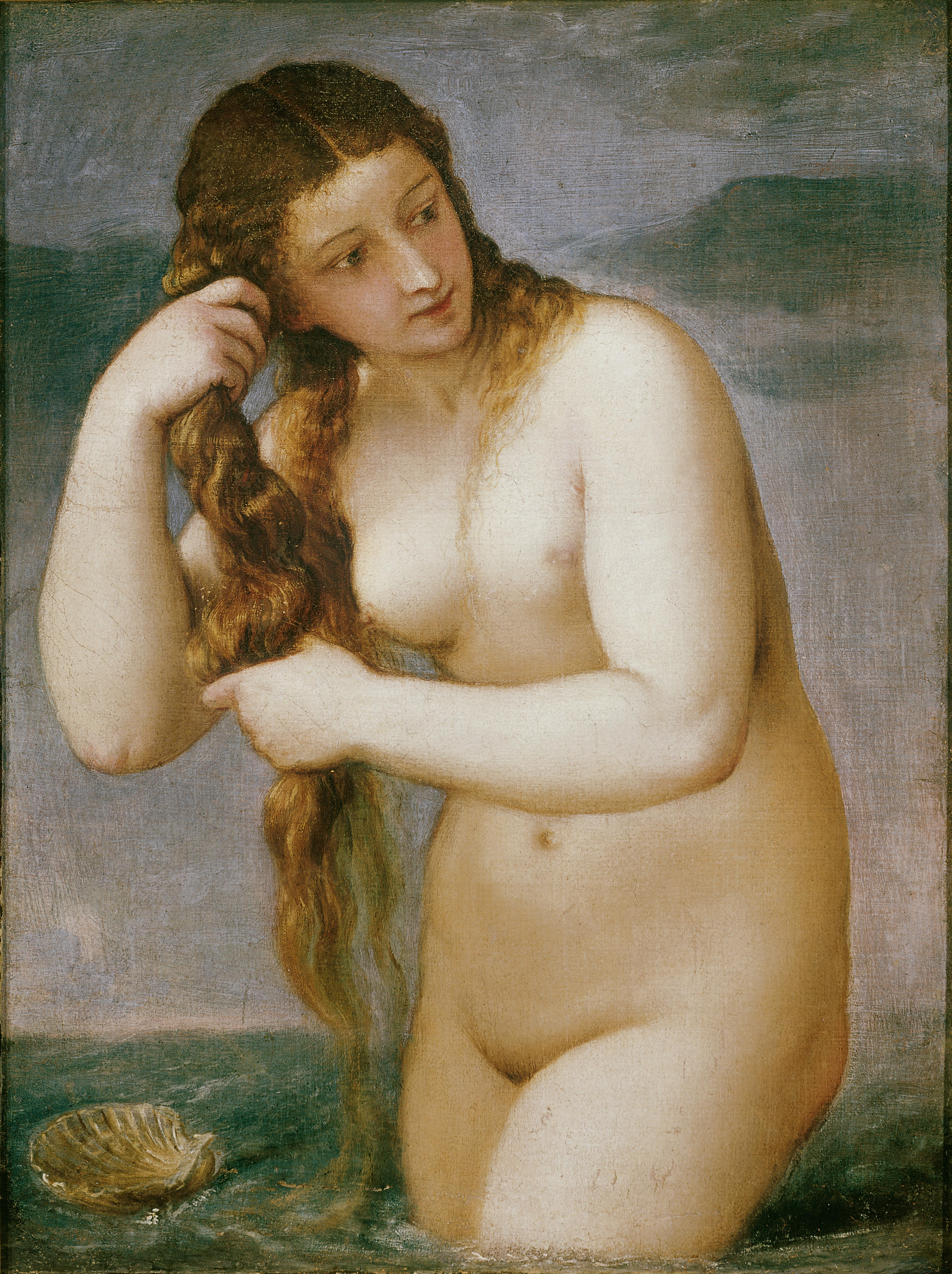
Titian's Venus Anadyomene was allocated to the National Galleries of Scotland in 2003
