= Villa Farnesina =

Villa in Rome, central Italy

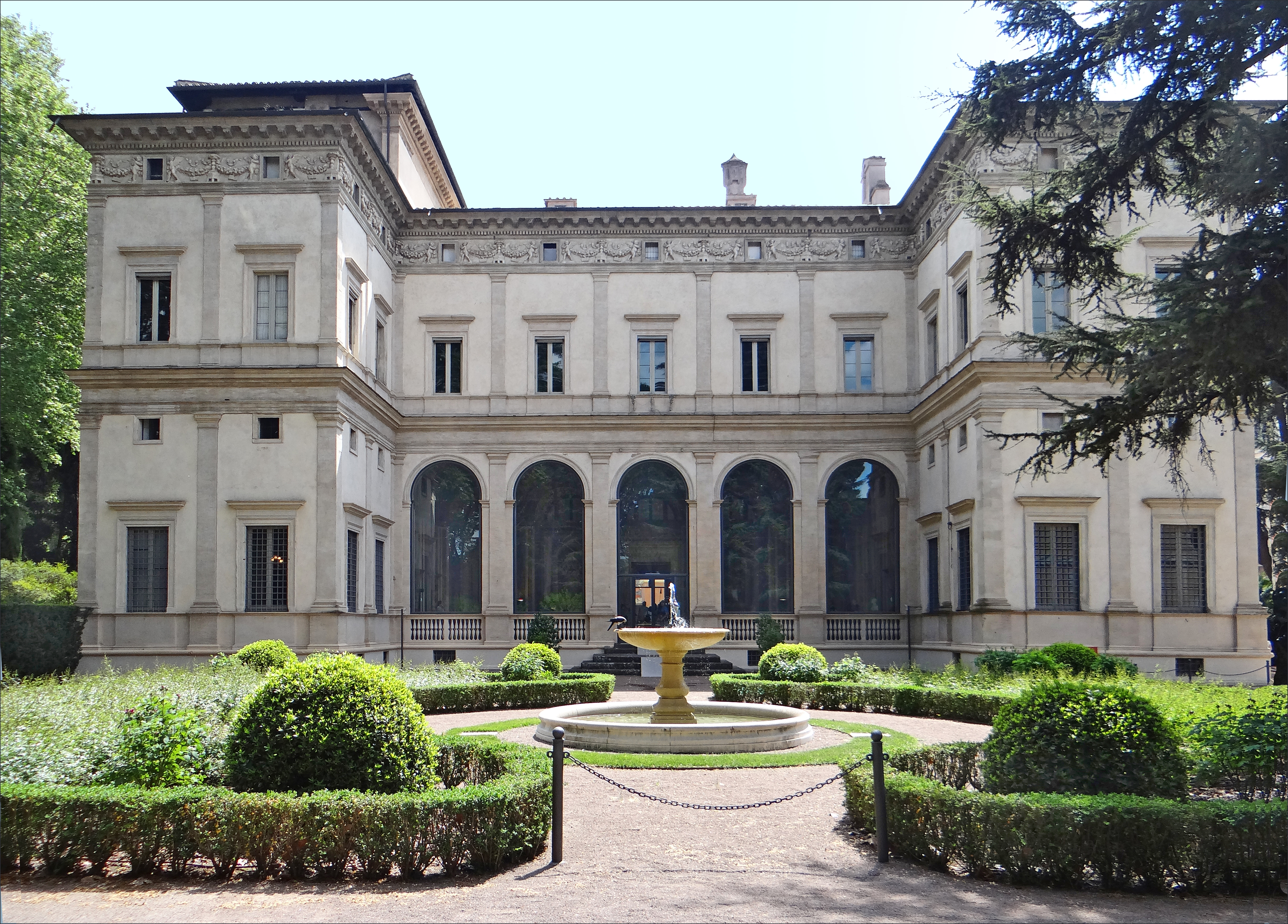
- La villa Farnesina
- Click on the map for a fullscreen view

General information
- Location: Rome, Trastevere, Italy
- Coordinates: 41.893611°N 12.4675°E
- Construction started: 1506
- Completed: 1510
- Client: Agostino Chigi

The Villa Farnesina is a Renaissance suburban villa in the Via della Lungara, in the district of Trastevere in Rome, central Italy. Built between 1506 and 1510 for Agostino Chigi, the Pope's wealthy Sienese banker, it was a novel type of suburban villa, subsidiary to his main Palazzo Chigi in the city. It is especially famous for the rich frescos by Raphael and other High Renaissance artists that remain in situ.

Now owned by the Italian state, the principal rooms can be visited.

== Description ==
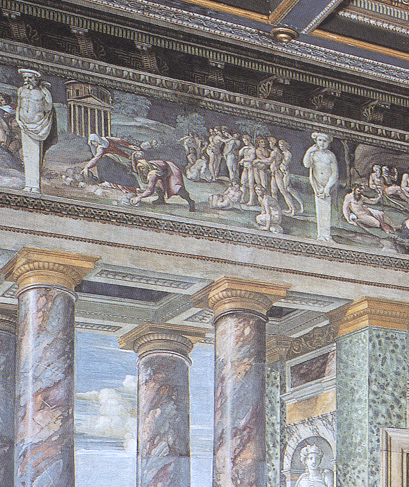
Detail of frescoes in the "Perspectives' Hall" by Baldassare Peruzzi

The villa was built for Agostino Chigi, a rich Sienese banker and the treasurer of Pope Julius II. Between 1506 and 1510, the Sienese artist and pupil of Bramante, Baldassare Peruzzi, aided perhaps by Giuliano da Sangallo, designed and erected the villa. The novelty of this suburban villa design can be discerned from its differences from that of a typical urban palazzo (palace). Renaissance palaces typically faced onto a street and were decorated versions of defensive castles: rectangular blocks with rusticated ground floors and enclosing a courtyard. This villa, intended to be an airy summer pavilion, presented a side towards the street and was given a U-shaped plan with a five-bay loggia between the arms. The main entrance was through the north facing loggia which was open.

Chigi also commissioned the fresco decoration of the villa by artists such as Raphael, Sebastiano del Piombo, Giulio Romano, and Il Sodoma. The themes were inspired by the Stanze of the poet Angelo Poliziano, a key member of the circle of Lorenzo de' Medici. Best known are Raphael's frescoes on the ground floor; in the loggia depicting the classical and secular myths of Cupid and Psyche, and The Triumph of Galatea. This, one of his few purely secular paintings, shows the near-naked nymph on a shell-shaped chariot amid frolicking attendants and is reminiscent of Botticelli's The Birth of Venus. This same "Galatea" loggia has a horoscope vault that displays the positions of the planets around the zodiac on the patron's birth date, 29 November 1466. The two main ceiling panels of the vault give his precise time of birth, 9:30 pm on that date.

At first floor level, Peruzzi painted the main salone with trompe-l'œil frescoes of a grand open loggia with an illusory city and countryside view beyond. The perspective of the painted balcony and colonnade is very accurate from a fixed point in the room. In the adjoining bedroom, Sodoma painted scenes from the life of Alexander the Great, the marriage of Alexander and Roxana, and Alexander receiving the family of Darius.

Alongside these paintings are over 170 plants, including both Old World and New World species, painted by Giovanni Martine da Udine. Painted between 1515 and 1518, these paintings include the first generally recognised depictions in Europe of Zea Mays (maize, corn) and Cucurbita maxima (squash), as well as some of the first depictions in Europe of Cucurbita pepo and possibly Cucurbita moschata. Another remarkable feature in these paintings is a "well-known phallic representation of an elongated gourd penetrating a fig".

The villa became the property of the Farnese family in 1577 (hence the name of Farnesina). Also in the 16th century, Michelangelo proposed linking the Palazzo Farnese on the other side of the River Tiber, where he was working, to the Villa Farnesina with a private bridge. This was initiated, as remnants of a few arches are present in the back of Palazzo Farnese towards via Giulia on the other side of the Tiber, but was never completed.

Later the villa belonged to the Bourbons of Naples and in 1861 to the Spanish Ambassador in Rome, Bermudez de Castro, Duke of Ripalta. Today, owned by the Italian State, it accommodates the Accademia dei Lincei, a long-standing and renowned Roman academy of sciences. Until 2007 it also housed the Gabinetto dei Disegni e delle Stampe (Department of Drawings and Prints) of the Istituto Nazionale per la Grafica, Roma.

The Villa Farnesina is the subject of a scholarly monograph in German and two luxuriously illustrated volumes in Italian, by Christoph Luitpold Frommel (1961, 2003, 2017). A team led by the architect Cesare Cundari published an important volume of plans and 3D models in 2017. The most comprehensive study is The Villa Farnesina: Palace of Venus in Renaissance Rome by James Grantham Turner (Cambridge University Press, 2022), which won the PROSE Award for best art history title from the American Association of Publishers, 2023.

The main rooms of the villa, including the Loggia, are open to visitors.

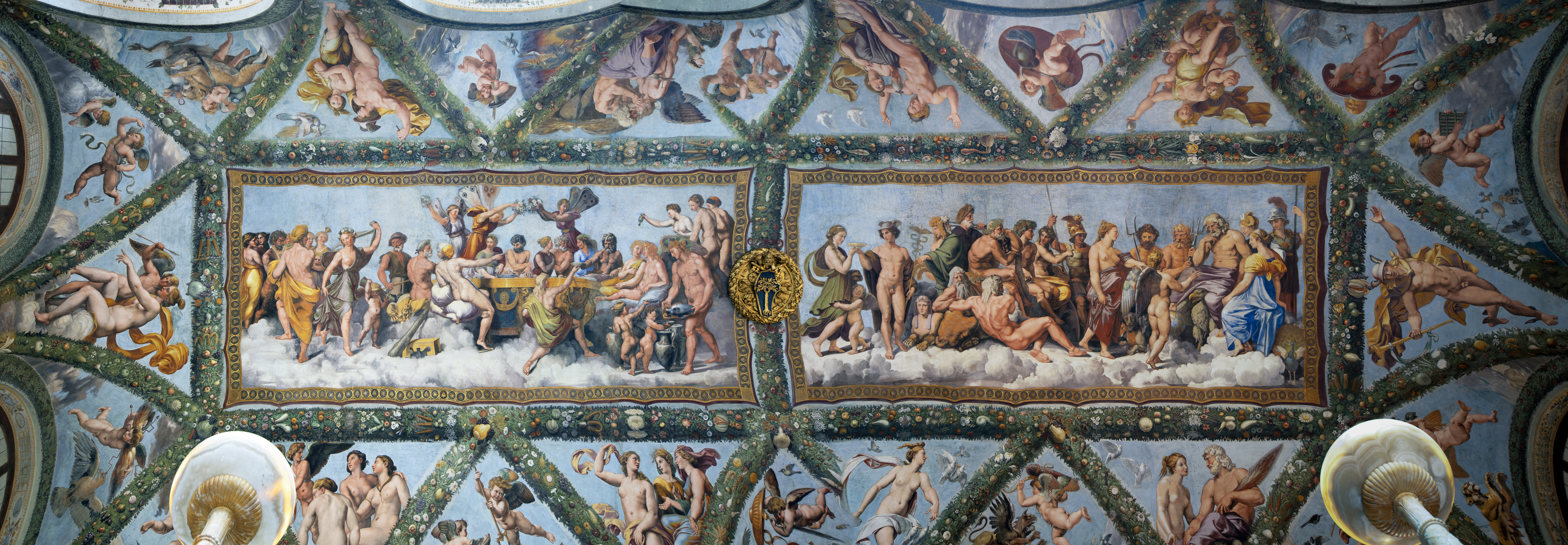
Raphael's fresco Cupid and Psyche

== See also ==
- Galatea (Raphael)

Preceded by Palazzo Zuccari, Rome	Landmarks of Rome; Villa Farnesina	Succeeded by Villa Giulia
