= The Birth of Venus (Gérôme) =

Painting by Jean-Léon Gérôme

- La Naissance de Vénus (French)
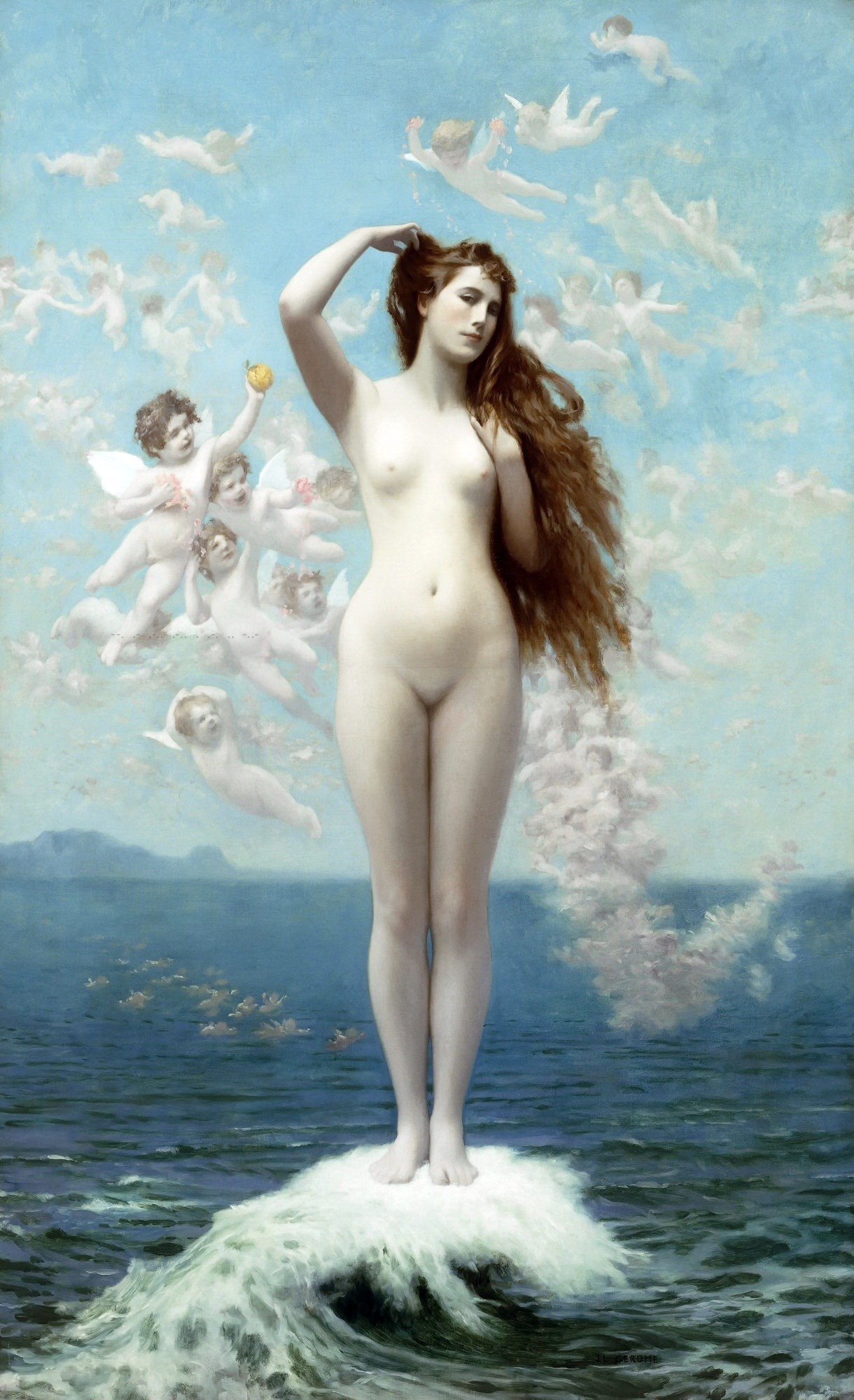
- Artist: Jean-Léon Gérôme
- Year: 1890
- Medium: oil on canvas
- Dimensions: 129.5 cm × 79.5 cm (51.0 in × 31.3 in)
- Location: Private collection

The Birth of Venus or Venus Rising (The Star) (French: La Naissance de Vénus; Vénus — l'étoile) is an 1890 painting by Jean-Léon Gérôme. It depicts the mythological birth of Venus from the sea.

Sold at auction in 1991, it is currently in a private collection.

== Description ==
Jean-Léon Gérôme was an exponent of academism, the nineteenth-century French art based on the academies of Fine Arts. During his life he was greatly inspired by Greco-Roman mythology and also specialized in the female artistic nude. The work depicts the birth of Venus, the goddess of love in Roman mythology. The goddess emerges from the sea, on a small wave, surrounded by dozens of putti, one of which holds a golden apple in one hand that recalls the apple of contention, which in the myth of the judgment of Paris was given to the goddess of love. Unlike many other works on the same artistic theme, which actually depict the arrival of the goddess on the island of Cyprus, this painting portrays the moment of the birth of the goddess. In the background an island stands out on the horizon.
