= The Birth of Venus (Boucher) =

Painting by François Boucher

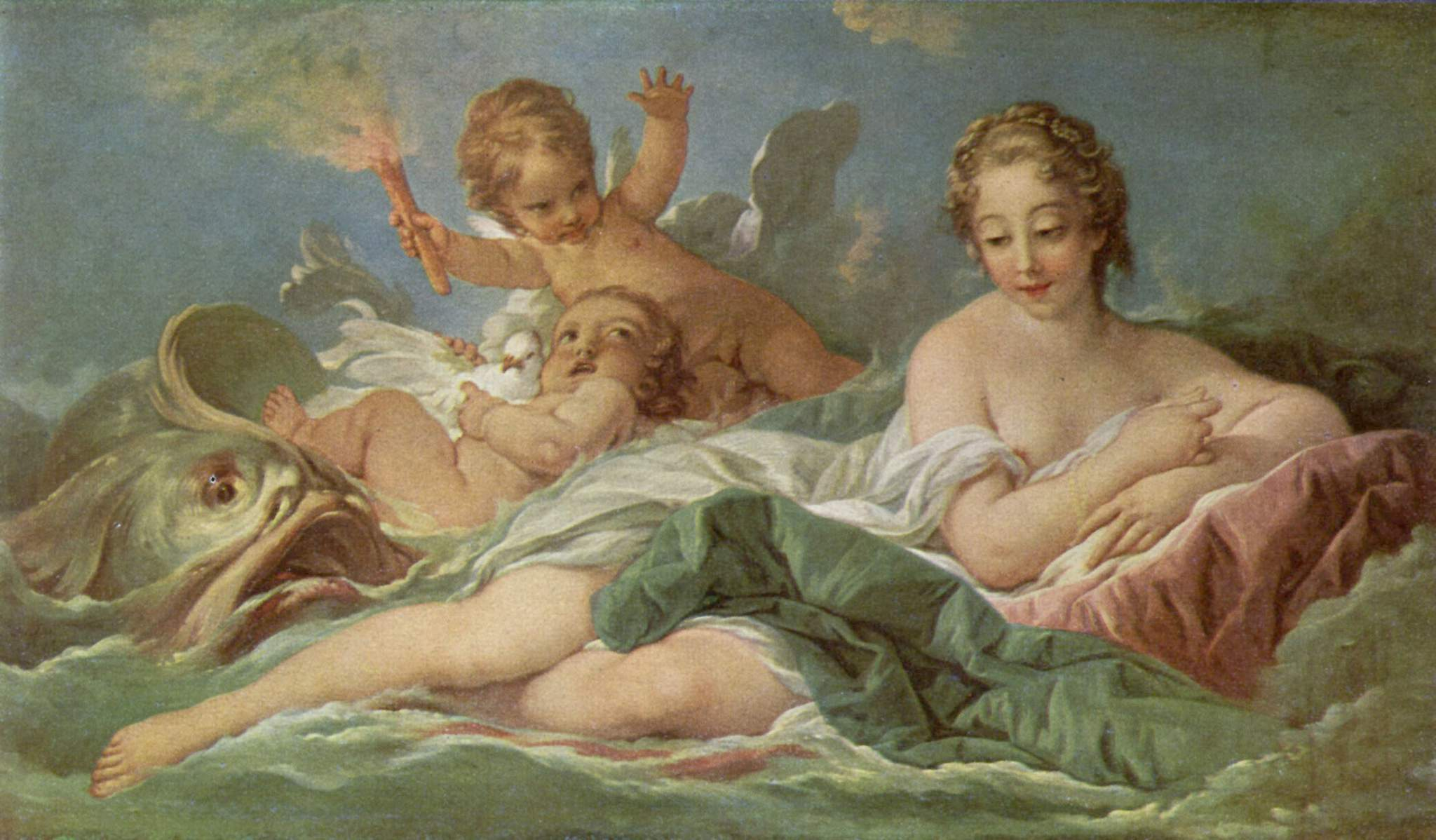
- Artist: François Boucher
- Year: c. 1750–1770
- Medium: Oil on canvas
- Dimensions: 67.3 cm × 119.2 cm (26.5 in × 46.9 in)
- Location: Wallace Collection, London
- Accession: P433

The Birth of Venus is an oil-on-canvas painting by the French Rococo artist François Boucher, created c. 1750–1770. It is held in the Wallace Collection, in London, England. The painting was adapted from a 1743 oval composition by Boucher, now part of a private collection in New York.
