= The Birth of Venus (Bouguereau) =

Painting by William-Adolphe Bouguereau

- La Naissance de Vénus (French)
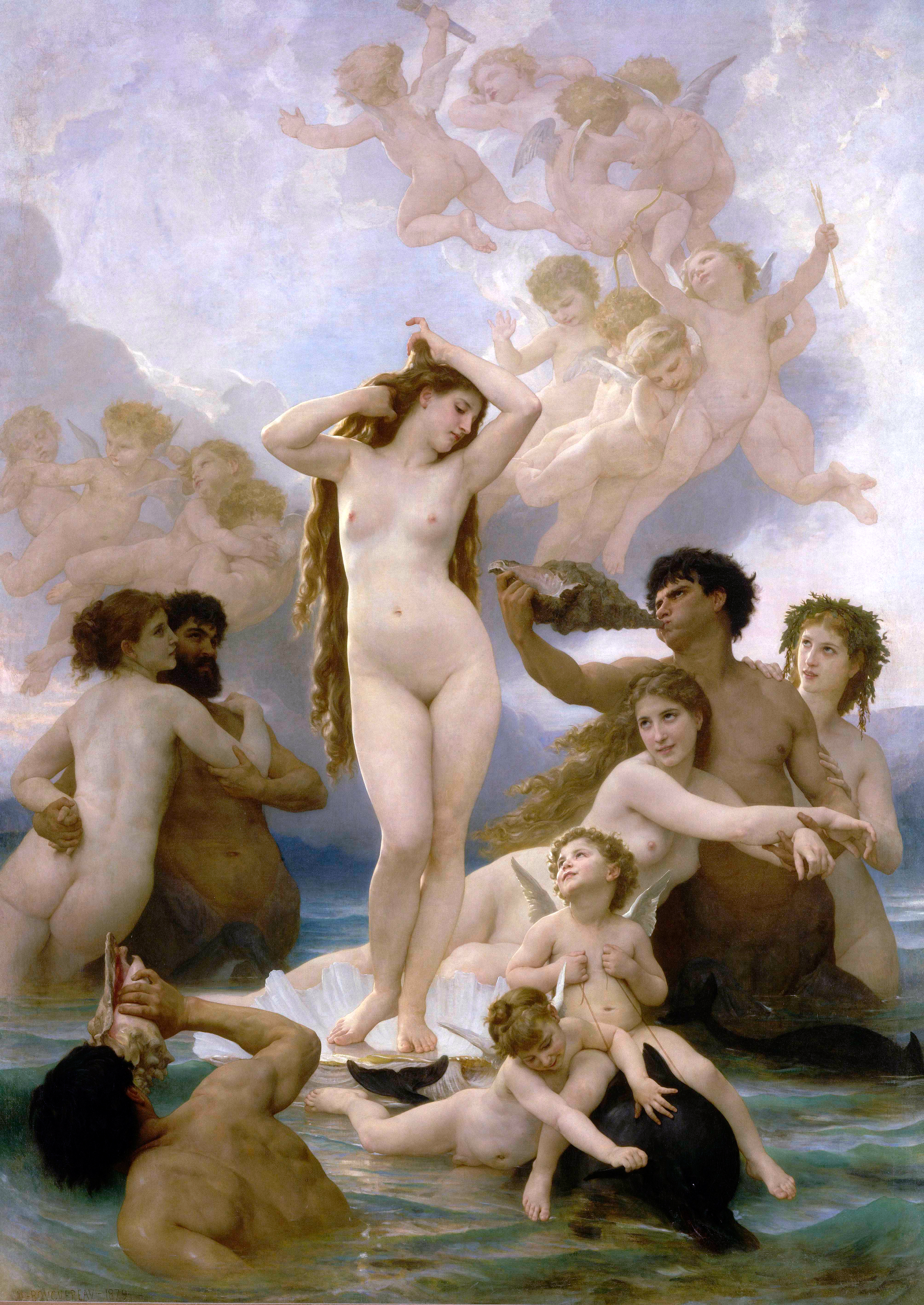
- Artist: William-Adolphe Bouguereau
- Year: 1879
- Medium: oil on canvas
- Dimensions: 300 cm × 218 cm (120 in × 86 in)
- Location: Musée d'Orsay, Paris

The Birth of Venus (French: La Naissance de Vénus) is one of the most famous paintings by 19th-century painter William-Adolphe Bouguereau. It depicts not the actual birth of Venus from the sea, but her transportation in a shell as a fully mature woman from the sea to Paphos in Cyprus. She is considered the epitome of the Classical Greek and Roman ideal of the female form and beauty, on par with Venus de Milo.

For Bouguereau, it is considered a tour de force. The canvas stands at just over 300 centimetres (9 feet 10 inches) high, and 218 cm (7 ft 2 in) wide. The subject matter, as well as the composition, resembles a previous rendition of this subject, Sandro Botticelli's The Birth of Venus, as well as Raphael's The Triumph of Galatea.

== Description ==
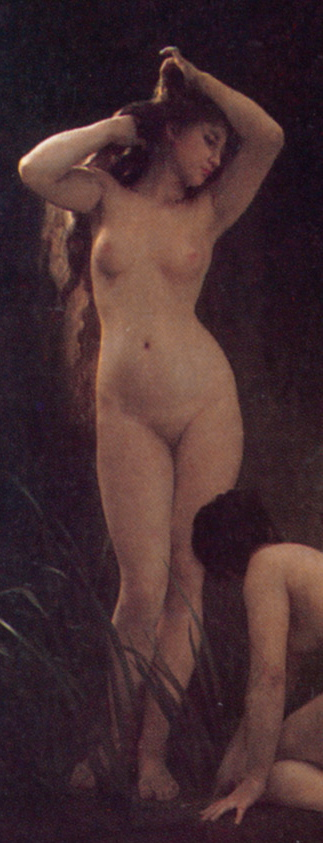
Detail from The Nymphaeum, executed by Bouguereau in 1878. Venus' figure was enlarged from this nymph.

At the center of the painting, Venus stands nude on a scallop shell being pulled by a dolphin, one of her symbols. Fifteen putti, including Cupid and his lover Psyche, and several nymphs and centaurs have gathered to witness Venus' arrival. Most of the figures are gazing at her, and two of the centaurs are blowing into conch and Triton shells, signaling her arrival.

Venus is considered to be the embodiment of feminine beauty and form, and these traits are shown in the painting. Her head is tilted to one side, and her facial expression reflects that she is calm and comfortable with her nudity. She raises her arms, arranging her thigh-length, brown hair, swaying elegantly in an "S" curve contrapposto, emphasizing the curves of her body.

Venus' figure was enlarged from a nymph from Bouguereau's The Nymphaeum, completed in 1878, a year earlier. The nymph is slightly thinner, and her breasts are fuller and more rounded. Venus' contrapposto is more intense, and her hair is also longer and lighter than the nymph's, but she arranges it almost identically.

To the uppеr-left of the painting, there is a shadow in the clouds. It appears to be the silhouette of the artist, with a head, shoulder, arm, and a raised fist that would seem to hold a paintbrush.
