= Galatea (Raphael) =

Fresco by Raphael

The Triumph of Galatea
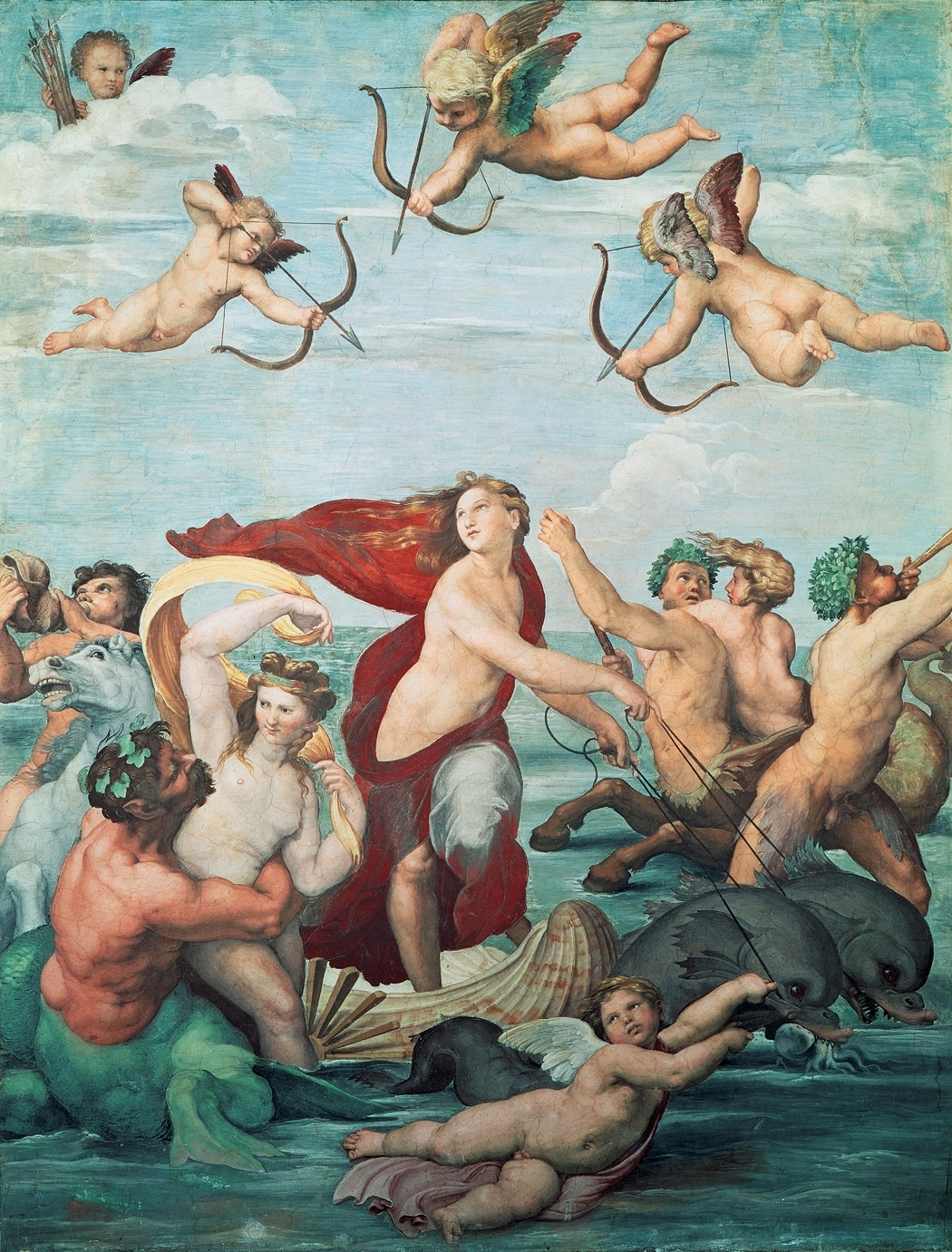
- Artist: Raphael
- Year: c. 1512
- Type: Fresco
- Dimensions: 295 cm × 225 cm (116 in × 89 in)
- Location: Villa Farnesina, Rome

The Triumph of Galatea is a fresco completed around 1512 by the Italian painter Raphael for the Villa Farnesina in Rome.

The Farnesina was built for the Sienese banker Agostino Chigi, one of the richest men of that age. The Farnese family later acquired and renamed the villa, smaller than the more ostentatious palazzo at the other side of the Tiber. The fresco is a mythological scene of a series embellishing the open gallery of the building, a series which was inspired by the "Stanzas on the Tournament" of the poet Angelo Poliziano. In Greek mythology, the beautiful Nereid Galatea had fallen in love with the peasant shepherd Acis. Her consort, one-eyed giant Polyphemus, after chancing upon the two lovers together, lobbed an enormous pillar and killed Acis – Sebastiano del Piombo produced a fresco of Polyphemus next to Raphael's work.

Raphael did not paint any of the main events of the story. He chose the scene of the nymph's apotheosis (Stanze, I, 118–119). Galatea appears surrounded by other sea creatures whose forms are somewhat inspired by Michelangelo, whereas the bright colors and decoration are supposed to be inspired by ancient Roman painting. At the left, a Triton (partly man, partly fish) abducts a sea nymph; behind them, another Triton uses a shell as a trumpet. Galatea rides a shell-chariot drawn by two dolphins.

Some have seen in the model for Galatea the image of Agostino Chigi's lover, the courtesan Imperia; however, Raphael's near-contemporary, Giorgio Vasari wrote that Raphael did not mean for Galatea to resemble any one human person, but to represent ideal beauty. When asked where he had found a model of such beauty, Raphael reportedly said that he had used "a certain idea" he had formed in his mind.

External videos
- Raphael, Galatea, at Khan Academy.

In a letter to Baldassare Castiglione, Raphael dictated via Pietro Aretino, that "to paint a beauty, I should have to see a number of beauties, provided Your Lordship were with me to choose the best. But in the absence of good judges and beautiful forms, I use an idea that comes to my mind."

Antonio Sgamellotti of the Lincei Academy and his colleagues analyzed the chemical composition of the blue pigment in the sea and sky of Triumph of Galatea. Sgamellotti said the researchers found evidence of Egyptian blue, a pigment thought to have been replaced after the fall of the Roman Empire with the use of lapis lazuli. Raphael may have chosen to recreate the brilliant pigment for this depiction of the heroine of a Greek myth because of his interest in the ancient world, Sgamellotti explained.

== See also ==
- List of paintings by Raphael
