= Venus and Adonis (Titian) =

Series of paintings on the same subject by Titian and his workshop

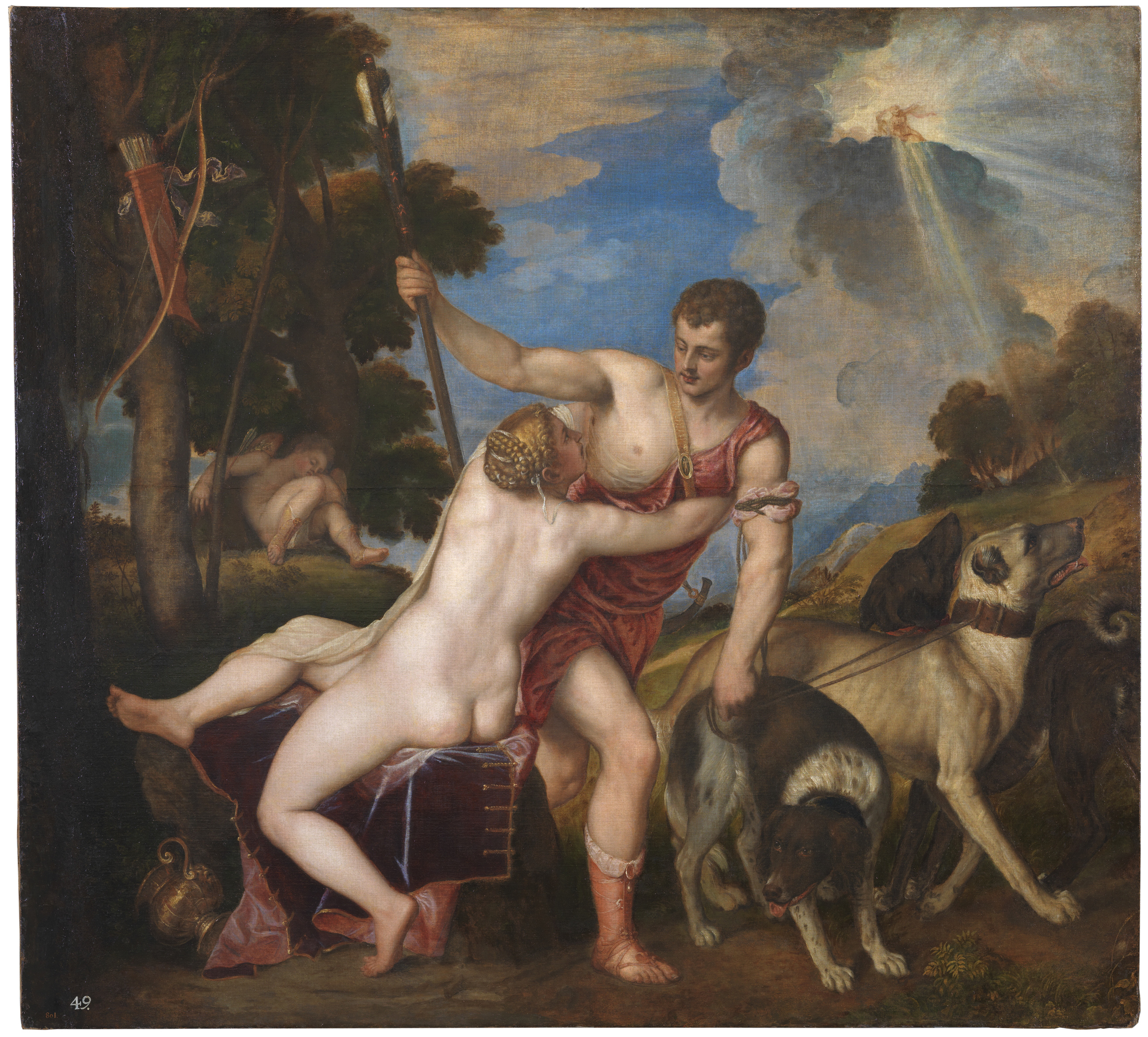
Venus and Adonis by Titian, Prado, 1554. The "Prado type"

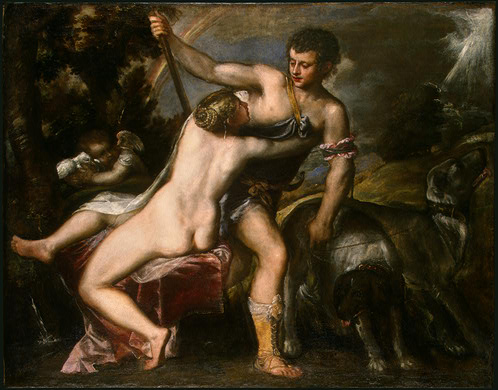
National Gallery of Art, Washington. Example of the "Farnese type".

A composition of Venus and Adonis by the Venetian Renaissance artist Titian has been painted a number of times, by Titian himself, by his studio assistants and by others. In all there are some thirty versions that may date from the 16th century, the nudity of Venus undoubtedly accounting for this popularity. It is unclear which of the surviving versions, if any, is the original or prime version, and a matter of debate how much involvement Titian himself had with surviving versions. There is a precise date for only one version, that in the Prado in Madrid, which is documented in correspondence between Titian and Philip II of Spain in 1554. However, this appears to be a later repetition of a composition first painted a considerable time earlier, possibly as early as the 1520s.

The Prado version is set at dawn and shows the young Adonis pulling himself away from Venus, his lover. He carries a feathered spear or "dart", a weapon often used in hunting in the 16th century. The leads of his three hounds are wound around his arm at right. Under the trees behind them at left Cupid lies asleep, with his bow and quiver of arrows hanging from a tree; this is not a time for love. High in the sky, a figure rides a chariot; this is either Venus from later in the story, or Apollo or Sol, representing the dawn. Venus sits on a rock covered with a rich tablecloth with gold braid edges and buttons (not a military jacket, as sometimes thought). Adonis has a horn hanging from his belt; his dress is classical, taken from Roman sculptures.

It is thought that the Roman poet Ovid was the main source, though other literary and visual sources have been suggested. In Book X of Ovid's Metamorphoses Adonis is a beautiful youth, a royal orphan, who spends his time hunting. Venus falls in love with him after one of Cupid's arrows hits her by mistake. They hunt together, but she avoids the fiercer animals, and warns him about them, citing the story of Atalanta. One day Adonis hunts alone and is gored by a wounded wild boar. Venus, in the sky in her chariot, hears his cries but cannot save him. In some versions, the death of Adonis is shown in the distance to the right. In Ovid, it is Venus who leaves first, and Adonis pulling himself away seems to be Titian's invention, for which some criticized him.

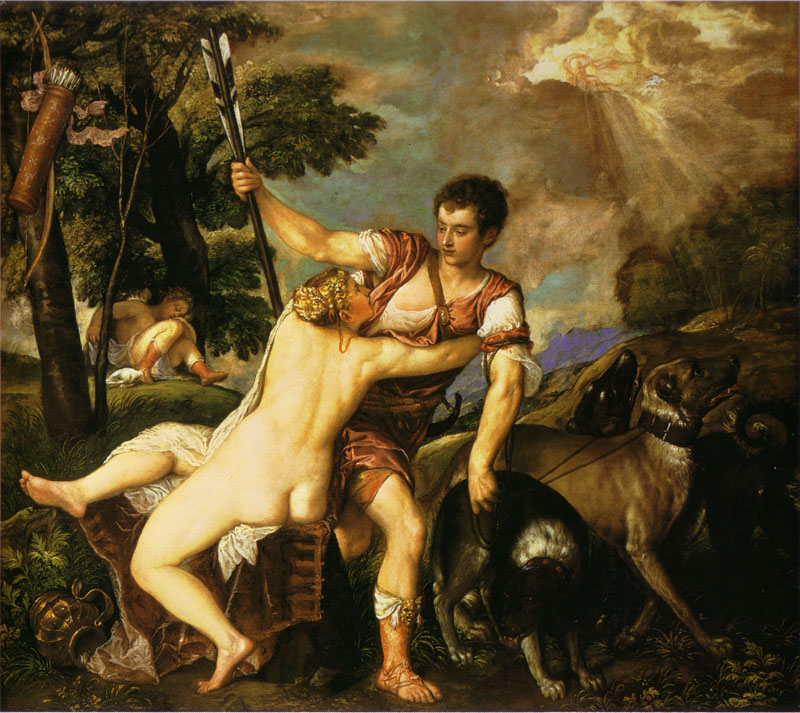
"Lausanne version", loaned to Ashmolean Museum, Oxford, but for auction in 2022.

Two basic types of the composition were described by Harold Wethey, who called them the "Prado" and "Farnese" types; the Prado type is most common and is described above. Alternative terms are the "three-dog" and "two-dog" types. They are in most respects the same, but the Farnese type has a tighter crop on the subject and a wider shape, losing most of the sky. Adonis' raised hand is just below the picture edge, so the feathers on the spear are not seen, nor is the chariot in the sky, though the sun bursts through clouds in about the same place. There are only two hounds and no gold vessel on the ground at left. Cupid is brought closer to the main couple, and is now awake, holding a dove in his hands.

== Prado type versions ==
The heights of these versions vary from 160–200 cm, but the widths are more consistent at 190–200 cm. All the Farnese versions are a good deal smaller, but their tighter composition makes the figures about the same size.

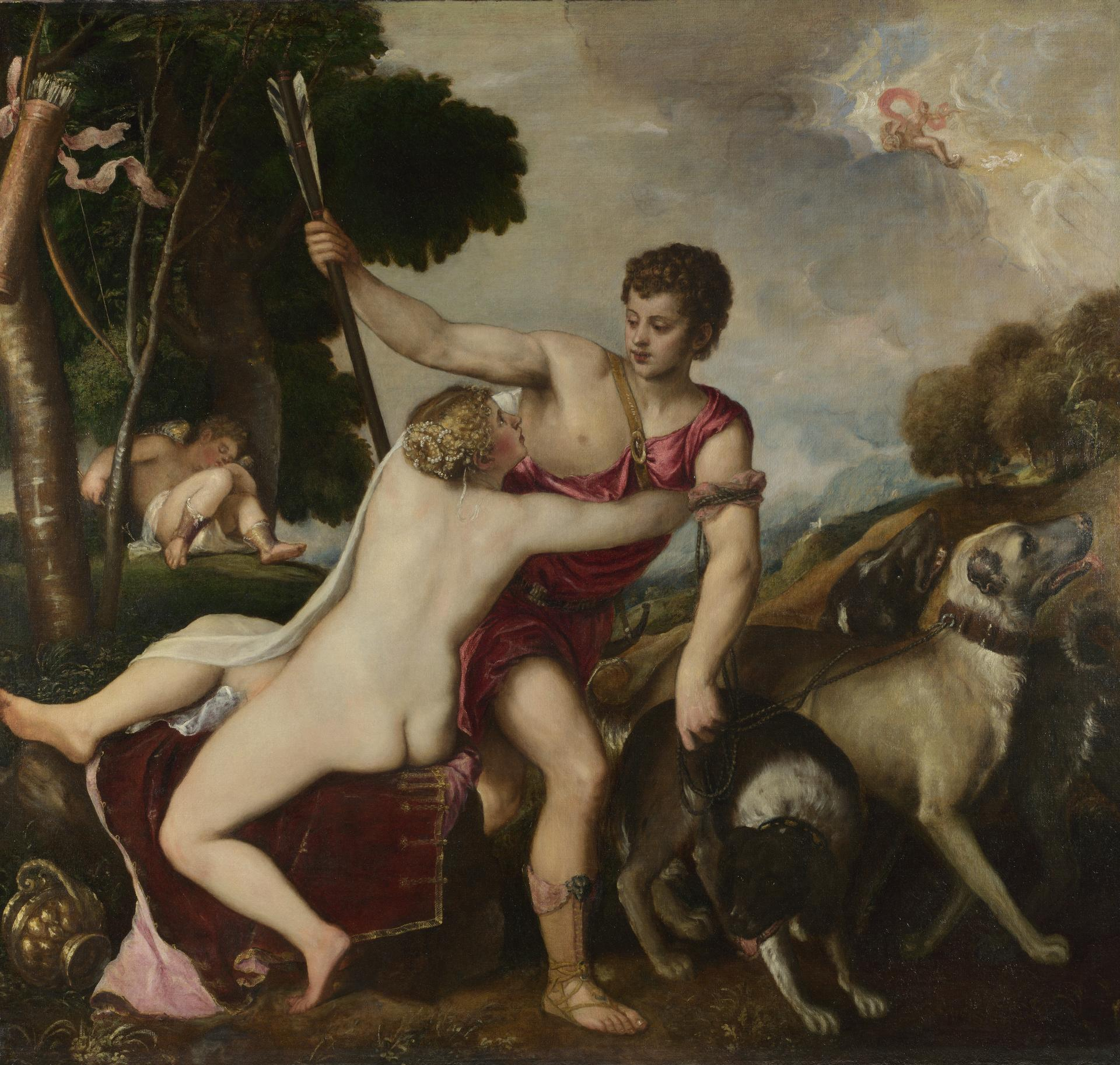
National Gallery, London, probably kept in the studio.

=== Prado, Madrid ===
The version now in Madrid's Museo del Prado is generally agreed to be the earliest of the surviving versions. Although not certainly documented until 1626, it is generally regarded as the painting documented as despatched to King Philip II of Spain in London (he was then married to Mary Tudor, and in fact not yet King of Spain, but King of England) by Titian in September 1554, as announced in a letter which survives. Philip received it in December, and wrote to a courtier complaining about "a fold made in packing". The Prado picture has a seam where two pieces of canvas were joined "which is indeed now very evident" on the picture.

A theory proposed by William R. (Roger) Rearick was that this first painting was in fact the "Lausanne" version, and Titian subsequently sent another version, the one now in the Prado, but this is rejected by Nicholas Penny and remains controversial. Adonis looks older in this than other versions, and Venus' body is shorter; later versions may have been made by copying the London version, which was retained in the studio in Venice. The Prado version is at least mostly by Titian, though Penny finds the head of Venus "disappointing".

It was part of a series of mythological paintings called "poesie" ("poems") intended for King Philip II of Spain. Venus and Adonis was designed to be viewed alongside Danaë, the first of the poesie, which was delivered in 1553, although they are not same size. A later version of Danaë is now shown in the same room in the Prado, with other Titians.

Titian explained in a letter to Philip that the two paintings would offer contrasting front and rear views of a nude Venus, thus allowing painting to compete with sculpture. This apart, contemporary accounts show the powerful effect these paintings had on male viewers. The squashed bottom of the sitting Venus here was still novel in art and considered exceptionally erotic. The Venetian critic Lodovico Dolce praised (in the Prado version) the "marvellous piece of dexterity ... in that one recognises in her hindmost parts here the distension of the flesh caused by sitting ... there is no man so sharp of sight and discernment that he does not believe when he sees her that she is alive; no one so chilled by age or so hard in his makeup that he does not feel himself growing warm and tender, and the whole of his blood stirring in his veins."

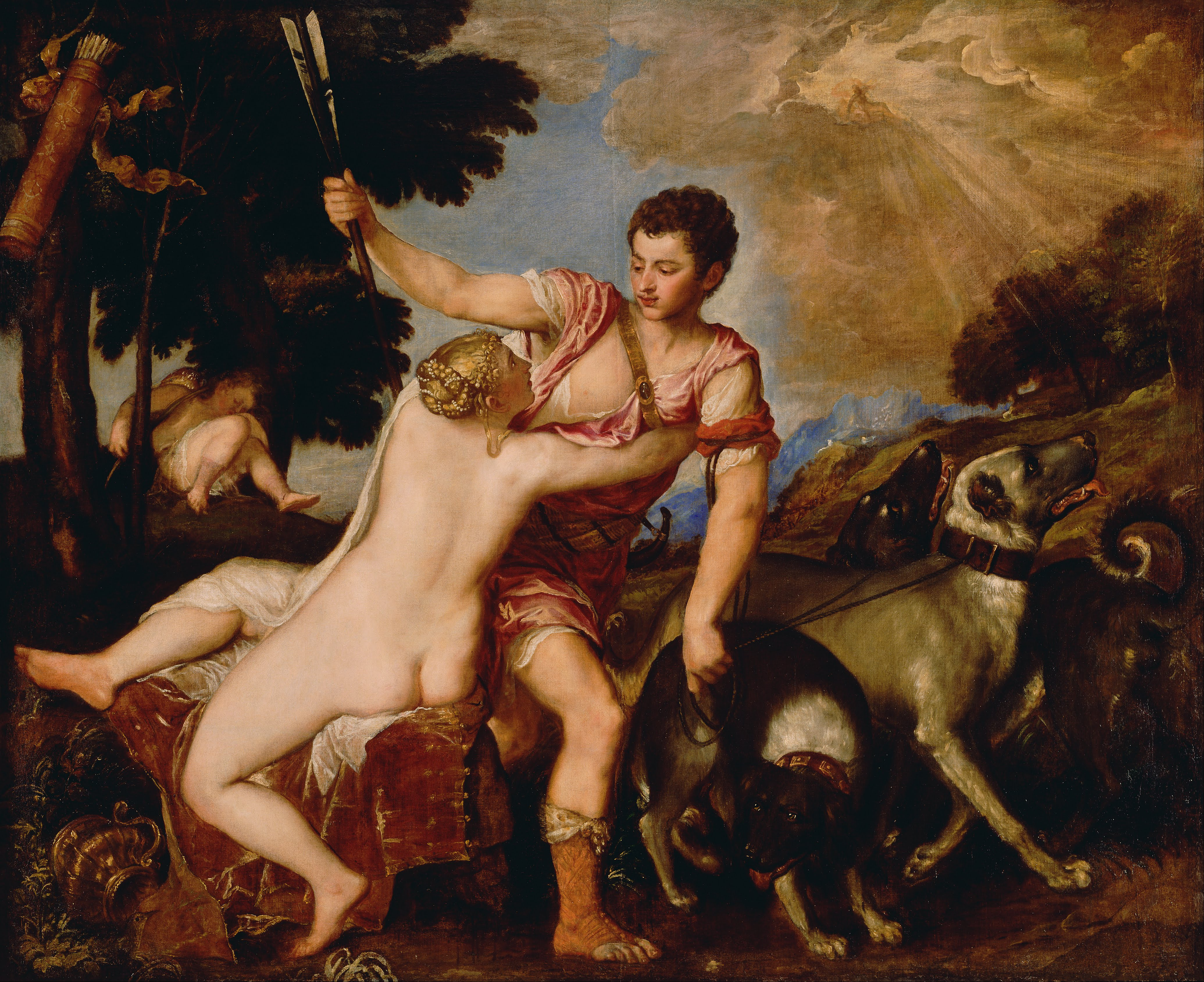
J. Paul Getty Museum, Malibu

That the female tries to physically restrain her lover from leaving her was also novel and effective, a gesture, not in any of Titian's sources, which by "transferring Venus's sense of loss at Adonis's death to his departure" brings "the two halves of the story together in a single moment of love and loss".

Writing of this and Titian's other mythological paintings from the same years, Sydney Joseph Freedberg said they "convey the sense that an extraordinary reach of classical expression has been achieved in them, as sensuous experience, as much as that of the spirit and the mind, assumes the stature of idea. ... As overt decorative virtue yields to depth of meaning in these works colour becomes quieter, but in compensation is infused by the rougher vibrance taken on by light".

=== "Lausanne version" ===
Once in a private Lausanne collection, it failed to sell at Christie's in 1998, but was offered for auction at Sotheby's in 2022, with an estimate of 8 to 12 million pounds. It had been on loan to the Ashmolean Museum, Oxford. The death of Adonis is included in the background, and the figure in the chariot in the sky is certainly Venus as it is pulled by swans, a traditional attribute. William R. (Roger) Rearick has suggested that this painting is the first version sent to Philip II of Spain in the 1550s, about whose condition Philip complained on arrival, perhaps mistaking a seam in the canvas for a fold. According to this hypothesis, the "Lausanne" painting was returned to Venice, and replaced by the version now in Madrid. Penny is unconvinced by these "extraordinary claims", seeing it as a repetition based on the London version.

It was certainly in the Orleans Collection, and was very probably before that one of the two versions in the collection of Queen Christina of Sweden in Rome, and looted by the Swedes from the collection of Rudolf II, Holy Roman Emperor in Prague Castle in 1648. After the Orleans Collection was dispersed, it belonged to the artist Benjamin West. It was then little seen in public for a long time, until in 2007 it was exhibited for at an exhibition of Titian paintings in Belluno. Soon after it was for several years on loan to the Ashmolean Museum, Oxford.

=== National Gallery, London ===
Dated c. 1554 and attributed to Titian's workshop, although the master himself may have done the "bold underdrawing", and painted the head of Adonis and Venus' hair.

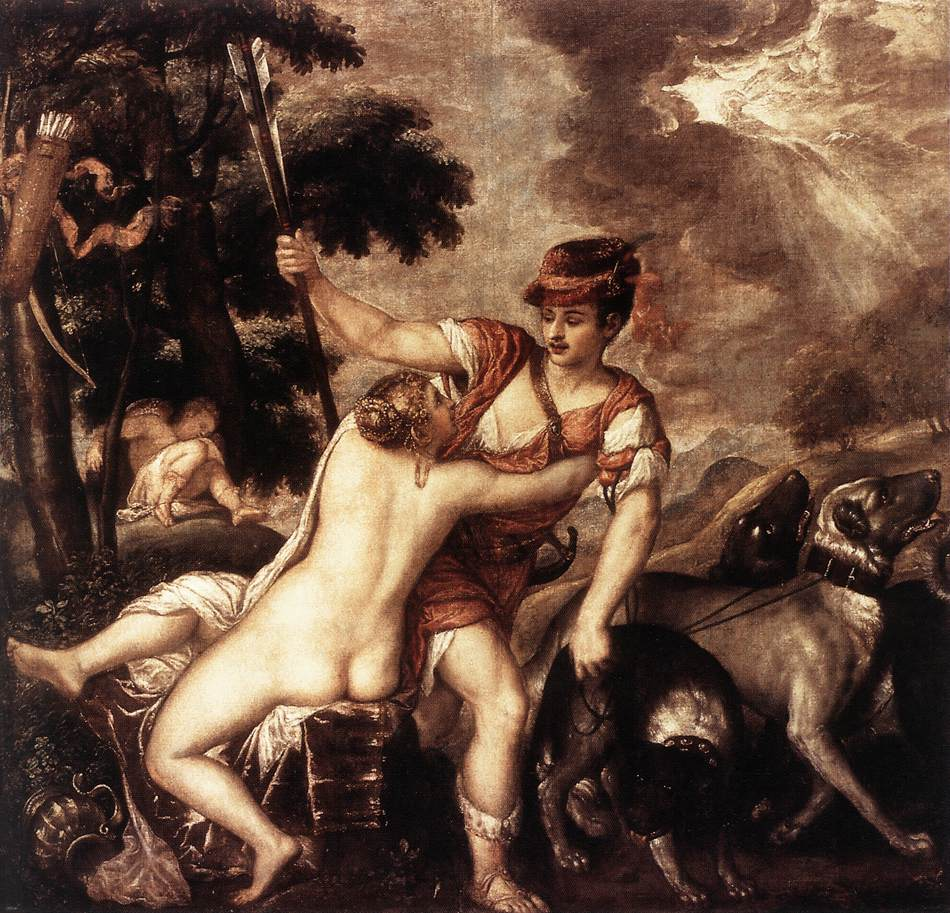
Galleria Nazionale d'Arte Antica, Rome

Penny proposes that it was the "studio model" kept in Venice when the Prado version was sent to Madrid, and including minor improvements to the composition, which can then be seen being followed in later versions (of the Prado type), that were made by copying it. These would include the Getty, Lausanne and Rome versions, which have the main features in sufficiently identical positions to the London version to have been traced from it, which would not have worked from the Prado version. But the composition continued to develop and there are details and similarities between the Prado and London versions which are not shared by others. These include the following: Adonis has no undergarment covering his shoulder and upper arm (to the right); Venus does not sit on a white cloth; the mouth of the vessel faces away from the viewer. Conversely, examples of details not in the Prado version, but in the London and other versions are the string of pearls in Venus' hair, and a larger gap between Adonis' face and the strap over his chest.

It cannot be traced back further than the Salviati collection in the 17th century. It was one of thirty-eight paintings from John Julius Angerstein's collection acquired by the British government in 1824 for £57,000 which formed the original nucleus of the National Gallery.

=== J. Paul Getty Museum, Malibu ===
The version in the J. Paul Getty Museum, is dated to 1555–60. The museum attribute it to Titian, though others are not so sure. Penny sees it as a workshop replica based on the London version, but "a good case could be made for his intervention" in places, such as "the painting of the tremulous lights" on the cloth Venus sits on.

Its provenance begins in an inventory of 1648 in Genoa, and then includes Christina, Queen of Sweden and the Orleans Collection. Like most of the collection, it was bought by a consortium in London after the French Revolution. It was selected by a member of the consortium, Frederick Howard, 5th Earl of Carlisle, as part of his share, although he did not keep it long. From 1844 to 1991 it was in the collection of successive Earls of Normanton and relatives. The museum acquired the painting in 1992.

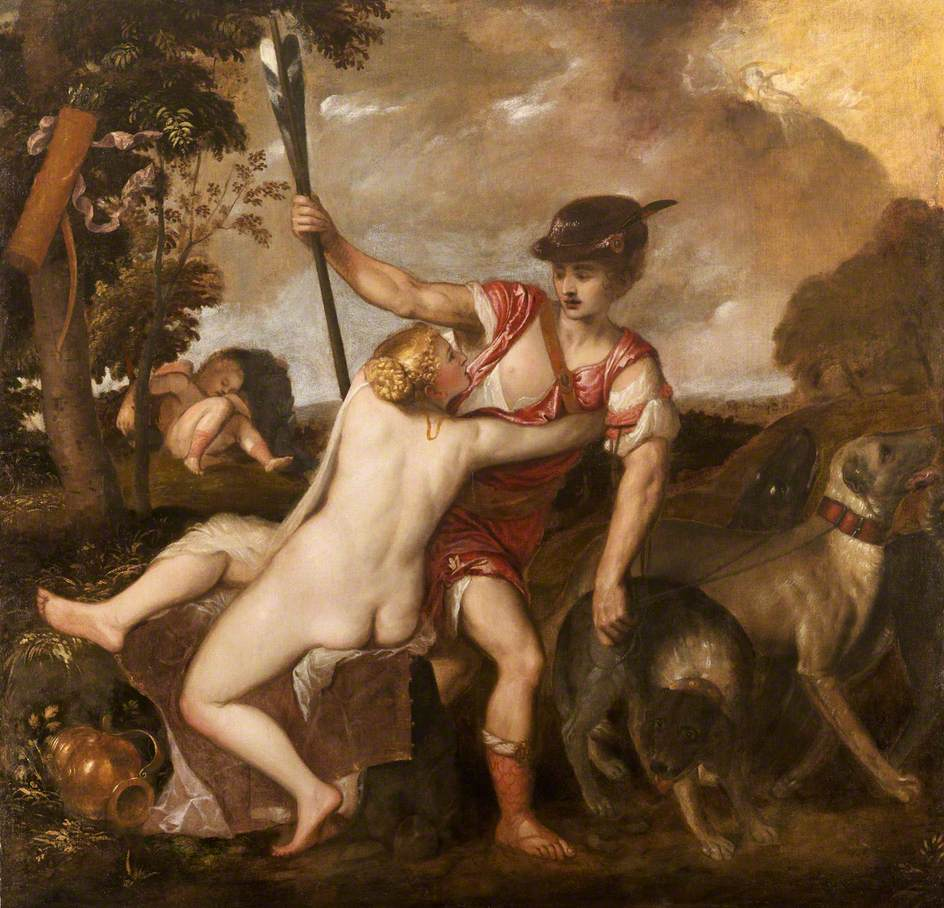
The Dulwich version, with hat, by Titian's workshop.

=== Galleria Nazionale d'Arte Antica, Rome ===
The Galleria Nazionale d'Arte Antica (Palazzo Barberini) in Rome has a version supposedly executed around 1560. It gives Adonis a jaunty hat with a feather which is also seen in the Dulwich version below, and a reduced (much smaller) version at Alnwick Castle, once thought to be Titian's modello, an idea now discounted. The Titian scholar Harold Wethey called the hat "ridiculous" and "preposterous", and considered Titian had no hand in the Rome version, a "mediocre school piece".

According to Nicholas Penny this was "almost certainly" not one of the two versions in the collection of Queen Christina of Sweden in Rome, as is often claimed. He says these are the "Lausanne version" and the Getty version. It was owned by the Russian emperor Paul I. It returned to Italy from Saint Petersburg thanks to the Venetian merchant Pietro Concolo, to be eventually bought by the Roman Giovanni Torlonia, 1st Prince of Civitella-Cesi. In 1862 it was acquired by the collection of Palazzo Barberini, now the Galleria Nazionale d'Arte Antica.

=== Dulwich Picture Gallery, London ===
Another version with the hat. The museum says: "Recent conservation work has enabled us to confirm that rather than being a late 17th-century copy, this painting is very likely to have been made in Titian's workshop in the second half of the 16th century." It is dated 1554–1576, and has been in the museum since 1811.

=== Other versions ===
At least one other version may well be from Titian's workshop. One was long at Rokeby Park and sold at Christie's on 10 July 2003, going to a private collection, perhaps to that owned by the Cobbe family. It is now preserved at Hatchlands Park in Surrey, a National Trust property, on loan from the Cobbe Collection. It was confirmed as a fully authograph work, used by Titian as a preparatory model for the version sent to Philip II. This has been damaged and overpainted, but might have been another version kept as a studio model, as with the London version. A version in a Moscow private collection said to date from 1542–46 has recently been promoted from status as a copy, and would represent the earliest known version of the Prado type, from some ten years earlier.

== Farnese type versions ==
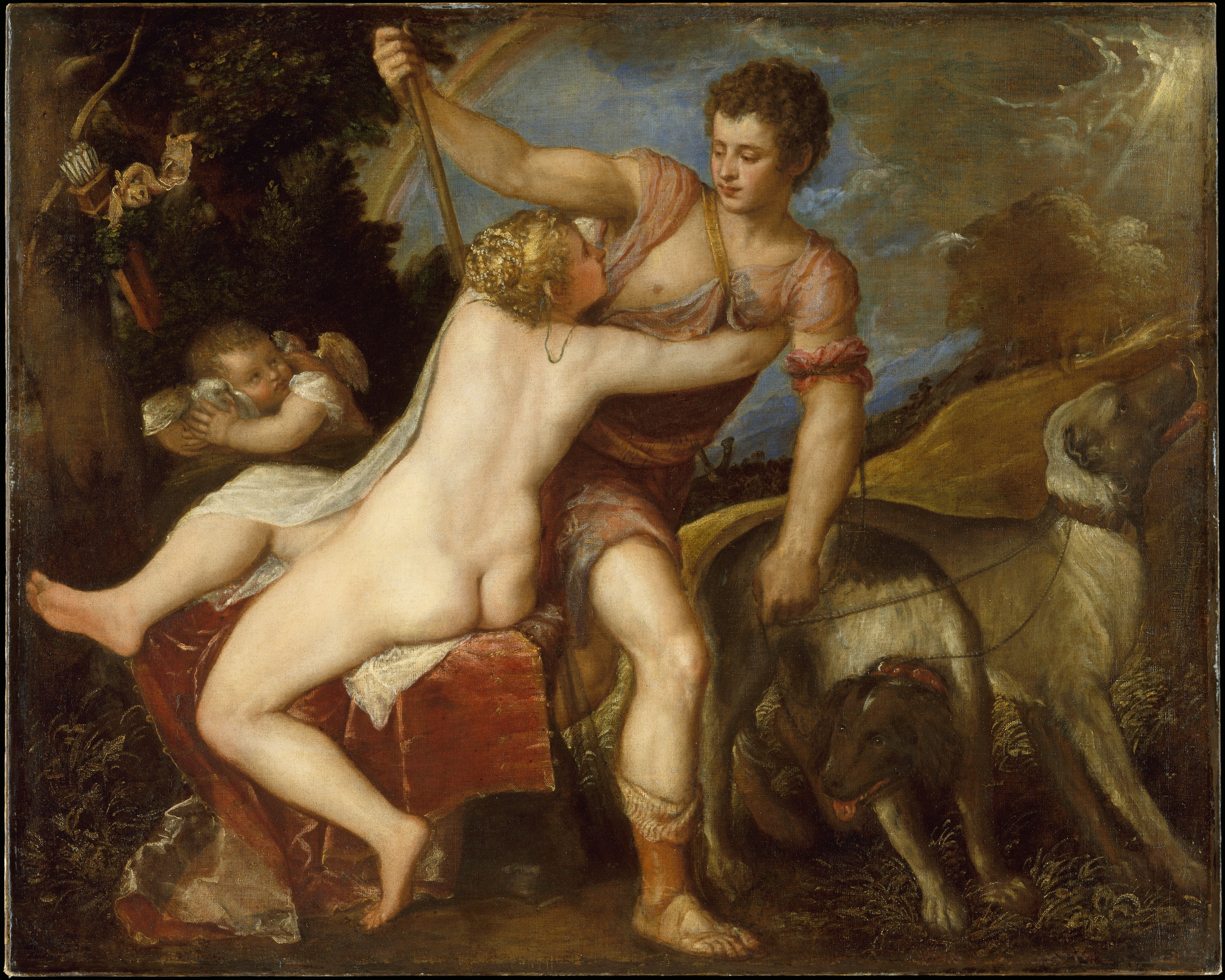
Metropolitan Museum of Art, a Farnese type.

The Farnese type is named after a painting once in the Farnese Collection and then the royal collection in Naples but now lost, or lost sight of. However it is known from a "very careful drawing" (1762) and subsequent engraving (1769) by Robert Strange. See above for the differences to the Prado version. It is often thought that this was the earlier of the two types, possibly originating in the 1520s, although the matter is not certain, and it seems clear that both types continued to be produced until late in Titian's career, and developing details in the Prado type composition appear in Farnese versions.

The National Gallery has a small Boy with a Bird which is effectively the detail of Cupid, except lacking his wings. This used to be thought to be 17th-century, but is now attributed to Titian's workshop, or even Titian himself, and to date from relatively early, probably the 1520s.

=== National Gallery of Art, Washington ===
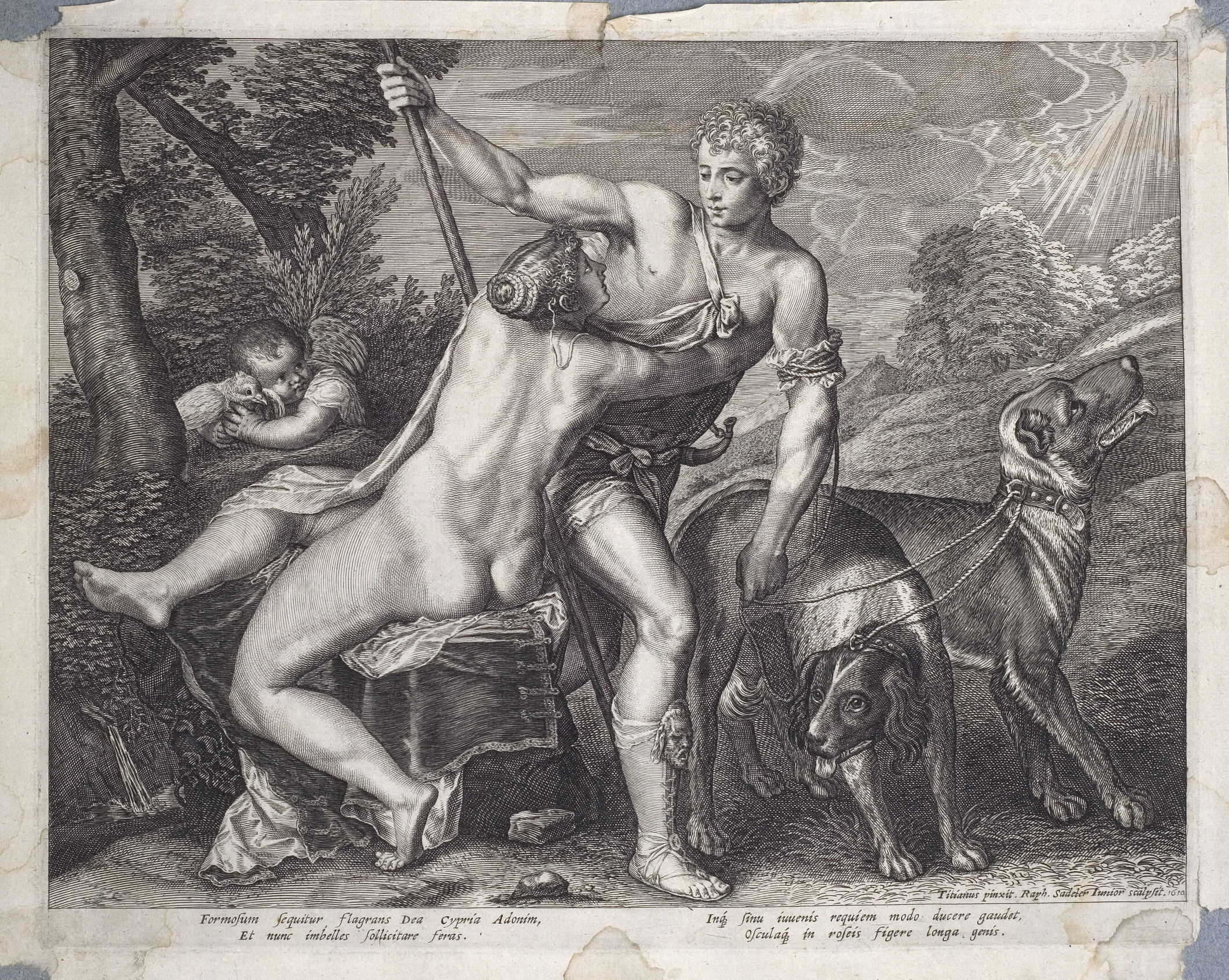
Engraving by Raphael Sadeler II, 1610, based on Washington.

Dated c. 1560, and attributed by them to Titian. To Penny it seems "largely autograph" (by Titian himself), and from the various differences in detail he suggests it was "planned, if not painted, at the same time as [the Prado version, that is 1554] or perhaps a little earlier". It was engraved by Raphael Sadeler II in 1610. Alone among the versions described here, a small spring or stream falls to the left of the figures. Owned by Anne Russell Digby, wife of George Digby, 2nd Earl of Bristol, it was inherited by the Spencer family in 1685, in whose hands it remained until 1924. It was then sold to various British and American art dealers, and acquired in 1942 by the National Gallery of Art.

=== Metropolitan Museum of Art, New York ===
The Metropolitan Museum of Art in New York has a Farnese type version, with minor differences, of which they say: "This version was painted at the end of his career and its high quality shows that it was carried out by the artist himself." Penny thinks that it is "partly" by Titian. It was formerly in the collection of the Earls of Darnley.

== Origin of the composition ==
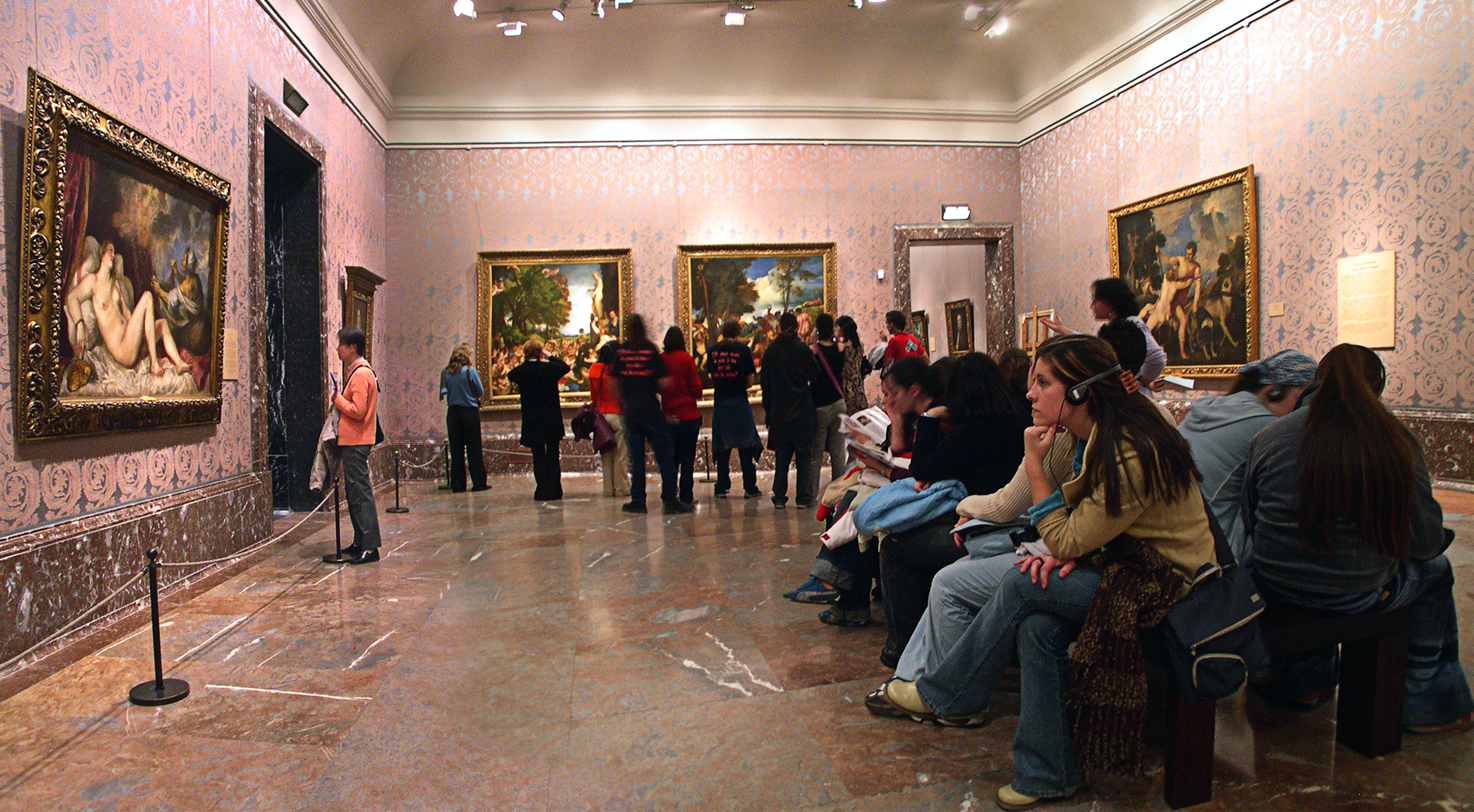
Titian paintings on display in the Museo del Prado (from left to right: Danaë and the Shower of Gold, The Worship of Venus, Bacchanal of the Andrians, and Venus and Adonis)

Although the best surviving examples of the Farnese or two-dog type appear to be at least as late as the Prado type, it may be that this was the original composition. Paul Joannides has suggested this, hypothesising that the original lost Farnese painting, or yet another version, may date back to the 1520s or even earlier. It is conceded that the tighter composition is more dramatic, and the "extended" left side of the Prado type has been described as "confusing" in all versions, the "pose and position" of the new third hound at the rear "complicated and difficulty to decipher", and the whole "clumsy as an arrangement".

Evidence of the possible earliest version is a miniature painting on parchment at Burleigh House by the English portrait miniaturist Peter Oliver of a lost version owned by Thomas Howard, 21st Earl of Arundel. It is dated 1631 and was painted for Charles I of England. In this composition, broadly of the Farnese type, Adonis does not hold a spear but has his arm around Venus. The original Howard painting seems to have been one destroyed in Vienna in 1945, and known only from black and white photographs. It was never catalogued as by Titian himself at Vienna, and was probably a studio copy of a lost original. Details of the forms and colours in these copies suggest Titian's style from the 1520s or late 1510s, and it is suggested that they record a first rendering of the subject from this period.

The increased size may have been dictated by King Philip. We know that Philip's version was intended as a pair with his version of the Danaë, which was also a changed and extended version of a subject first painted for the Farnese (the version now in Naples). The height of the Naples Danaë is the same as that recorded for the lost Farnese Venus and Adonis.

The pose of Venus had precedents in a well-known classical relief called il letto di Polyclito (the Bed of Polyclitus), where the female is Psyche (though in the 16th century thought to be Venus with Vulcan). She sits on a bed containing her sleeping partner, and twists round to see him, supporting herself on the bed with one arm, and lifting the covers with the other. Titian had various opportunities to see versions or copies of this very well-known composition. It had already been used by Raphael's workshop in their frescos in the Villa Farnesina in Rome, for Hebe in the Feast of the Gods. Giulio Romano had used it in the Palazzo del Tè in Mantua, for a Bacchus and Ariadne. Titian rarely comes so close to quoting another work.

Like other painters at various periods, Titian was often receptive to requests for repetitions of earlier compositions of various types. A number of his mythological nudes were copied especially often. There are at least five versions from him or his workshop of the Danaë, also falling into two main types, one first painted for the Farnese and the other for Philip II. Venus and Musician is another nude subject with several versions, in two main types, one with an organist and one with a lutenist. Venus is accompanied on her pillows either by a lapdog (of differing species) or a cupid.

== In literature ==
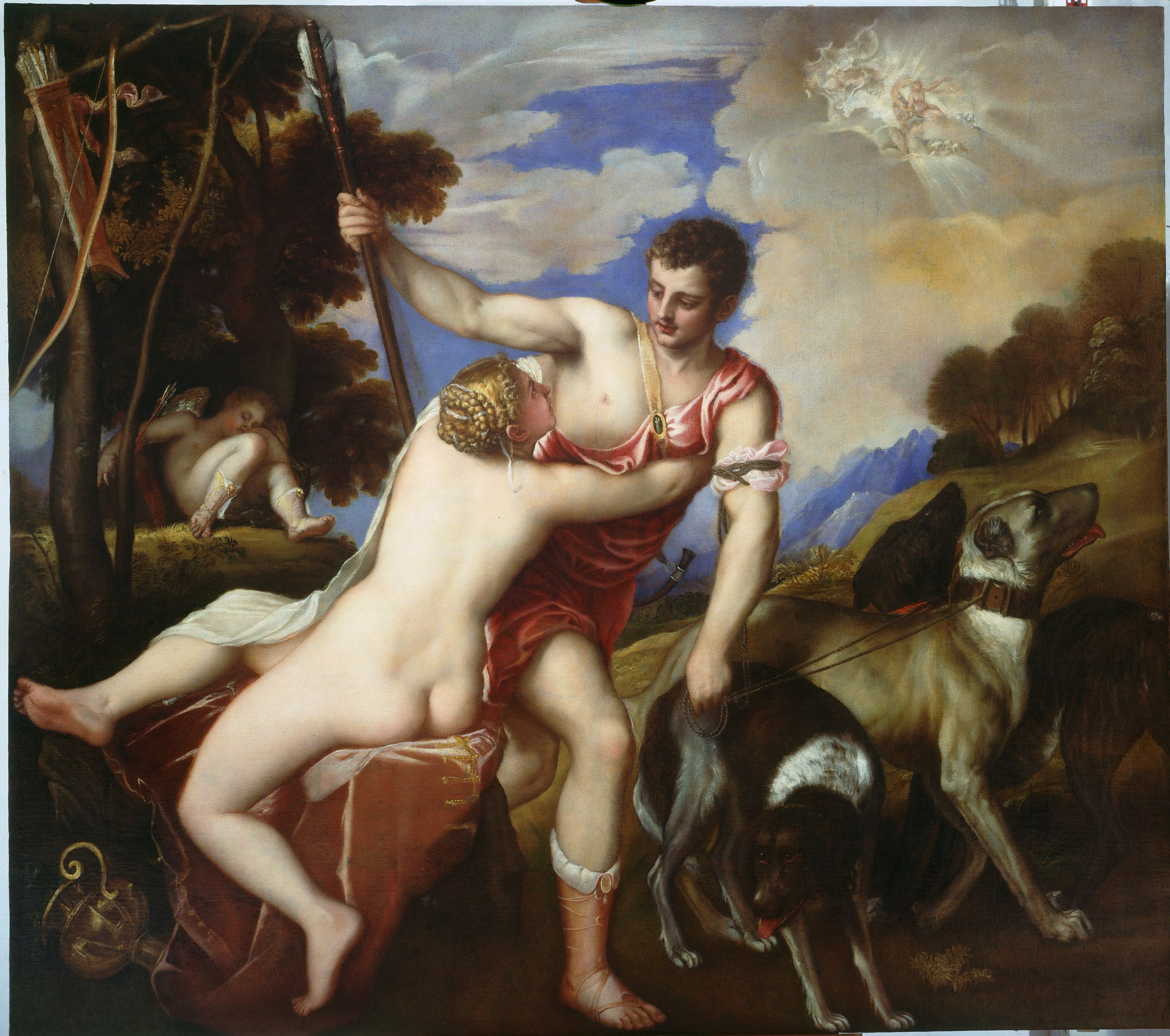
Moscow version, said to be 1542–46

The Spanish dramatist Lope de Vega (1562–1635) was "fascinated" by the painting, and mentions it in several plays, with a print of it featuring as a stage prop in one of them.

Venus and Adonis is a narrative poem by William Shakespeare that was published in 1593 and is probably Shakespeare's first publication. As noted by Erwin Panofsky, the poem has similarities with Titian's painting, general ones in that Venus has difficulty attracting the very young Adonis, and the specific detail of Venus trying to physically restrain him from going hunting, as in the Titian.

== Possible timeline ==
Summarizing the complicated history of the versions above, a possible timeline is:

- 1518 to 1520s: National Gallery Boy with a Dove.
- mid-1520s: Putative lost original of the Farnese type, with no spear.
- 1542–46: Newly promoted Moscow version, if so the first of the Prado type
- mid-1540s: Lost version for the Farneses.
- 1554: Prado version for Philip of Spain, with London and Hatchlands versions around the same time. Penny suggests that the Washington and Metropolitan Farnese versions date from little after, in that order.
- 1554 to 1560 or later: Lausanne, Getty, Rome, and Dulwich versions.

== Titian's poesie series for Philip II ==
- Danaë, delivered to Philip 1553, now Wellington Collection, with earlier and later versions.
- Venus and Adonis, Museo del Prado, delivered 1554, and several other versions
- The Rape of Europa, c. 1560–1562, Isabella Stewart Gardner Museum
- Diana and Actaeon, 1556–1559, owned jointly by London's National Gallery and the National Gallery of Scotland in Edinburgh
- Diana and Callisto, 1556–1559, owned jointly by London's National Gallery and the National Gallery of Scotland in Edinburgh
- Perseus and Andromeda, Wallace Collection, c. 1553–1562
- The Death of Actaeon, National Gallery, never delivered and not always counted in the series, c. 1559 onwards
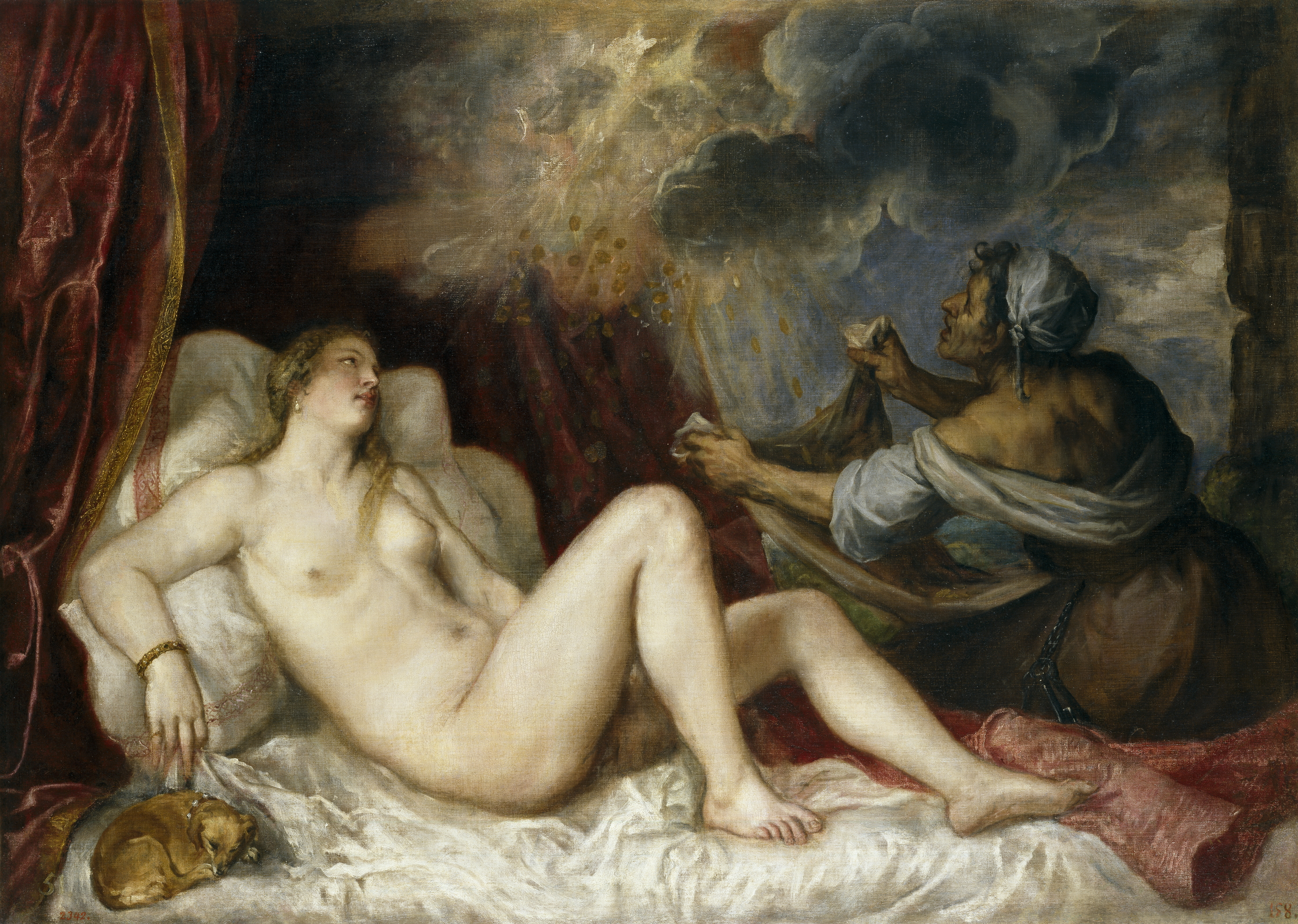
Danaë

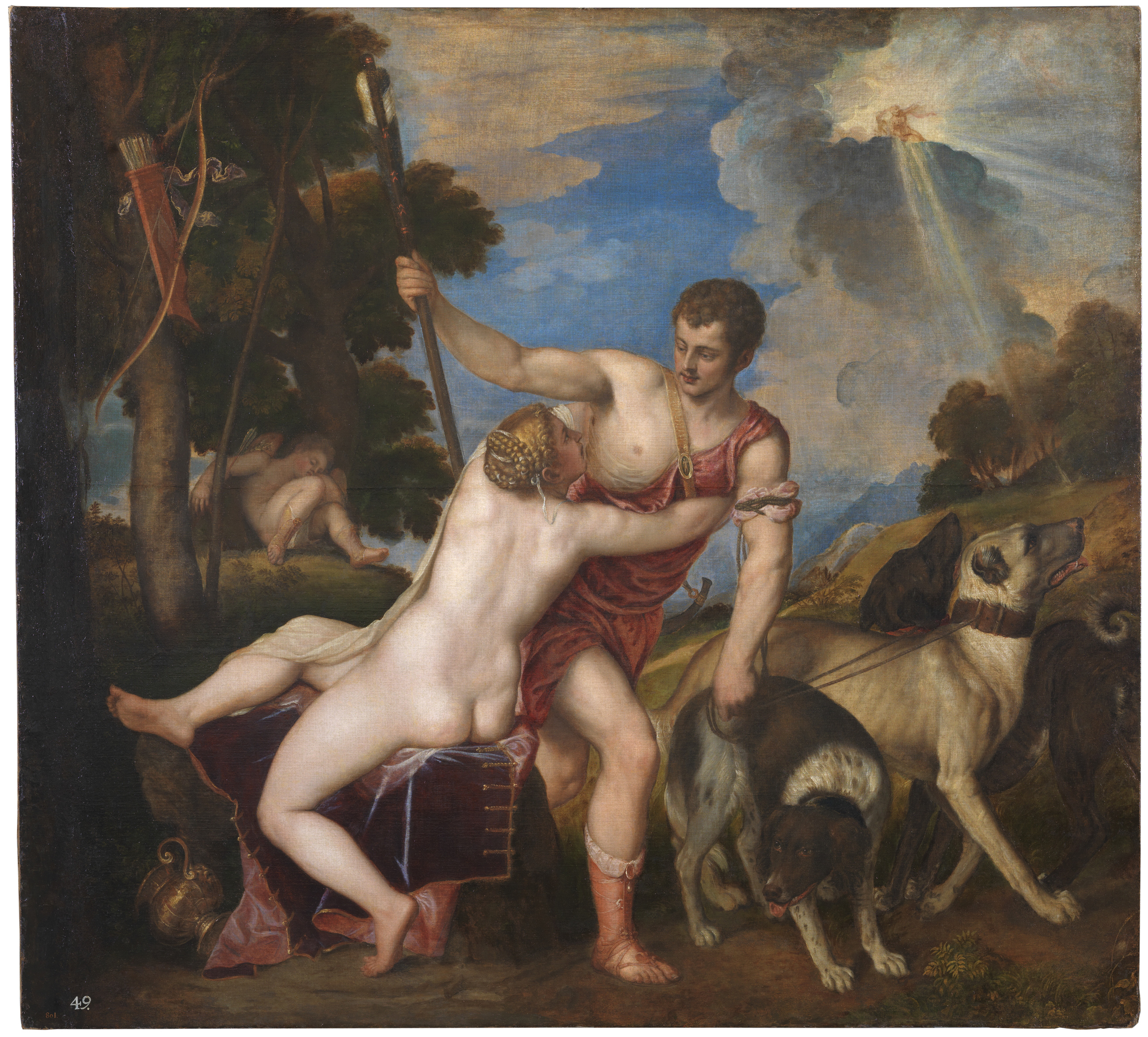
Venus and Adonis

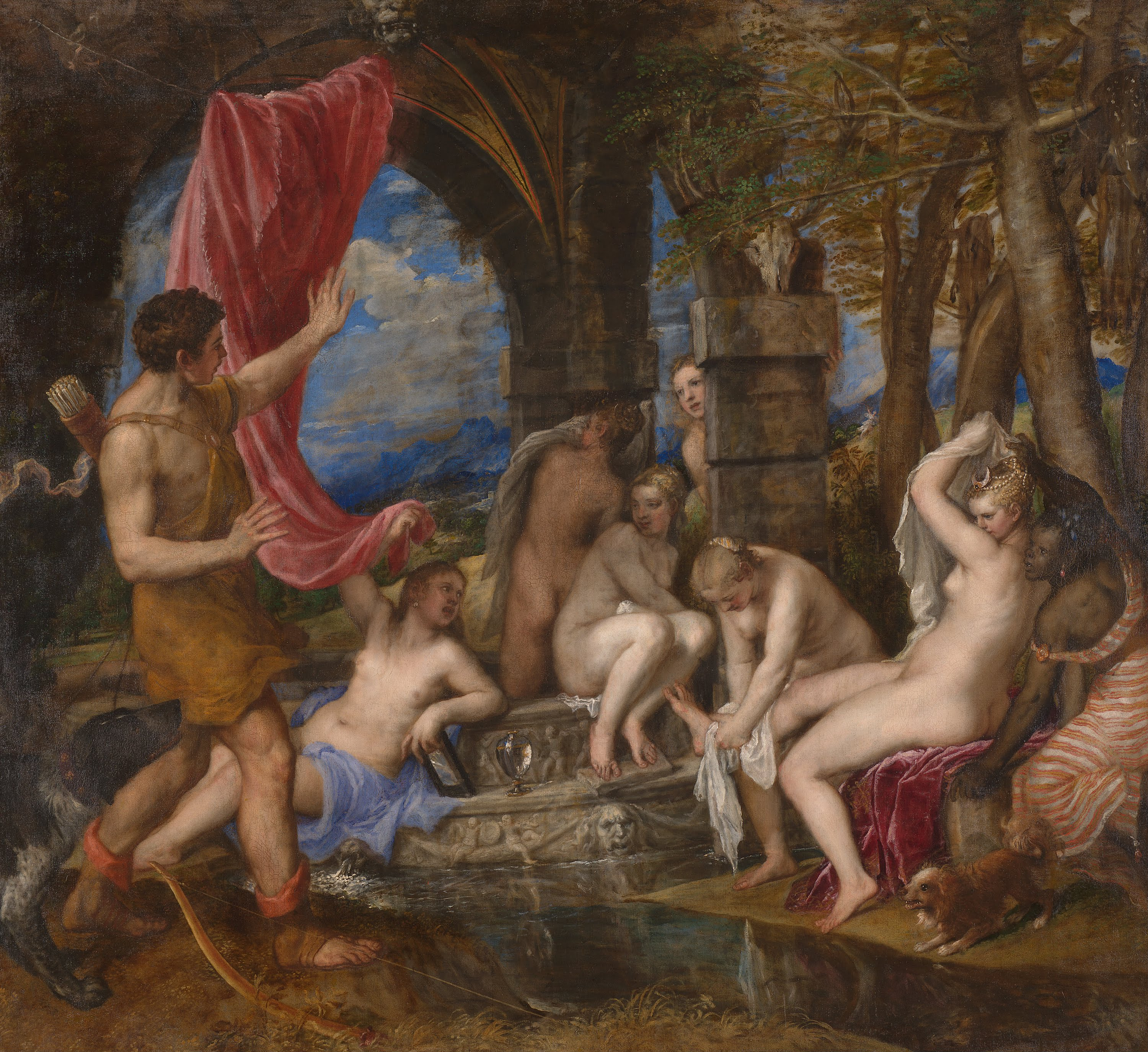
Diana and Actaeon

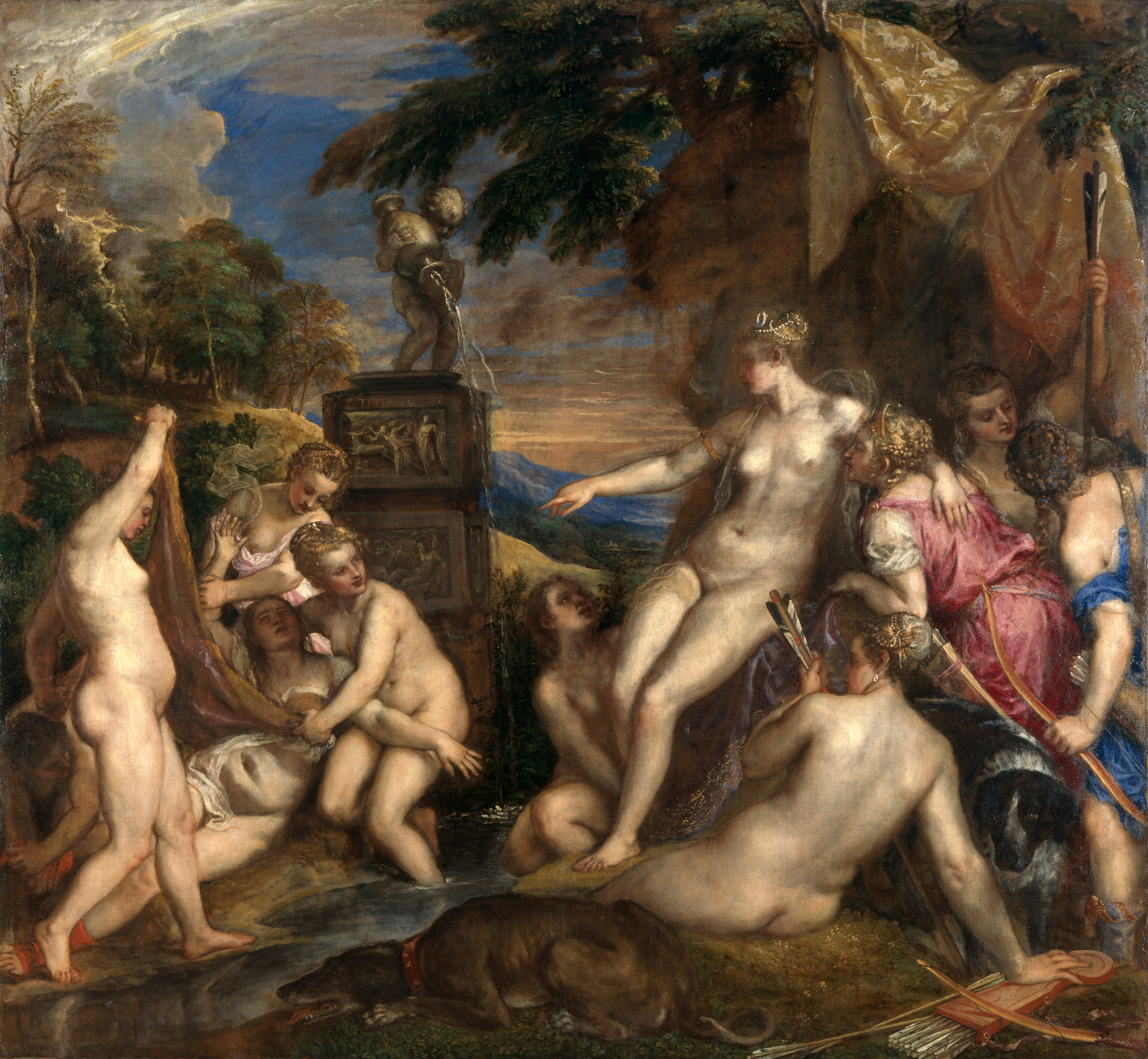
Diana and Callisto

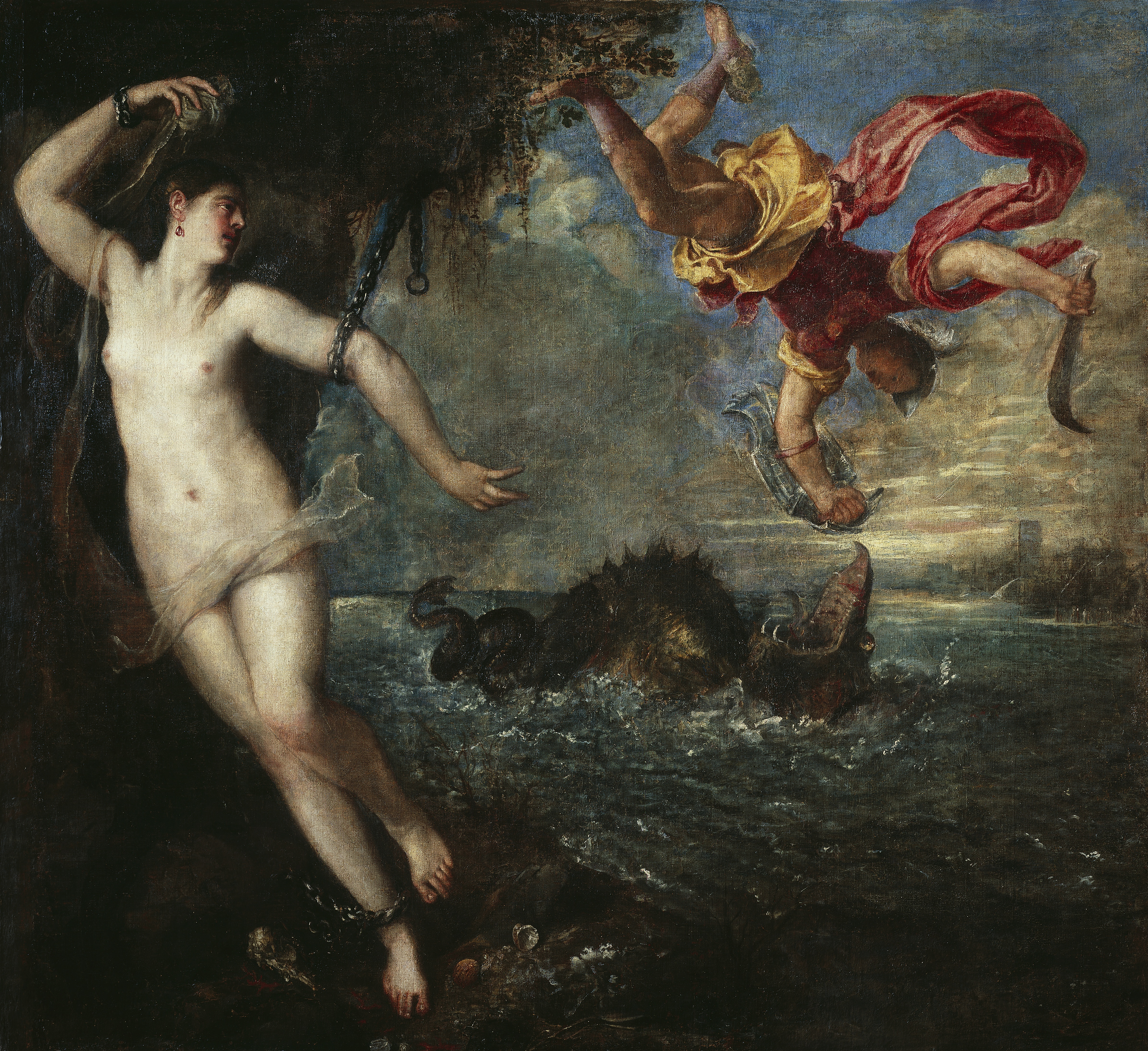
Perseus and Andromeda

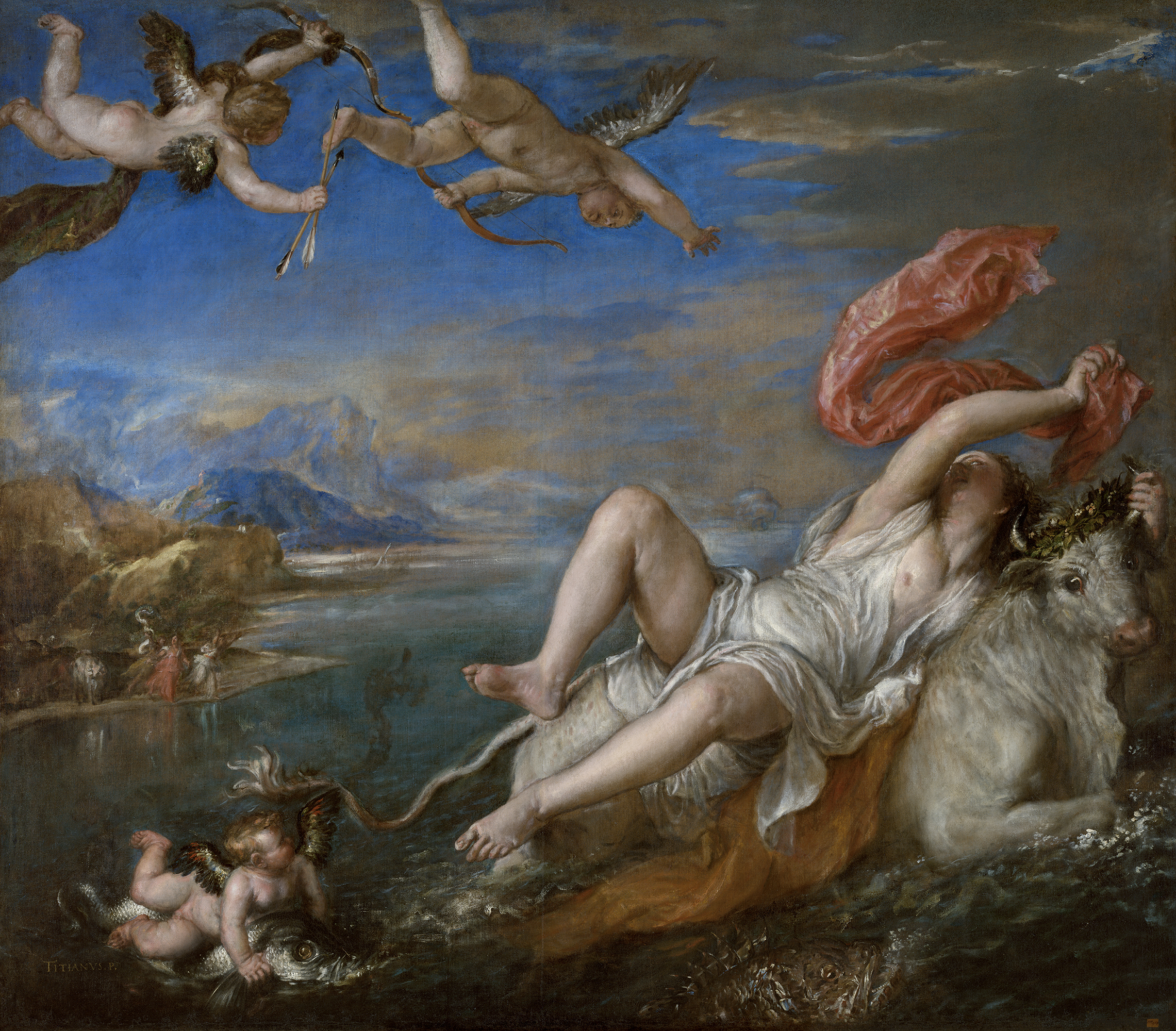
The Rape of Europa

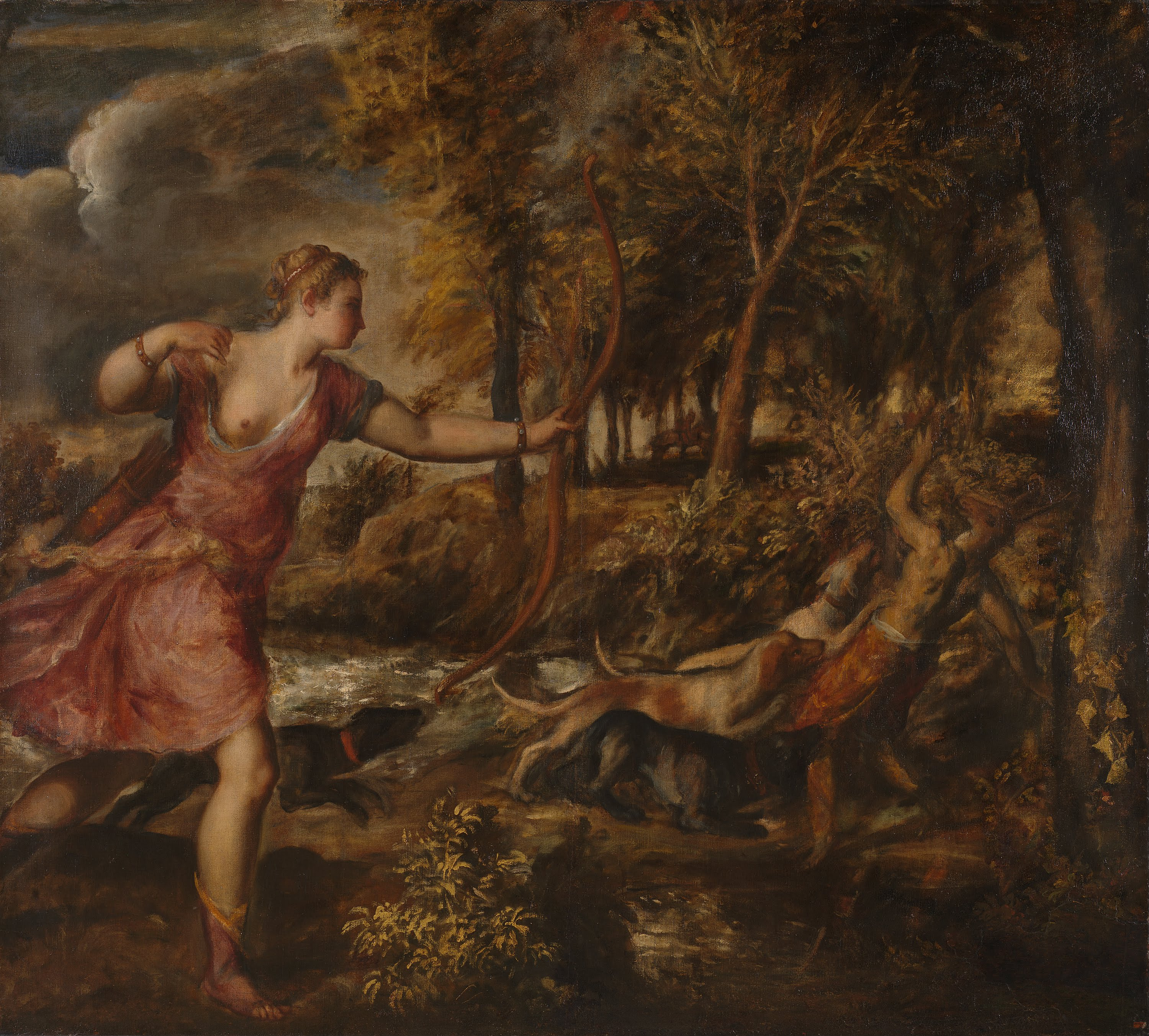
The Death of Actaeon

== See also ==
- List of works by Titian
