= Danaë (Titian paintings) =

Several paintings by Titian

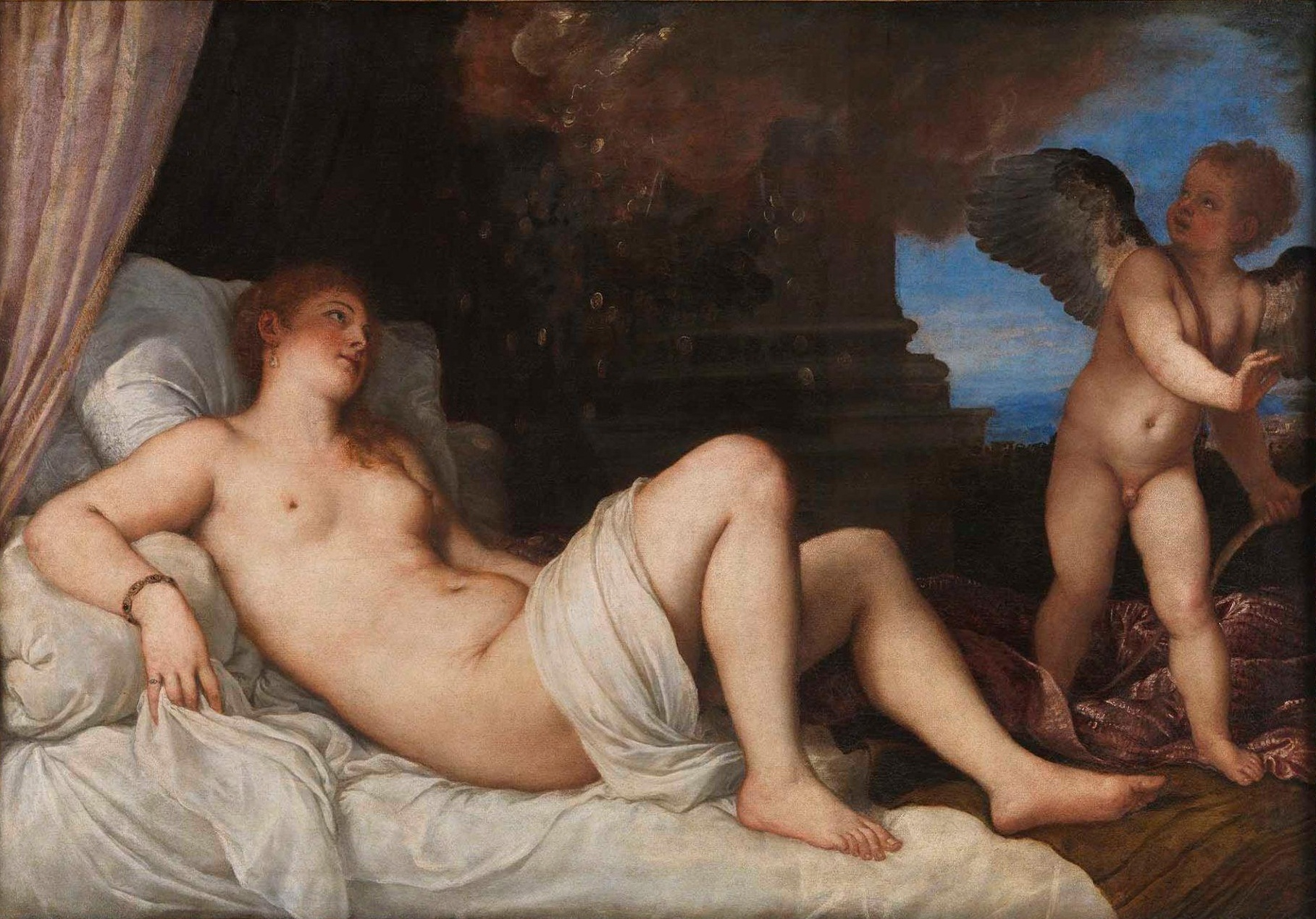
- Artist: Titian
- Year: 1544–46
- Medium: oil on canvas
- Dimensions: 120 cm × 172 cm (47 in × 68 in)
- Location: National Museum of Capodimonte, Naples

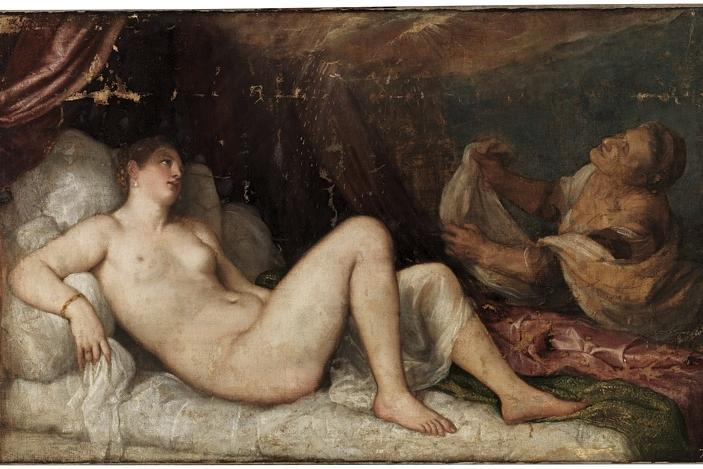
The Wellington Collection (London) version, now agreed to be the one sent to Philip II of Spain. Before restoration. Here, an aged maid has replaced Cupid, while the cloth covering Danaë's upper thigh is absent, leaving her naked.

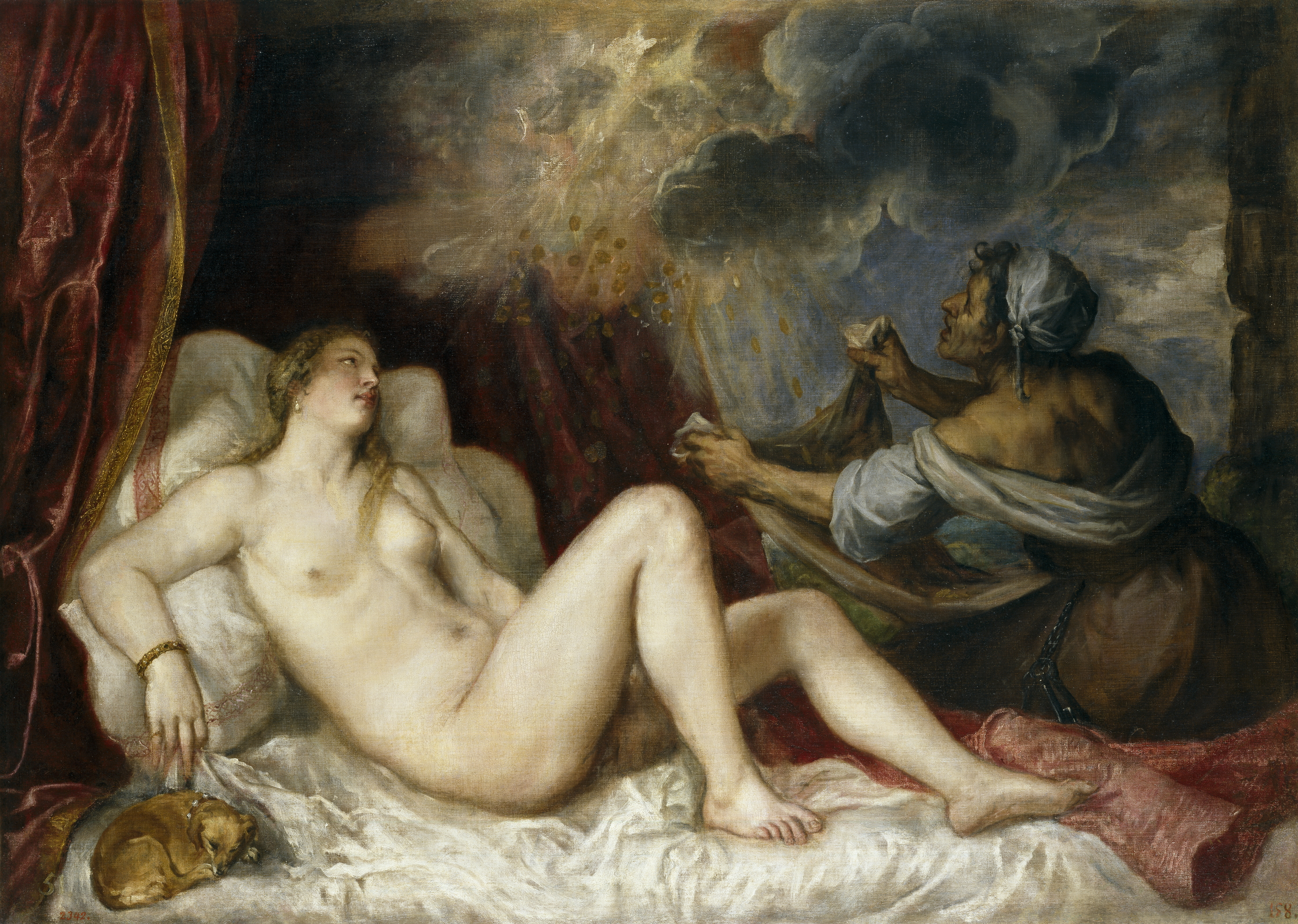
Danaë with Nursemaid or Danaë Receiving the Golden Rain, 1560s. 129 cm × 180 cm. Museo del Prado, Madrid

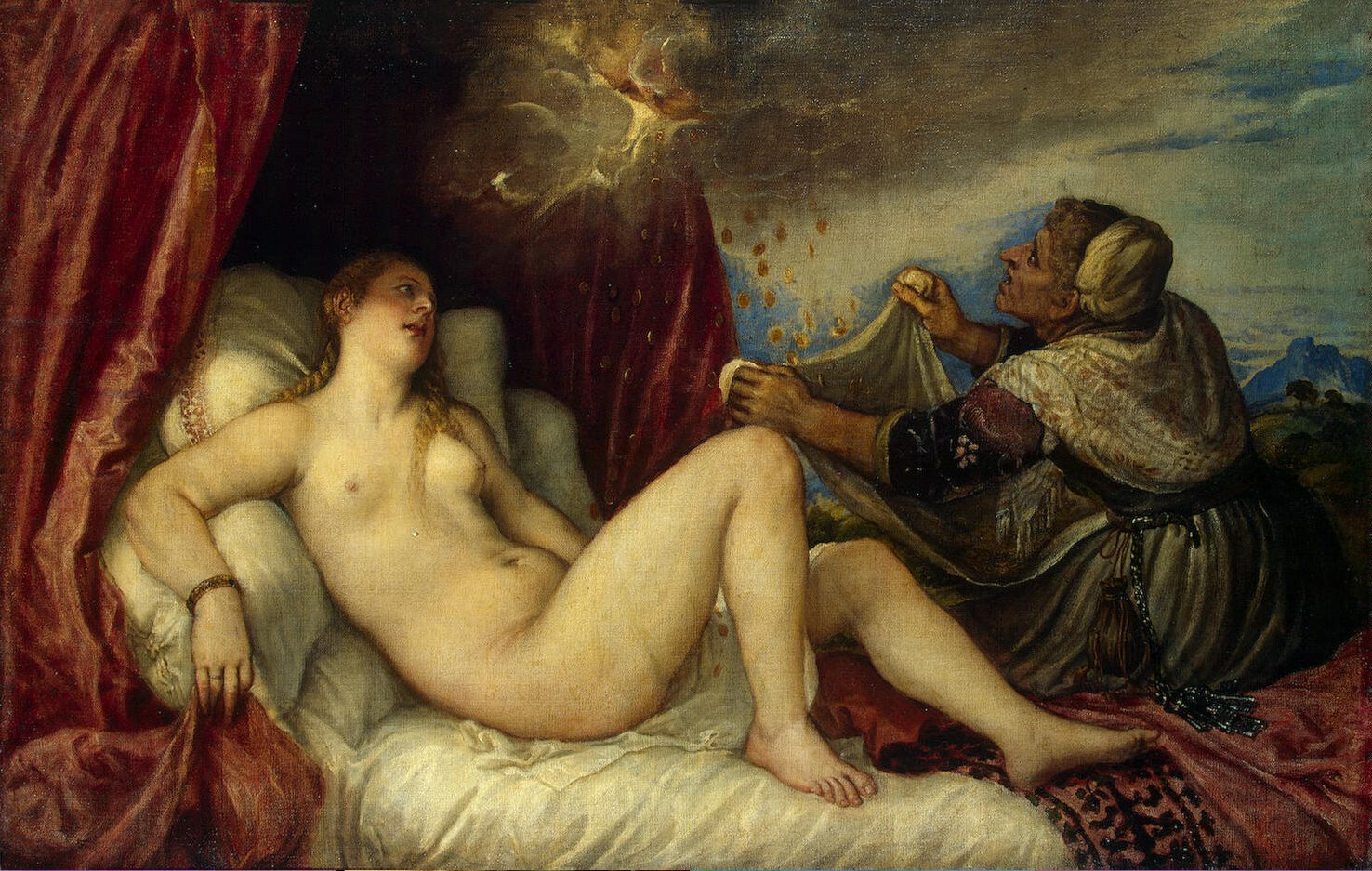
Titian, 1553–1554, Hermitage Museum, Saint Petersburg. Here the figures are closer together, and Jupiter's face can be seen in the cloud.

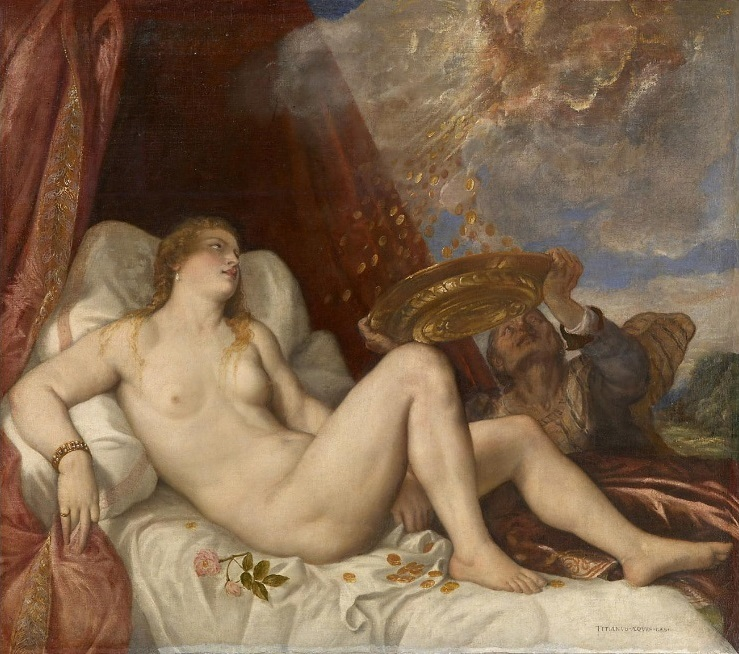
Titian and workshop, 1564. Kunsthistorisches Museum, Vienna. That there was large input from Titian's workshop is revealed by the heavier treatment of Danaë's skin-tone and body as well as the hanging drapery

The Venetian painter Titian and his workshop made at least six versions of the same composition showing Danaë (or Danaë and the Shower of Gold), painted between about 1544 and the 1560s. The scene is based on the mythological princess Danaë, as – very briefly – recounted by the Roman poet Ovid, and at greater length by Boccaccio. She was isolated in a bronze tower following a prophecy that her firstborn would eventually kill her father. Although aware of the consequences, Danaë was seduced and became pregnant by Zeus (in Roman mythology Jupiter), who, inflamed by lust, descended from Mount Olympus to seduce her in the form of a shower of gold.

Though the composition, especially the main figure, is essentially the same, the six or more versions vary considerably. The major surviving versions are in Naples, London, Madrid, Vienna, Chicago, and St. Petersburg. The voluptuous figure of Danaë, with legs half spread, hardly changes, and was probably traced from a studio drawing or version. Her bed and its hangings are another constant. Other elements vary considerably; the first version, now in Naples, was painted between 1544–46, and is the only one with a figure of Cupid at the right, rather than an old woman catching the shower of gold. She is a different figure at each appearance, though the pose in the Hermitage follows the Prado version. The small dog resting at Danaë's side in the Prado and Chicago versions is generally absent.

The works influenced the compositions of many artists including Rembrandt, Anthony van Dyck and Gustav Klimt, who all painted versions of the scene. Giorgio Vasari recounts a visit with Michelangelo to Titian's studio, where they saw the original in progress. Michelangelo praised Titian's use of colour in the Madrid painting, though later, in private, he was critical of Titian's draftsmanship.

== Legend of Danaë ==
According to Greek mythology, as it would have been known to Titian through Ovid's Metamorphoses, Boccaccio's Genealogia Deorum Gentilium, and probably Terence, when her father Acrisius consulted the oracle on how he would get male children, he was told that his daughter would bear a son who would kill him. Acrisius then locked up and guarded his daughter Danaë in a subterranean dungeon, or alternatively a windowless tower room – a detail Titian ignores in most versions, giving a view at least to the sky on the right of the picture. Danaë, aware of the consequences, allowed herself to be seduced and impregnated by Zeus, who broke through the defences by appearing in the form of a shower of gold, which in ancient times had already been envisaged as a shower of gold coins, and the myth taken as a metaphor for prostitution, although the parallels with conventional depictions of the Annunciation were also part of Renaissance awareness.

When Acrisius learned of Danaë's son Perseus, he refused to believe Zeus's role, and cast mother and child adrift at sea in a chest. They landed at Seriphus, where Perseus was raised by Dictys. Perseus eventually fulfilled the prophecy by killing Acrisius years after – although accidentally. Danaë was seen in the Middle Ages and Renaissance as a symbol of the corrupting effect of wealth, which could taint even feminine beauty or moral virtue.

== Series ==
Danaë's pose is consistent throughout the various versions. She is naked or with a draped thigh, lying on a couch with her knees raised and her legs half-parted. The painting is a development of Titian's compositions with a reclining female nude in the Venetian style. After Giorgione's death in 1510, Titian completed his Dresden Venus, which began the tradition, and around 1534 painted the Venus of Urbino. Kenneth Clark sees the Danaë as Titian adopting the conventions for the nude prevailing outside Venice; "in the rest of Italy bodies of an entirely different shape had long been fashionable". The many versions of the Venus and Musician (1540s onwards) retain the smooth curves of the Venetian convention, here plump as a seal.

According to Clark, the pose is "clearly based on drawings of Michelangelo, and is in fact similar to that of the Night, reversed and opened out.... At every point Michelangelo's grandiose invention has been transformed from an embodiment of spiritual malaise into an embodiment of physical satisfaction". George Bull suggests as sources Primaticcio's painting of the subject at the Chateau of Fontainebleau, which Titian probably knew from a print, and Correggio's Danaë (c. 1531).

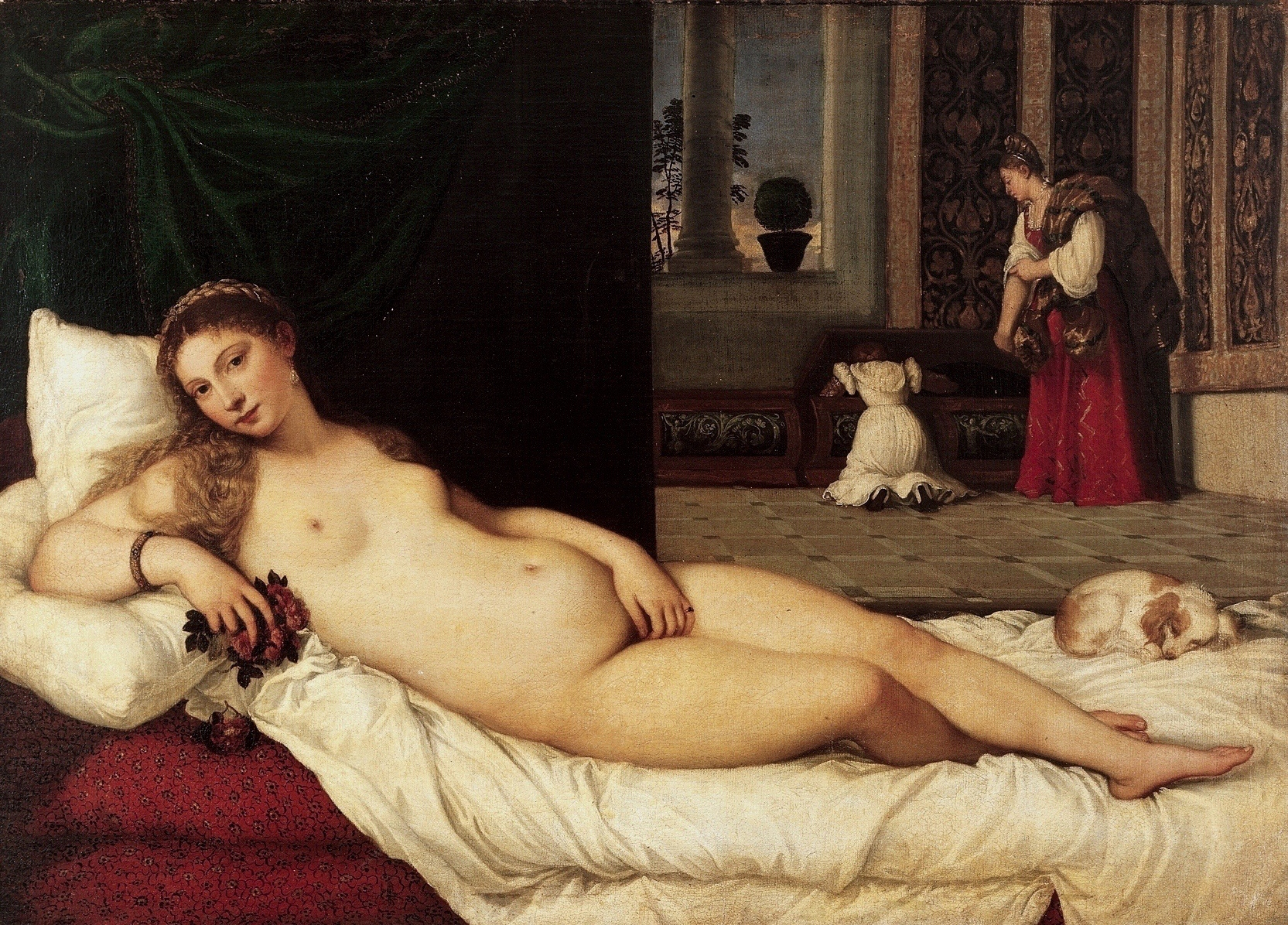
Titian's Venus of Urbino, 1538. Uffizi, Florence, Titian's famous earlier reclining nude.

After the original in Naples, where Cupid is to her right, he is replaced by an elderly maid, holding out a cloth or dish to catch the gold coins spilling down from an explosion of colour in the sky which represents Zeus. This figure is retained in later versions (except for Chicago), though changing in pose, appearance and action. It allows "a series of sophisticated counterpoints: youth versus old age; beauty versus loyalty; a nude figure versus a dressed figure". Her undoubted unattractiveness, pronounced in some versions, draws attention by comparison to the beauty of Danaë. In at least some versions, she also matches the conventional appearance in art of a "procuress" (as art historians like to call them) or brothel-keeper. The left side of each canvas is an interior, although sometimes showing a distant landscape view.

While the series freely describes desirable flesh in an overtly sexual manner, Titian transforms the motifs of courtesans and carnal desire into the more highbrow realm of classical myth.

== Original, Naples version ==
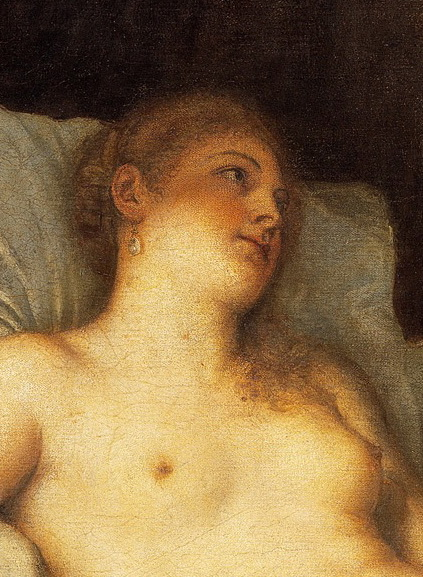
Detail of Danaë, Naples

The first version was painted in both Rome and Venice for Cardinal Alessandro Farnese, whose grandfather then reigned as Pope Paul III. The papal nuncio in Venice saw it in progress, and in September 1544 wrote cheerfully to the cardinal comparing it to Titian's earlier nude, the Venus of Urbino. He described it as looking like "a Theatine nun", that would arouse even Cardinal Tommaso Badia. At least "Theatine" is usually assumed to mean a nun, although it has been suggested that the term was also a "term of abuse to refer to any 'ultra-conservative Catholic' killjoy".

The features of Danaë, broadly retained in the later versions, are based on the cardinal's courtesan mistress Angela; Giulio Clovio had sent Titian a likeness from Rome for him to use. It seems likely that it was intended originally simply as a portrait of Farnese's mistress, possibly loosely identified as Venus by the presence of the Cupid. The Council of Trent began in December 1545 as it was being finished, and the cardinal became worried about an overt display of his affair; even though few would see the paintings in his private apartments, word would no doubt get around. The face was slightly de-individualised, and either artist or patron had the idea of turning the painting into one of Danaë.

It is the only major version where a Cupid stands at Danaë's feet, the other versions have an aged servant. Presumably once Titian introduced this in Philip II's version, he preferred it and used it thereafter. Danaë's bed seems to lie in an open loggia, or beside a large window. The base of a large classical column occupies the background of the centre of the painting, and to the right of that there is an elevated view of trees and distant hills, not very clearly defined. The settings of Titian's several versions of the Venus and Musician series, also centred on a reclining nude, are comparable. The other major Danaë versions all replace the large column with more red drapery, and (except for Chicago and St Petersburg) have an even less clearly depicted outside background, mainly of sky. The cloth over Danaë's thigh is also not seen again. The burst of light that showers coins and on which Danaë's heavy gaze falls is flanked by dark clouds that appear to be moving towards the centre of the canvas. They spill heavy rain, which falls parallel to Zeus's coins.

This version passed by descent through the Farnese family to the royal collection in Naples, and is now in the National Museum of Capodimonte, Naples.

== Philip II's version, and the Prado's ==
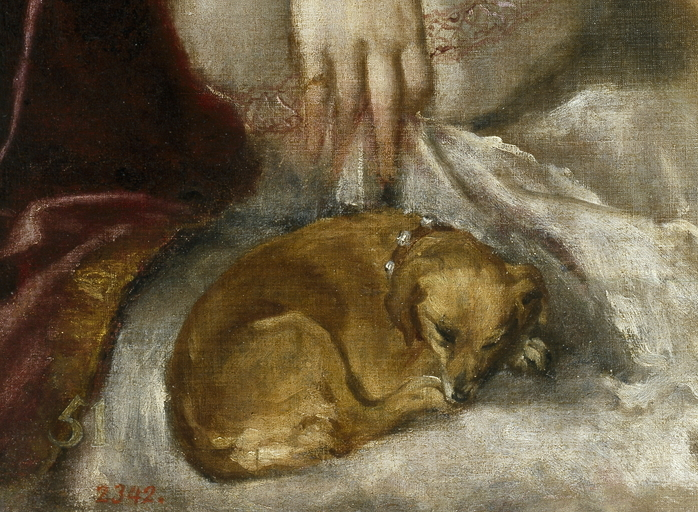
The dog in Madrid

Philip II of Spain commissioned a second version, painted in 1549–50, as the first of a series of mythological paintings described by Titian as "poesie" ("poems"). Venus and Adonis, the next to be painted, was designed to be viewed alongside Danaë, although not of the same size. Titian explained in a letter to Philip that the two paintings would offer contrasting front and rear views of a nude Venus, thus allowing painting to compete with sculpture.

Until very recently it was assumed that the Prado version was this one, but after cleaning and conservation in 2013 of a work in the collection of the Duke of Wellington, it became clear that Philip's version, after some 250 years in the Spanish royal collection, was given to the first Duke of Wellington after the British army captured a carriage full of paintings from the Spanish royal collection at the Battle of Vitoria in 1813.

Joseph Bonaparte, whose brother Napoleon had made him King of Spain, had already lost Madrid, escaping with over 200 paintings in the carriage. Most had been removed from their frames and were rolled up in a large "imperial" or travelling-chest, along with state papers, love letters, and other documents. After a quick look, Wellington and his staff thought there was nothing very important or valuable in it, but sent the imperial by sea to his brother William, Lord Maryborough (then) in London for a proper check. His brother called in William Seguier, later the first keeper of the National Gallery, who recognised the quality of the paintings and compiled a list of 165 of the most important works.

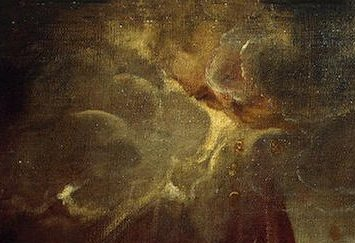
Jupiter's face, St Petersburg

Wellington then informed the court of the restored Bourbon King Ferdinand VII of Spain, to make arrangements for their return, but the king said Wellington should keep them as a gift. The Arnolfini Portrait by Jan van Eyck was also in the carriage, but (being conveniently small) appears to have been looted by the soldiers, and next appeared in London in 1816 in the possession of Colonel James Hay, a Scottish colonel who had been at Vitoria.

Wellington's version, previously thought to be a copy, remains in the family, at Apsley House in London, but not in the parts of the house open to the public. It and two other Titians reattributed at the same time were briefly put on public exhibition there, for the first time, in 2015. Until January 2021 it was in an exhibition at the National Gallery, London.

The upper part of the painting was cut away in the late 18th century, apparently because it was damaged. This version is known from copies and a print, and includes a face of Jupiter in the clouds and his attribute, an eagle clutching bolts of lightning. The face in the cloud is not in all versions, and is best seen in the Chicago, Vienna and St. Petersburg versions. This is the first version to include the "attendant crone", the painting of which Nicholas Penny describes as "remarkable and very exciting".

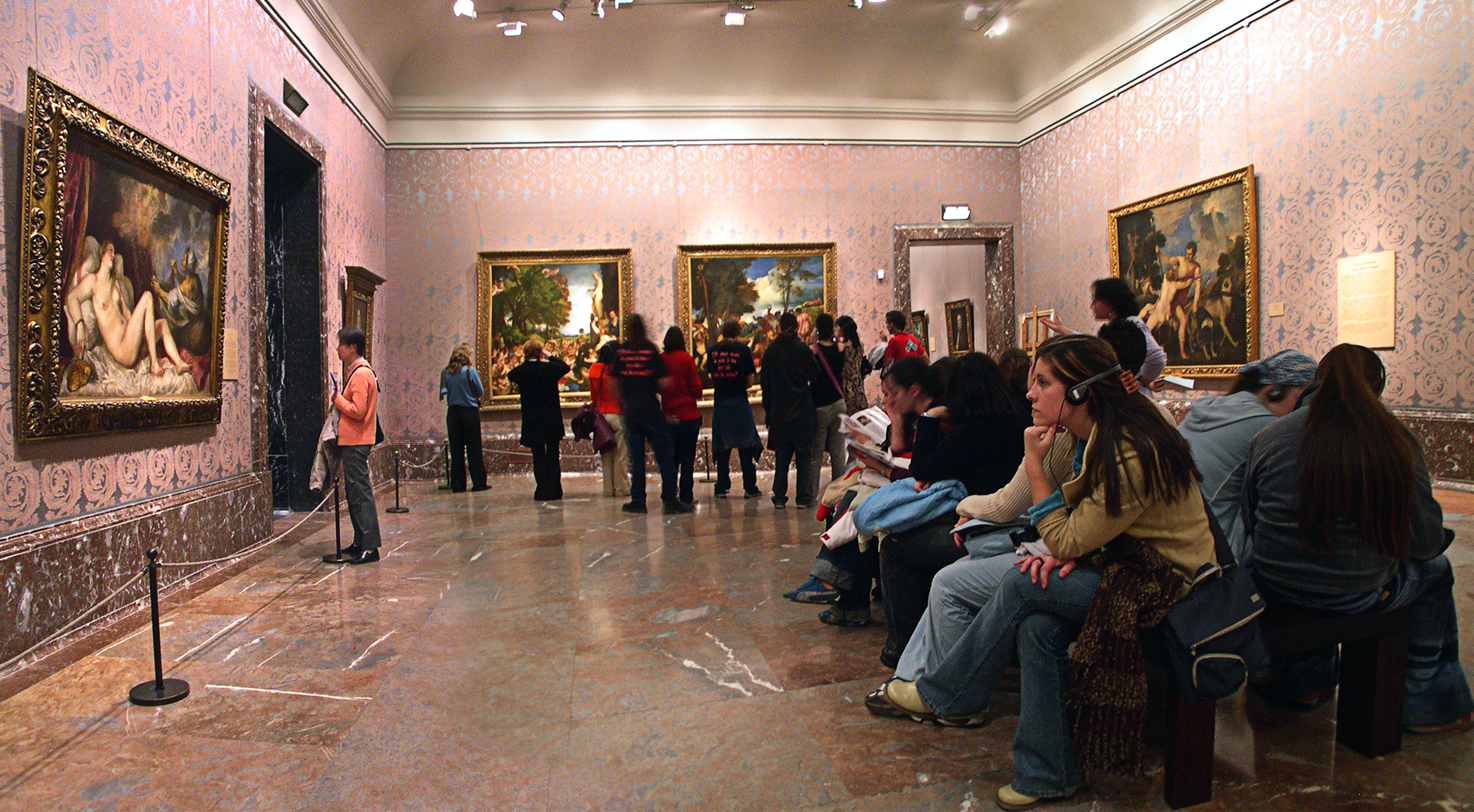
Titian paintings on display in the Museo del Prado (from left to right: Danaë and the Shower of Gold, The Worship of Venus, Bacchanal of the Andrians and Venus and Adonis)

The Prado version is now agreed to be one painted around 1565, which only joined the Spanish royal collection in the 17th century, bought in Italy by Velasquez, and sold to Philip IV of Spain. It is of very high quality, and after the gift to Wellington, it took its place. For Sheila Hale it is "the most sensuous of all Titian's female nudes ... [and] transmits a dark erotic charge that makes all previous reclining nudes ... look innocent by comparison." It is now shown in the same room in the Prado as their Venus and Adonis and other Titians.

The greenish cast of Venus's skin is set against the pale hues of the younger woman. Danaë parts her lips in pleasure, while the gold spills in greater quantity and with more velocity than in the Naples work. The painting is rendered in a looser manner than this; for example the folds of the bed linen and pillow are described with shorter, more expressive brushstrokes.

== Other versions ==
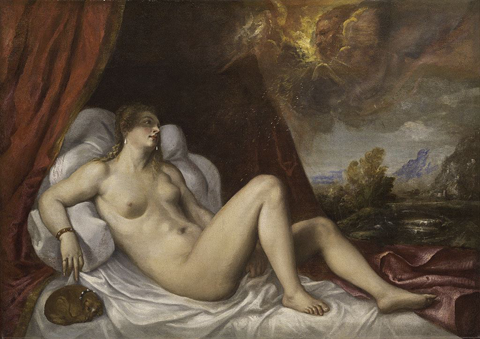
The Art Institute of Chicago version

There are other significant versions which are thought to be at least by Titian's workshop, with some involvement by the master, in particular those in the Hermitage Museum in St Petersburg, the Art Institute of Chicago and the Kunsthistorisches Museum in Vienna. Titian's reclining nudes were extremely popular, and he was evidently often asked for repetitions. Other secular Titian compositions with several versions are the Venus and Adonis with which this was paired, and the Venus and Musician, with either an organist or a lute-player. Typically, as in this case, the main nude figure was traced from a record kept in the studio, but lesser figures and the background often more loosely copied, or freshly devised for each version.

The Hermitage Museum's version, which they date to c. 1554, came from the Crozat Collection in Paris and was acquired in 1772; in 2017 it was not on display. The version in the Kunsthistorisches Museum, Vienna, includes much work by members of Titian's workshop, as revealed by the heavier treatment of Danaë's skin-tone and body as well as the hanging drapery. Here there is a pink rose on the sheet beside Danaë, and a face of Jupiter in the cloud.

The Chicago version is estimated to date "after 1554", has a landscape in the right background, and is mostly by the workshop, though Penny singles out the "astonishing landscape with vibrant light effects and the face of Jove among the clouds". A dog is curled up beside Danaë (as in the Prado), and there is no old woman, or falling gold.

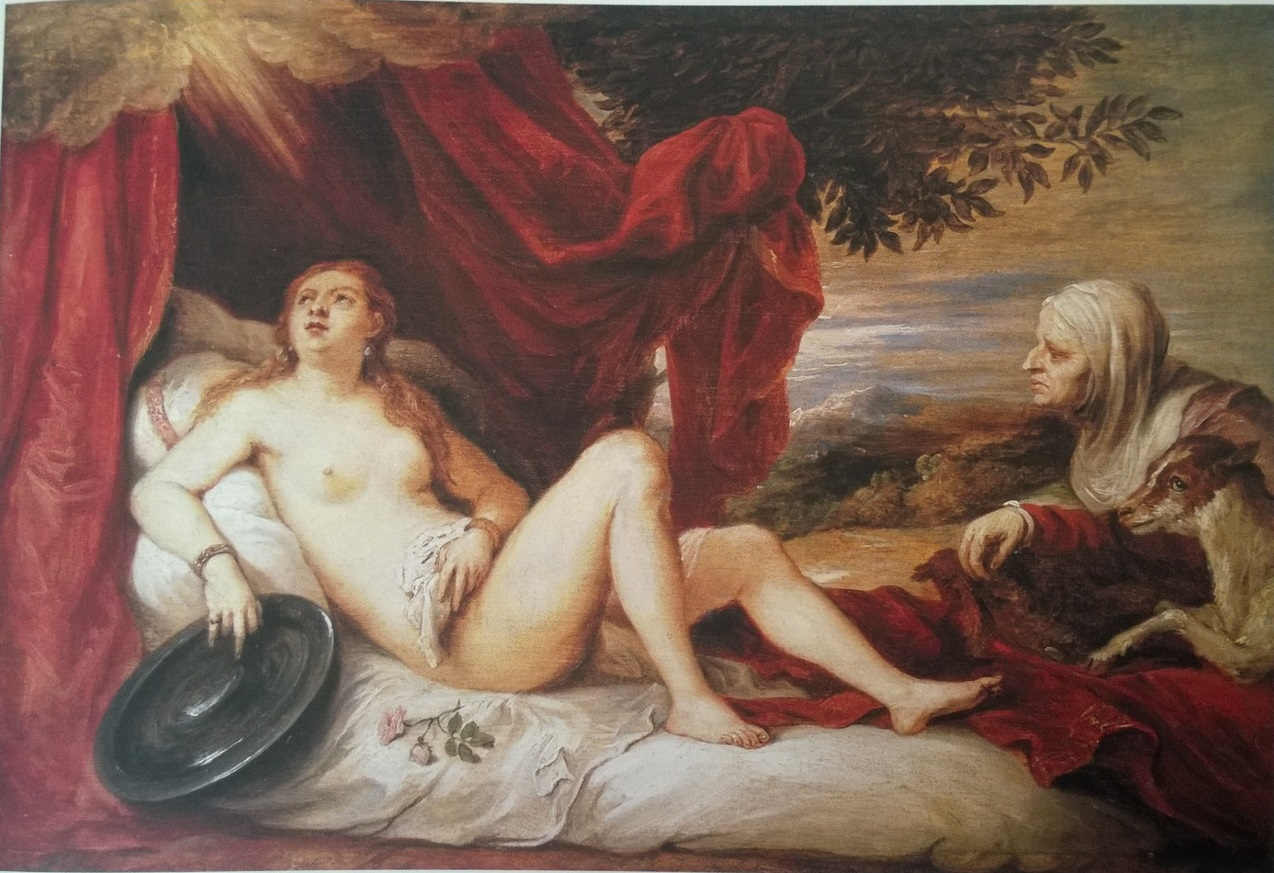
Reduced copy by David Teniers the Younger of a different variant

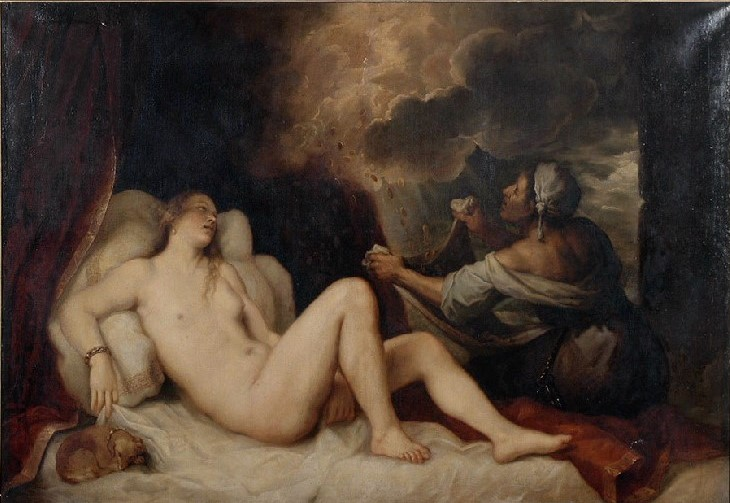
The Strasbourg copy

The Museum of Fine Arts of Strasbourg, France, holds a copy of the Prado version, but of larger dimensions (137 cm x 200 cm). It belonged to the British collector John Charles Robinson, who presented it to the Strasbourg museum in 1893, together with Guercino's Samson and Delilah. The Strasbourg Danaë had belonged to the collection of Giovanni Carlo Doria in Genoa and is most probably an early 17th-century Genoese Baroque copy of the Titian.

=== Teniers ===
A version that is significantly different in several details appears to have been lost, and is known only from reduced copies by David Teniers the Younger, made when it was in the collection of Archduke Leopold Wilhelm of Austria in the Spanish Netherlands. In this, although the bed and bed-clothes remain the same, the setting has been moved outside, with a distant landscape shown, and though there is an old women at the right, she is much more sympathetically portrayed and is accompanied by a young goat, so presumably represents a goatherd or similar figure. Danaë has her usual pose, but the gold has not begun to shower down. She (rather than the old woman, as in the Vienna version) carries a large metal dish in readiness to catch it.

This version is copied in Tenier's Gallery of Archduke Leopold Wilhelm (Brussels) and The Archduke Leopold Wilhelm in his Painting Gallery in Brussels (Prado), both of 1651, and was engraved in 1673. Tenier's copies were usually faithful, although they do not allow a judgement of the quality of the original. This must have been high, as the paintings show the highlights of the collection and company the copy keeps is superb – in the smaller painting it is next to Giorgione's The Three Philosophers. Most of the Archduke's collection passed to the Imperial collection in Vienna, and then the Kunsthistorisches Museum, but apparently not this piece.

== Michelangelo ==
When Michelangelo and Giorgio Vasari visited Titian at his temporary studio in the Vatican Belvedere in November 1545, they were shown the original Farnese Danaë, then in the process of completion. Michelangelo highly praised Titian's use of colour, but later expressed reservations on his grasp of the "sound principles" of draughtsmanship and composition. Vasari's account of Michelangelo's comment is:

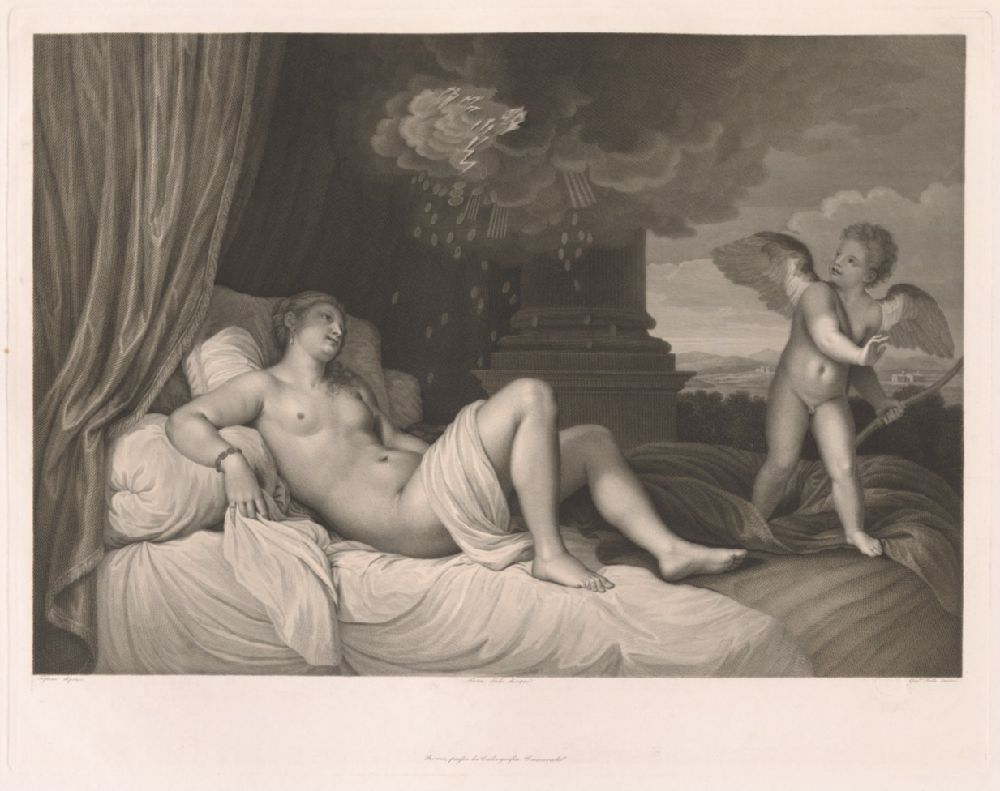
Giovanni Folo after Titian, "Danaë," published 1832, engraving and etching, Department of Image Collections, National Gallery of Art Library, Washington, DC

For I am conscious that if this man was as much assisted by art, as he is by nature, no mortal could go further. He has a noble spirit; but as of present having no knowledge of design, he in his imitations of the life corrects nothing nor attempts to make it better, though possessed of a manner so easy and beautiful, so full of truth and animation. But certain it is, that not having studied the best work of the ancients, the Venetians know not how to mend or how to give a grace and perfection to their works beyond their model, which is never perfect in all parts. The moderns in general cannot, from their own resources, be correct, but are obliged to make a literal copy of the object before their eyes, not knowing what it ought to be.

Vasari's account needs to be treated within context; in his view draftsmanship – disegno – was the highest achievement in art, while colour was secondary. This belief may have led to his fabrication of the anecdote in order to give more weight to his views.

== Mythological commissions ==
The Madrid version of Danaë is no longer thought to be part of the commission from Philip II for seven mythological paintings by Titian, but rather a later addition to the royal collection. It is displayed in the same room as Venus and Adonis from the original commission.

== Titian's poesie series for Philip II ==
- Danaë, delivered to Philip 1553, now Wellington Collection, with earlier and later versions.
- Venus and Adonis, Museo del Prado, delivered 1554, and several other versions
- The Rape of Europa, c. 1560–1562, Isabella Stewart Gardner Museum
- Diana and Actaeon, 1556–1559, owned jointly by London's National Gallery and the National Gallery of Scotland in Edinburgh
- Diana and Callisto, 1556–1559, owned jointly by London's National Gallery and the National Gallery of Scotland in Edinburgh
- Perseus and Andromeda, Wallace Collection, c. 1553–1562
- The Death of Actaeon, National Gallery, never delivered and not always counted in the series, c. 1559 onwards
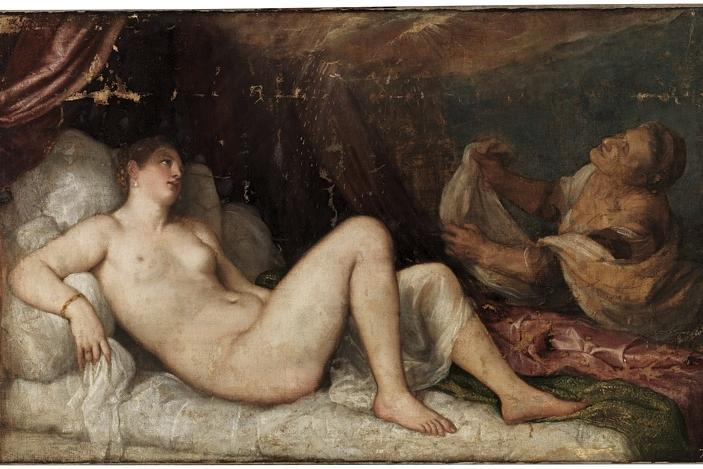
Danaë delivered to Philip 1550, now Wellington Collection, with earlier and later versions.

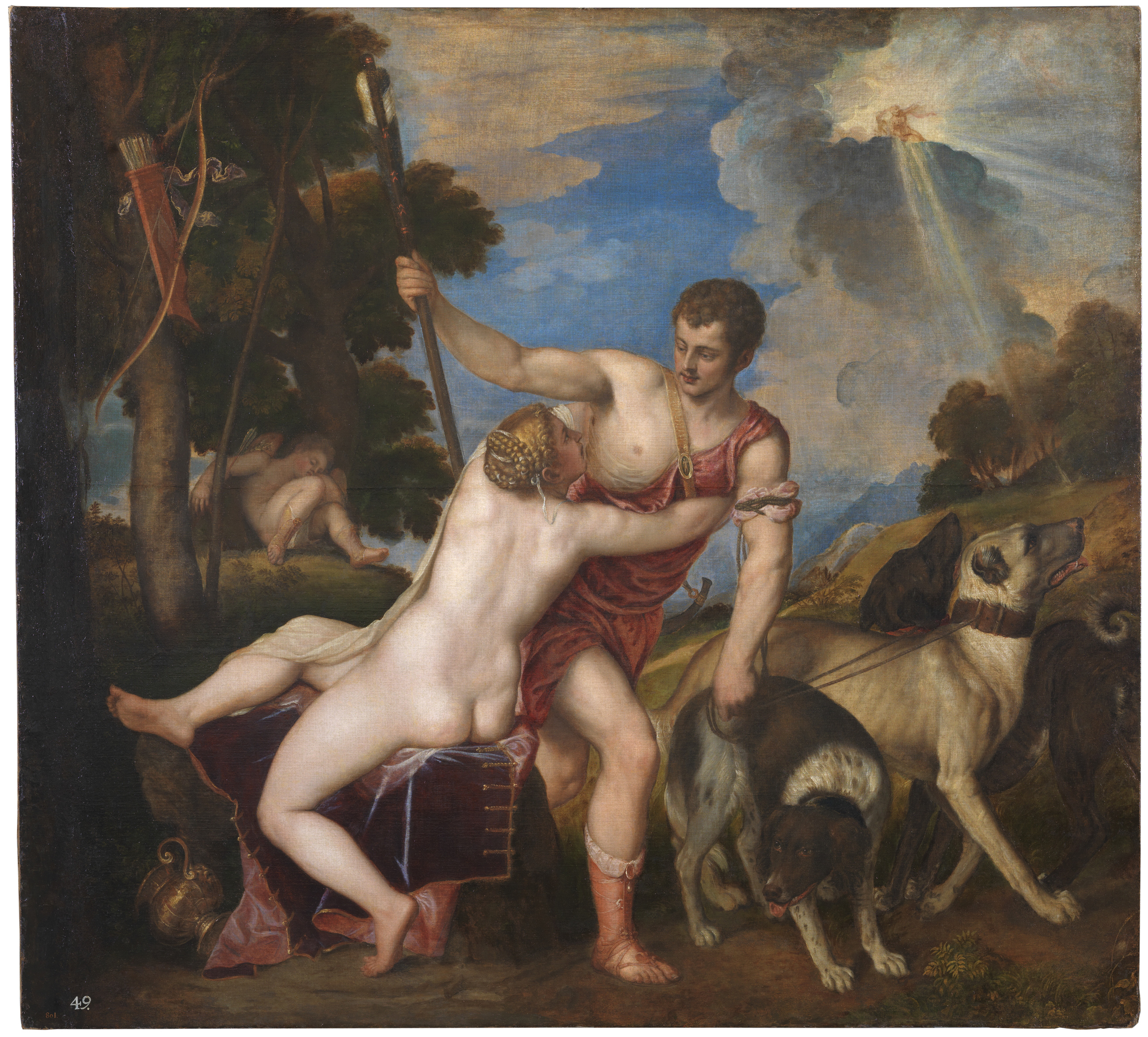
Venus and Adonis, Museo del Prado, delivered 1554, and several other versions

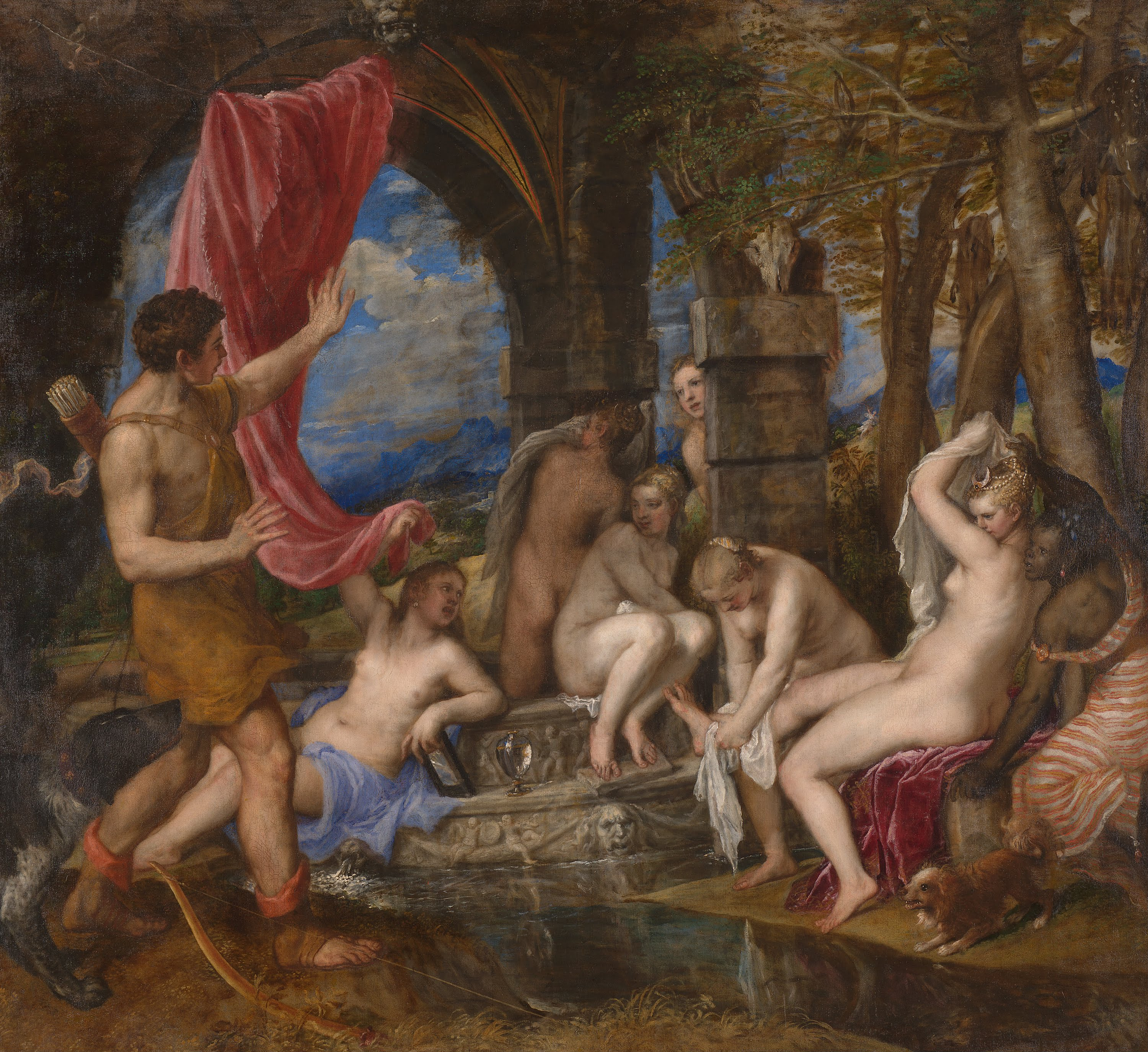
Diana and Actaeon, 1556–1559, owned jointly by London's National Gallery and the National Gallery of Scotland, Edinburgh

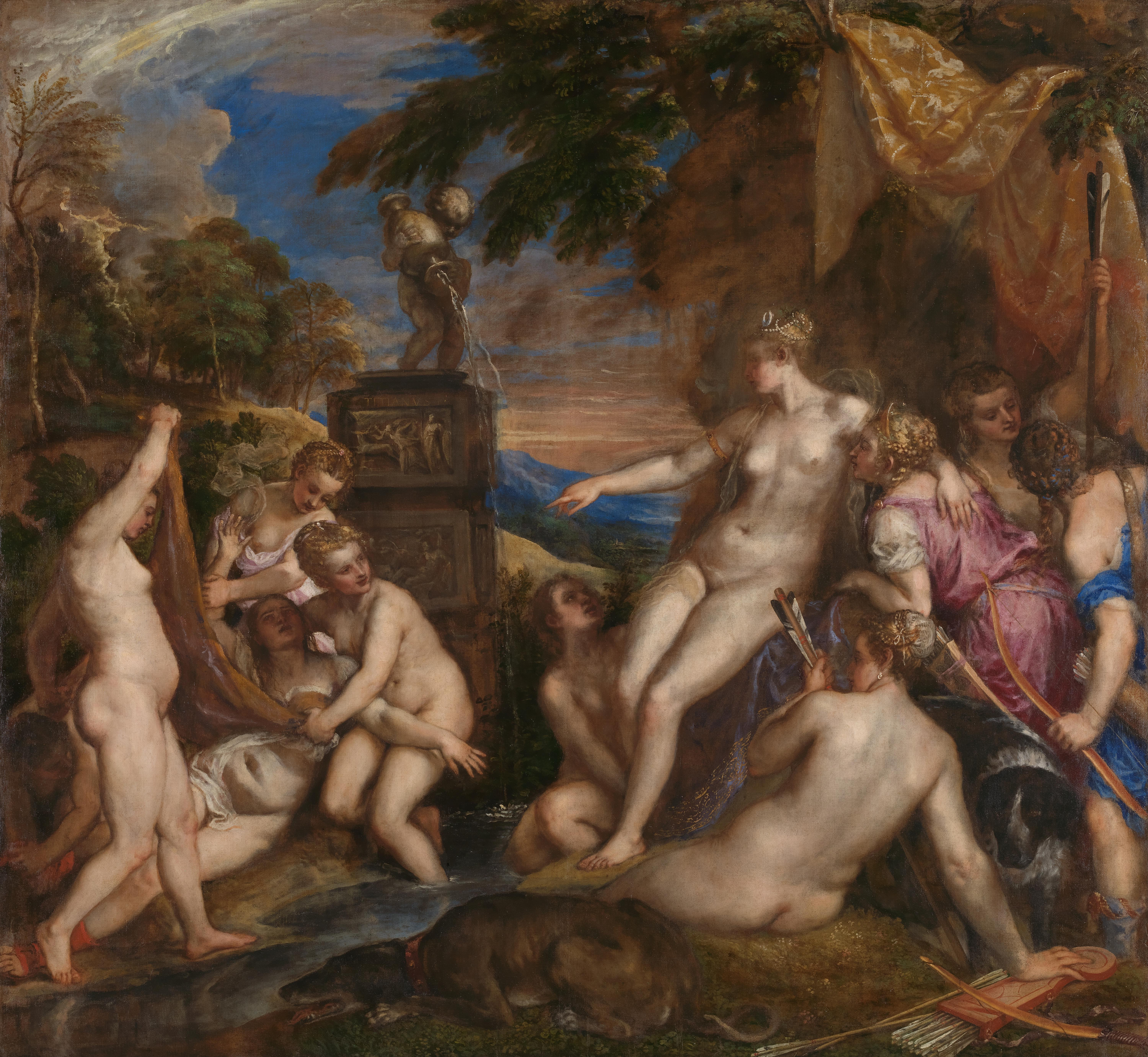
Diana and Callisto, 1556–1559, owned jointly by London's National Gallery and the National Gallery of Scotland, Edinburgh

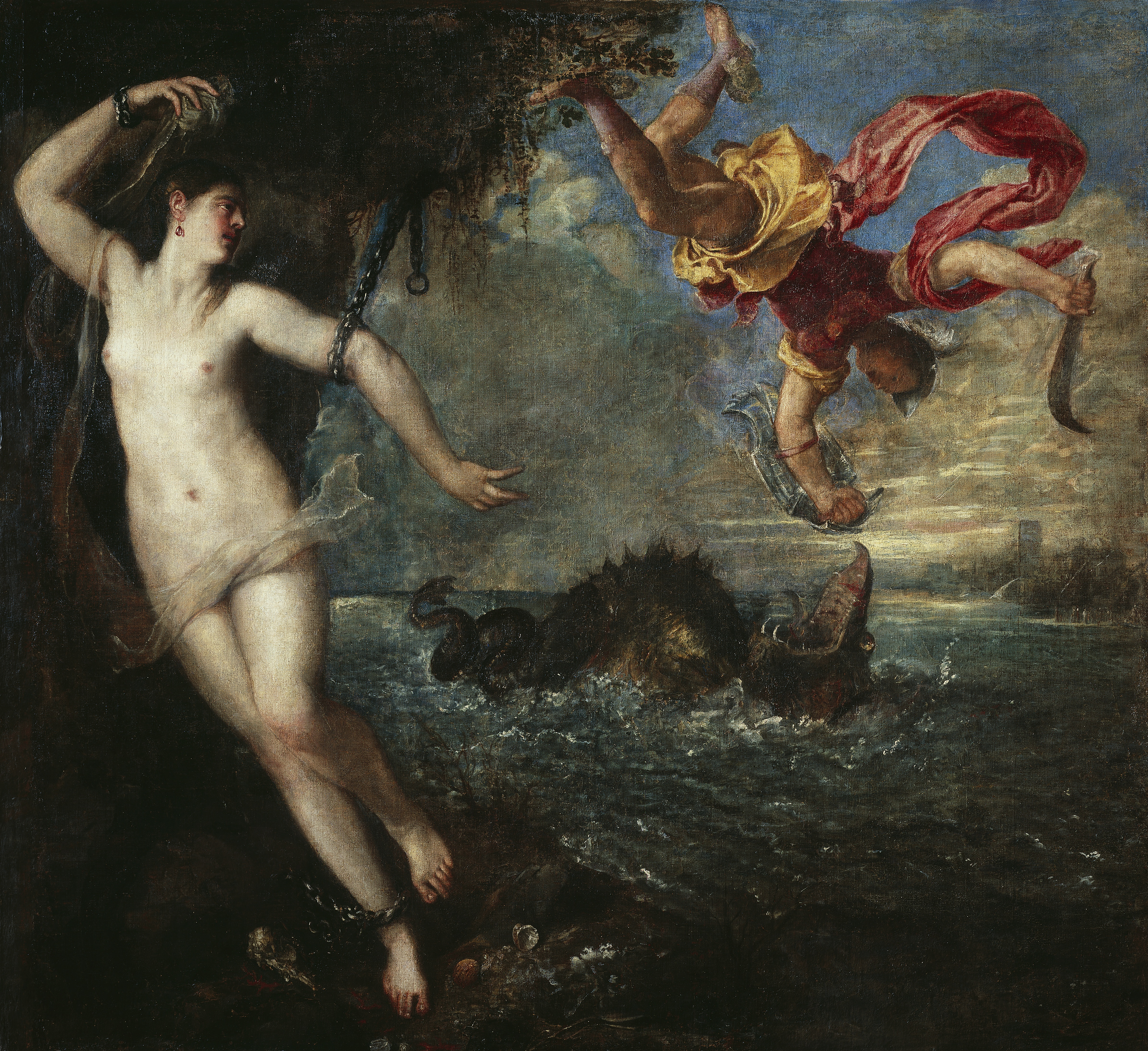
Perseus and Andromeda, Wallace Collection, London, c. 1554–1556

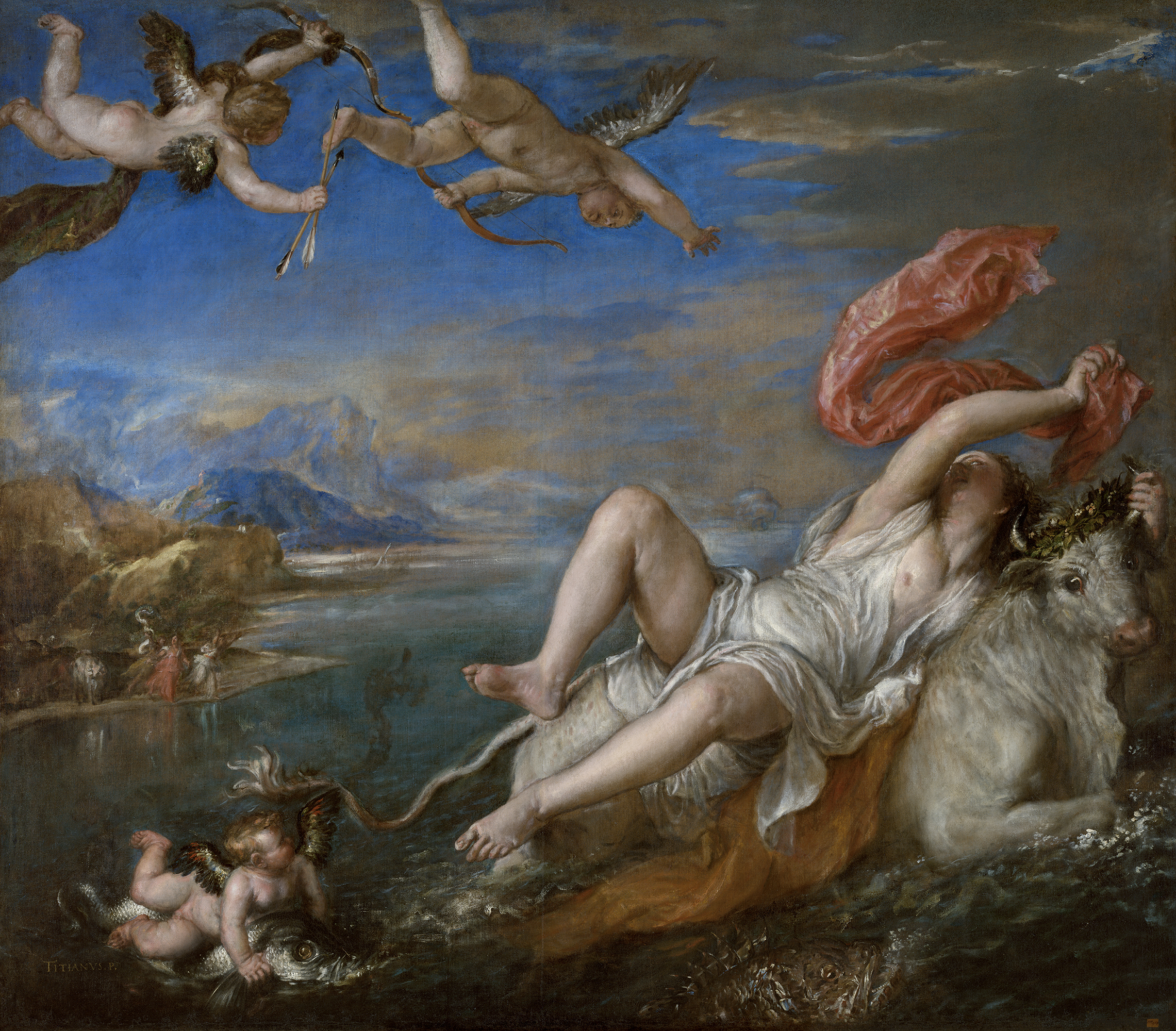
The Rape of Europa, c. 1560–1562, Isabella Stewart Gardner Museum, Massachusetts

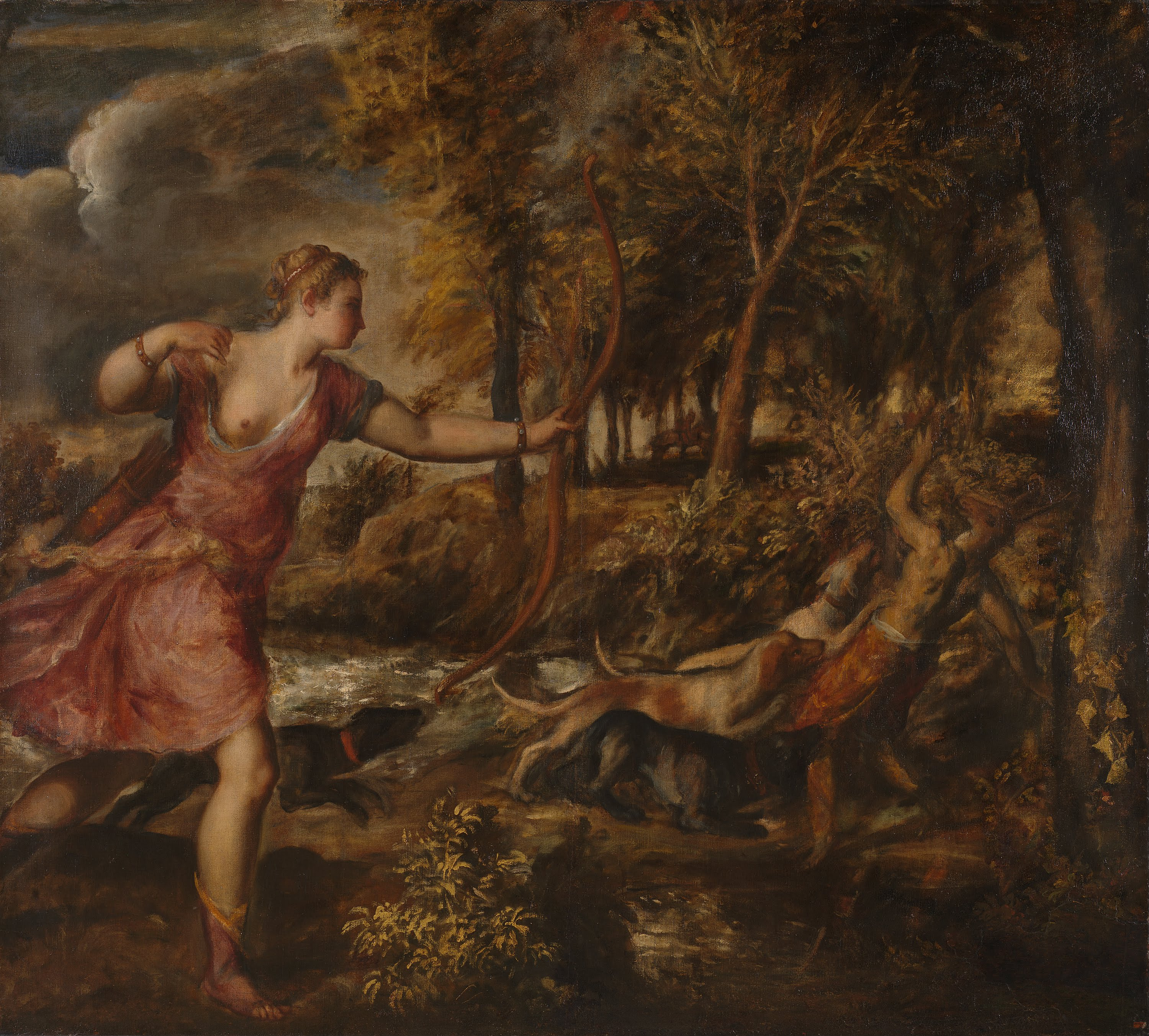
The Death of Actaeon, National Gallery, London, never delivered, c. 1559 onwards

== See also ==
- List of works by Titian
