= The Death of Actaeon =

Painting by Titian

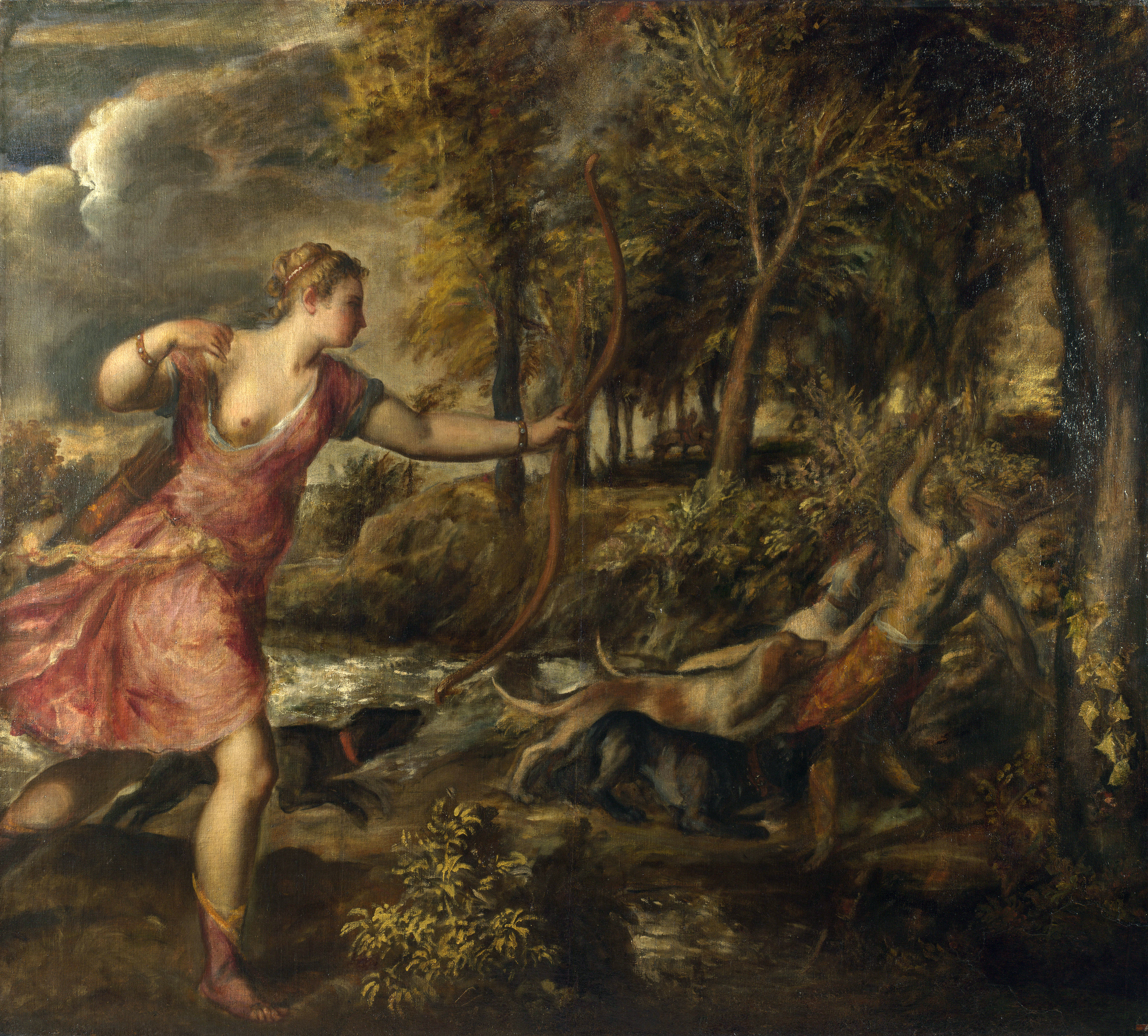
- Artist: Titian
- Year: c. 1559–1575
- Medium: Oil on canvas
- Dimensions: 178.4 cm × 198.1 cm (70.2 in × 78.0 in)
- Location: National Gallery, London

The Death of Actaeon is a late work by the Italian Renaissance painter Titian, painted in oil on canvas from about 1559 to his death in 1576 and now in the National Gallery in London. It is probably one of the two paintings the artist said he had started and hoped to finish (one of which he calls "Actaeon mauled by hounds") in a letter to their commissioner Philip II of Spain during June 1559. However, most of Titian's work on this painting possibly dates to the late 1560s, but with touches from the 1570s. Titian seems to have never resolved it to his satisfaction, and the painting apparently remained in his studio until his death in 1576. There has been considerable debate as to whether it is finished or not, as with other very late Titians, such as the Flaying of Marsyas, which unlike this has a signature, perhaps an indication of completion.

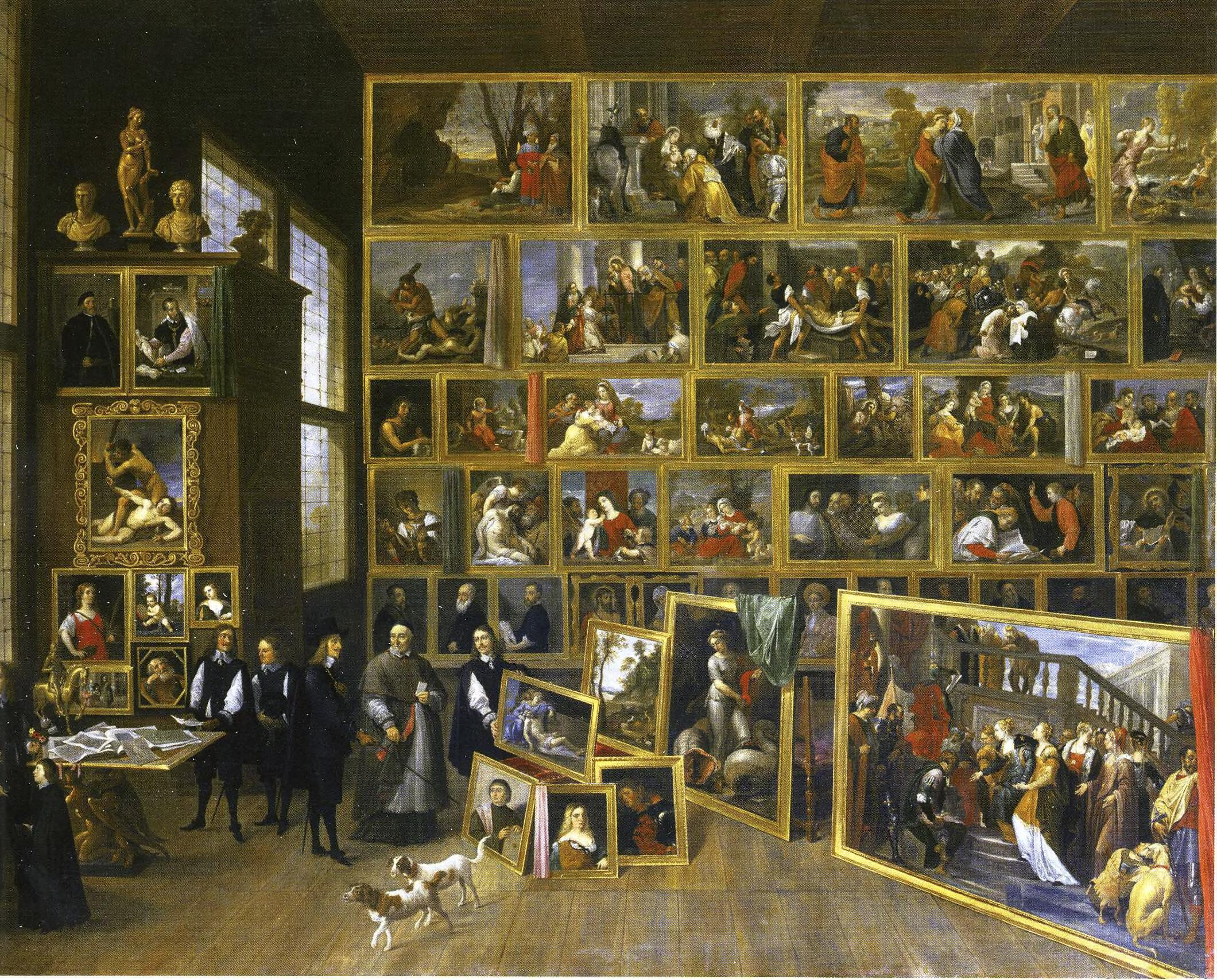
This painting is visible upper-right in Gallery of Archduke Leopold Wilhelm in Brussels (Petworth), 1651

It is a sequel of Titian's work Diana and Actaeon showing the story's tragic conclusion, which roughly follows the Roman poet Ovid's account in the Metamorphoses: after Actaeon surprised the goddess Diana bathing naked in the woods, she transformed him into a stag and he was attacked and killed by his own hounds.

Both paintings belong to a group of large-scale mythological paintings inspired by the Metamorphoses and referred to by Titian himself as ‘poesie’, the visual equivalent of poetry, which he began producing for Philip II of Spain in 1551 and also include Danaë (many versions, the original, the first for Philip is in Apsley House, London, after Joseph Bonaparte took it away when he left Spain. A later copy of Titian himself, perhaps the most sensual of all is in the Prado, Madrid), Venus and Adonis (original in the Prado, Madrid, but also other versions), Perseus and Andromeda (Wallace Collection, London), The Rape of Europa (Isabella Stewart Gardner Museum, Boston), Diana and Actaeon and Diana and Callisto (shared by National Gallery of Scotland with NG London). However, as The Death of Actaeon was never delivered to Philip, it is not always counted in the series.

== Subject ==
Ovid's account does not include Diana herself pursuing Actaeon, or shooting at him, though in some other classical accounts she does chase him. She seems to have just loosed an arrow, but there is no sign of the arrow in the painting, nor is the bowstring visible. The goddess does not have her attribute of the small crescent in her hair that Titian's other two depictions in the poesie do, which troubled one early critic.

There were ancient reliefs and engraved gems showing either Diana hunting with dogs, or Actaeon being attacked by his dogs, and a few Renaissance works, but the subject was rare, and "it may be that Titian had never seen another painting or other representation of the subject."

== History ==
It was most likely still in Titian's studio at his death in 1576, and presumably sold in Venice by his heirs. It probably belonged to the famous Venetian collection of Bartolomeo della Nave, most of which was bought for James Hamilton, 1st Duke of Hamilton (then still a Marquess) in 1636–38, one of the great collectors of the time in Britain. Hamilton's brother-in-law, Basil Feilding, 2nd Earl of Denbigh (as he later became), was English ambassador to Venice, and helped to arrange the purchase. A list of available paintings he sent Hamilton includes "A Diana shooting Adonis in forme of a Hart not quite finished" by Titian.

Hamilton, who was a Royalist commander in the English Civil War, was captured and executed in 1649 after losing the Battle of Preston to Oliver Cromwell. This, like most of his collection, was bought by Archduke Leopold Wilhelm of Austria, Governor of the Spanish Netherlands from 1647 to 1656. The painting appears (looking rather lighter in tone than today) in David Teniers the Younger's painting of the Gallery of Archduke Leopold Wilhelm (1651, now Royal Museums of Fine Arts of Belgium, Brussels), as well as his different versions of the subject located in Petworth House and the Kunsthistorisches Museum in Vienna.

The archduke seems to have given it to Queen Christina of Sweden, whose route into exile went through the Spanish Netherlands, before she settled in Rome. It does not appear in an inventory of her collection made in Antwerp in 1656, but is in one made in Rome in 1662 or 1663. After her death it eventually passed, with much of her collection, into the Orleans Collection in Paris in 1721. Like most of the collection, it was bought by a consortium in London after the French Revolution, and then sold in 1798 to Sir Abraham Hume, 2nd Baronet for the sum of 200 guineas, the price no doubt reflecting that it was considered by Hume and others as unfinished. Hume described it as "a great painting never finished but quite beautiful".

Hume was the author of the first monograph on Titian, published in 1829, and "was especially appreciative of preliminary sketches by Venetian artists (or what he believed to be such)." His collection passed by descent to Adelbert Brownlow-Cust, 3rd Earl Brownlow, who was made a Trustee of the National Gallery in 1897. By 1914, Brownlow needed to raise some cash, and offered the gallery this painting for £5,000 and a portrait by Anthony van Dyck for £10,000, writing "I only ask from the Gallery what I consider to be a very low price because I am anxious to see them in the gallery".

The van Dyck was bought, but the Titian declined, because of the opposition of another trustee, Alfred de Rothschild, who declared that the Titian "would not fetch £5 at Christie's". Other trustees may have been in favour, but the "difficult character" of Rothschild, who was hoped to be planning a bequest to the gallery, might have resigned if the purchase was made. In 1919, the painting was bought via the dealers Colnaghi's for £60,000 by Henry Lascelles, 6th Earl of Harewood (then Viscount Lascelles), giving "the measure of Rothschild's expertise and of Brownlow's generosity".

In 1971, when the painting had already been on loan to the National Gallery for ten years, the trustees of the 7th Earl sold the painting at Christie's for £1,680,000. It was bought by the dealer Julius Weitzner and swiftly resold to the J. Paul Getty Museum in Malibu for £1,763,000. At this point an export licence was needed, and the Reviewing Committee on the Export of Works of Art suspended granting one for a year to allow a British buyer to match this price. The public campaign in 1971 to purchase it for the United Kingdom was one of the great successes of Martin Davies's directorship of the National Gallery, despite Davies's own indifferent enthusiasm for the painting. It was eventually purchased in 1972 (as catalogue number NG6420) with £1,000,000 from the gallery's funds and a special Treasury grant matching other donations pound for pound. These included £100,000 from the Art Fund and £50,000 from the Pilgrim Trust, the rest raised by a public appeal, then a great innovation.

== Poesie mythological series ==
- Danaë, delivered to Philip in 1553, now Wellington Collection, with earlier and later versions
- Venus and Adonis, Museo del Prado, delivered 1554, and several other versions
- Perseus and Andromeda, Wallace Collection, c. 1554–1556
- Diana and Actaeon, 1556–1559, owned jointly by London's National Gallery and the National Gallery of Scotland in Edinburgh
- Diana and Callisto, 1556–1559, owned jointly by London's National Gallery and the National Gallery of Scotland in Edinburgh
- The Rape of Europa, c. 1560–1562, Isabella Stewart Gardner Museum
- The Death of Actaeon, National Gallery, never delivered, and often not counted in the series, c. 1559 onwards
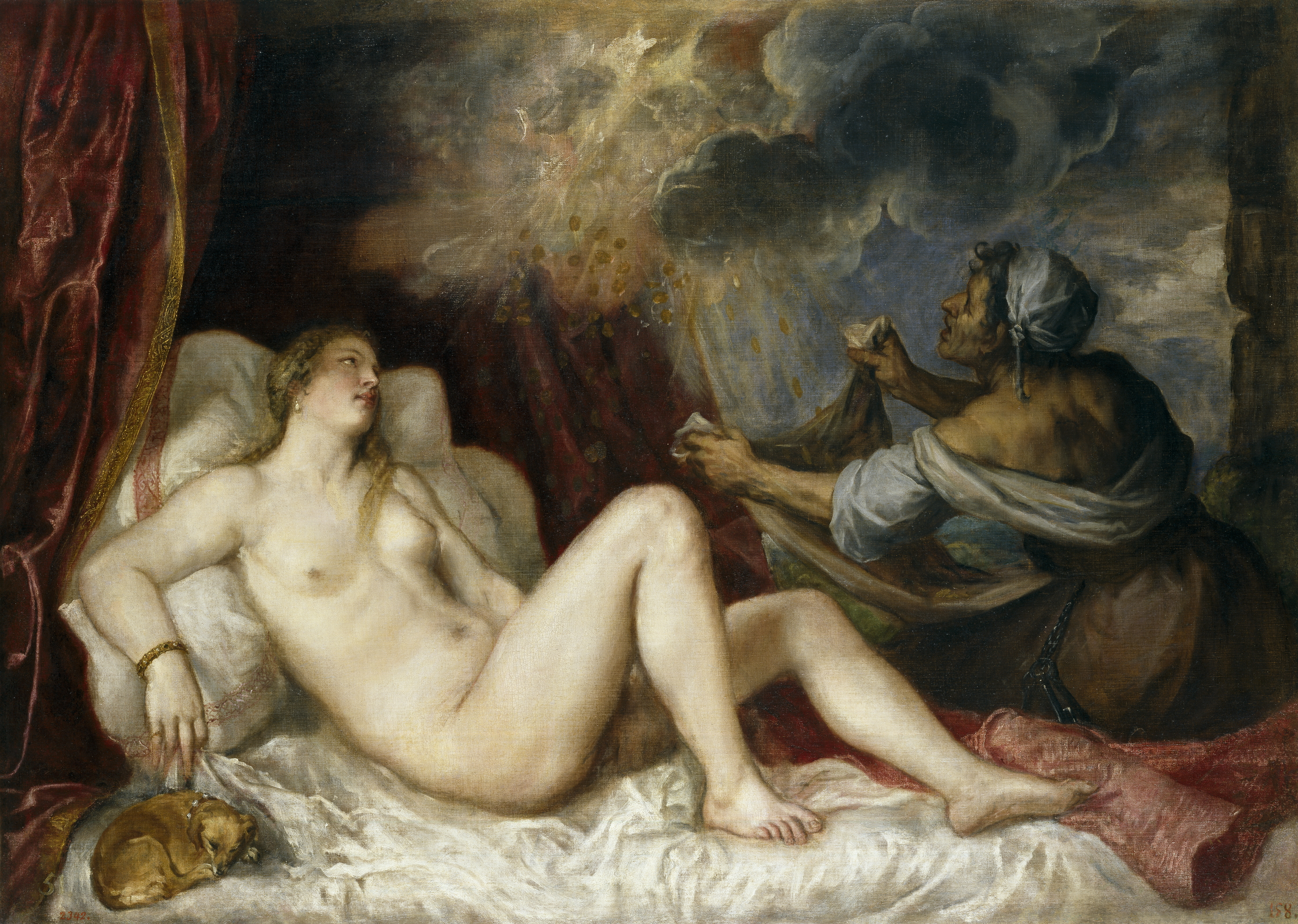
Danaë

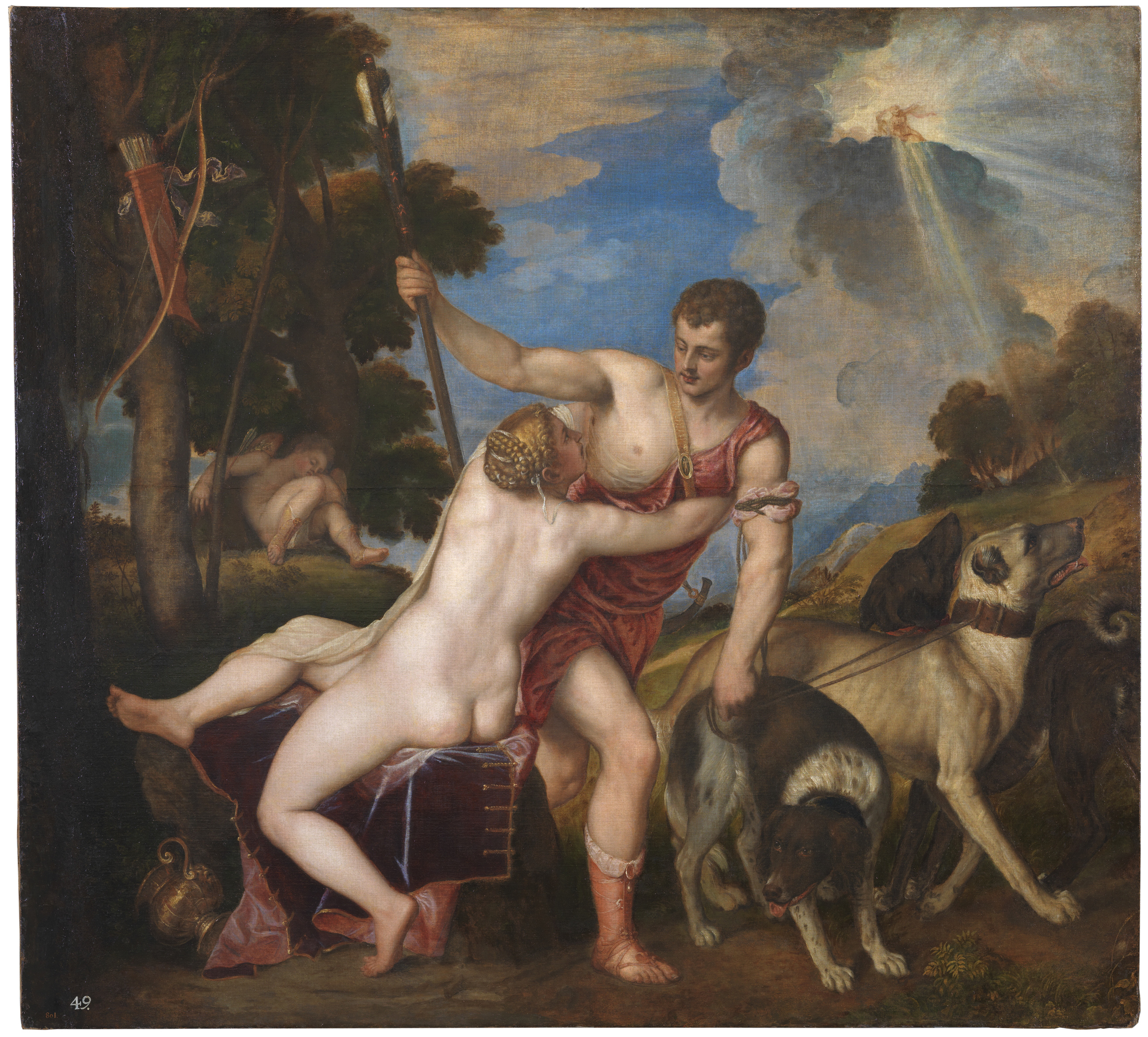
Venus and Adonis

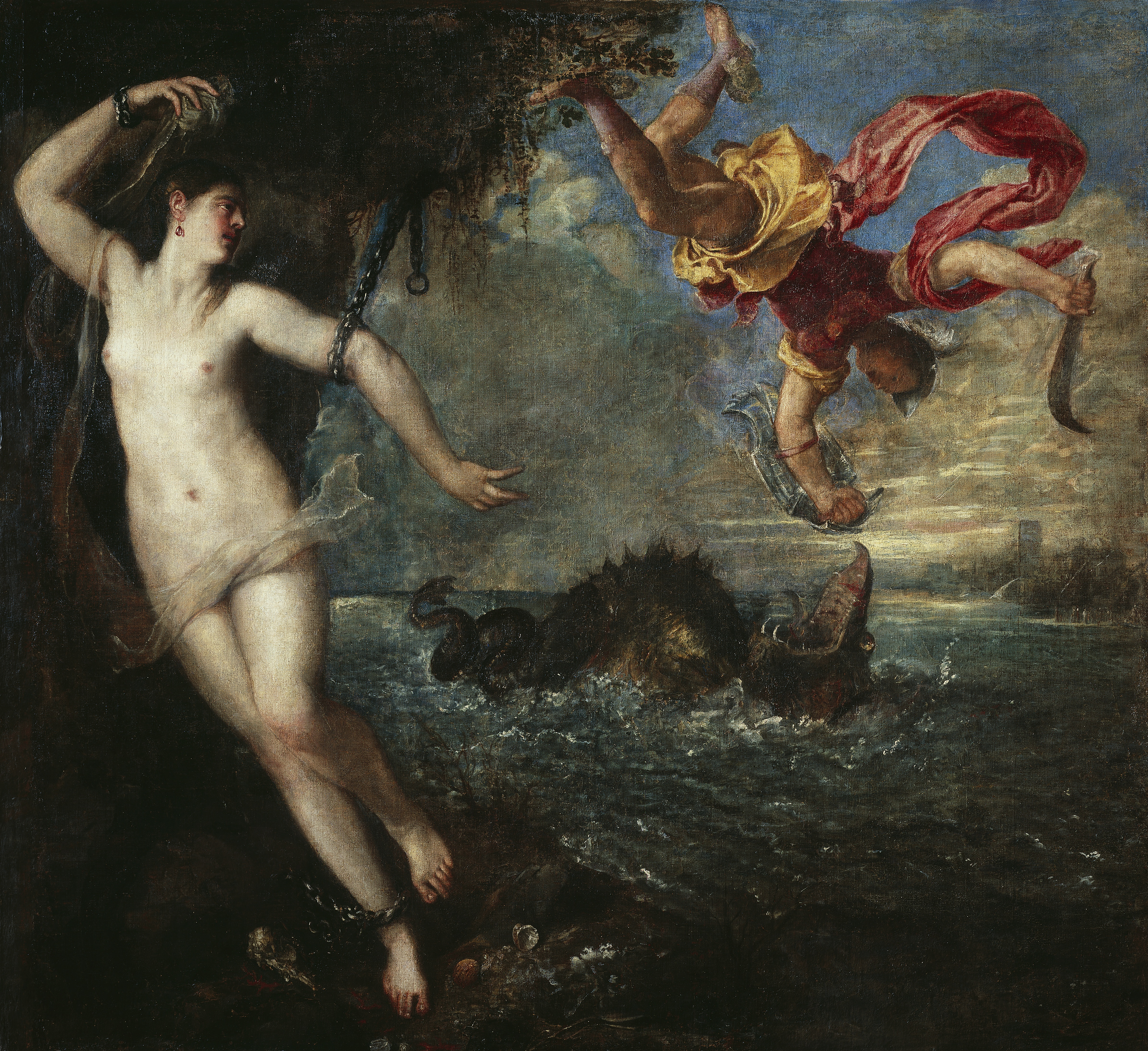
Perseus and Andromeda

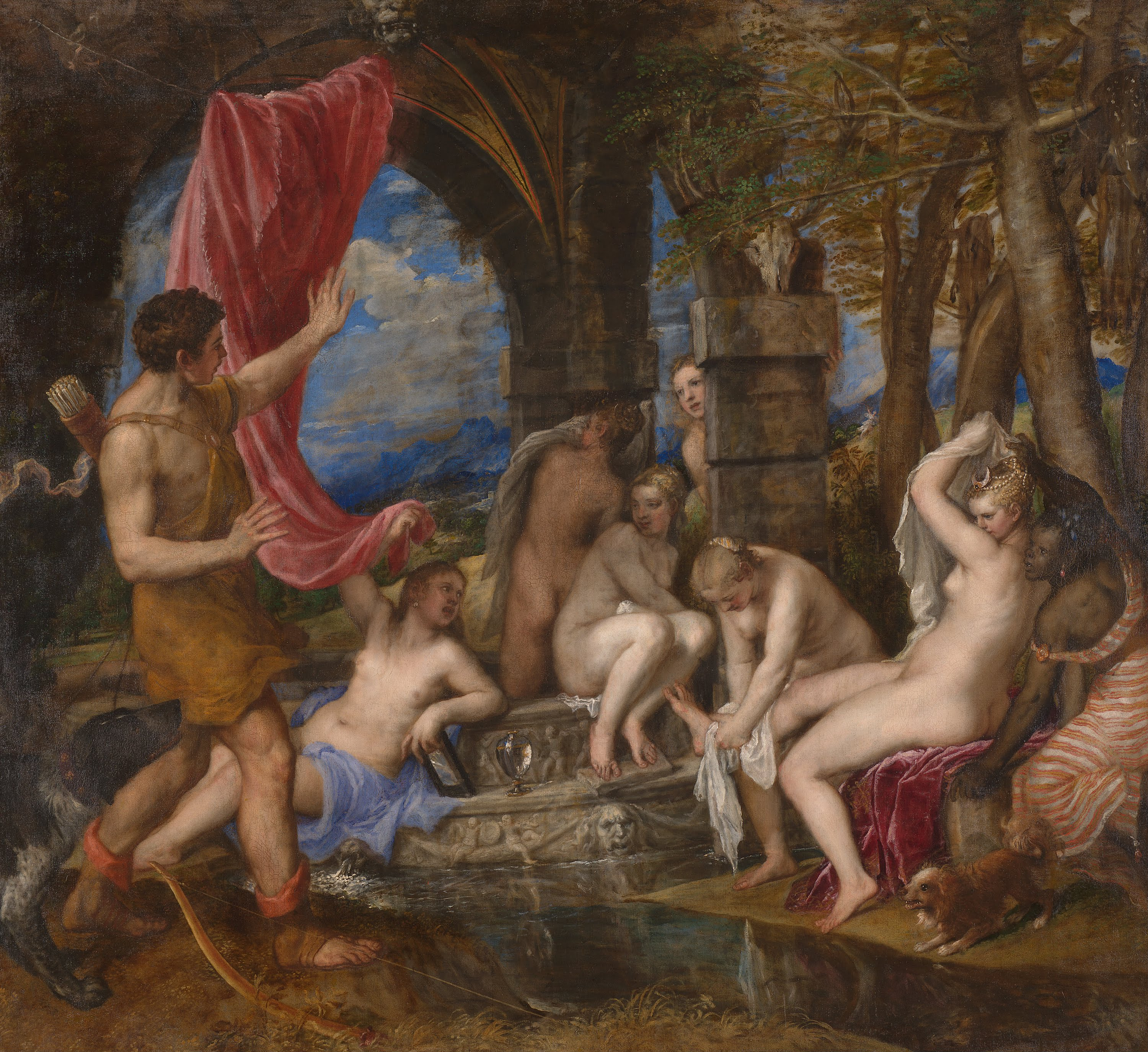
Diana and Actaeon

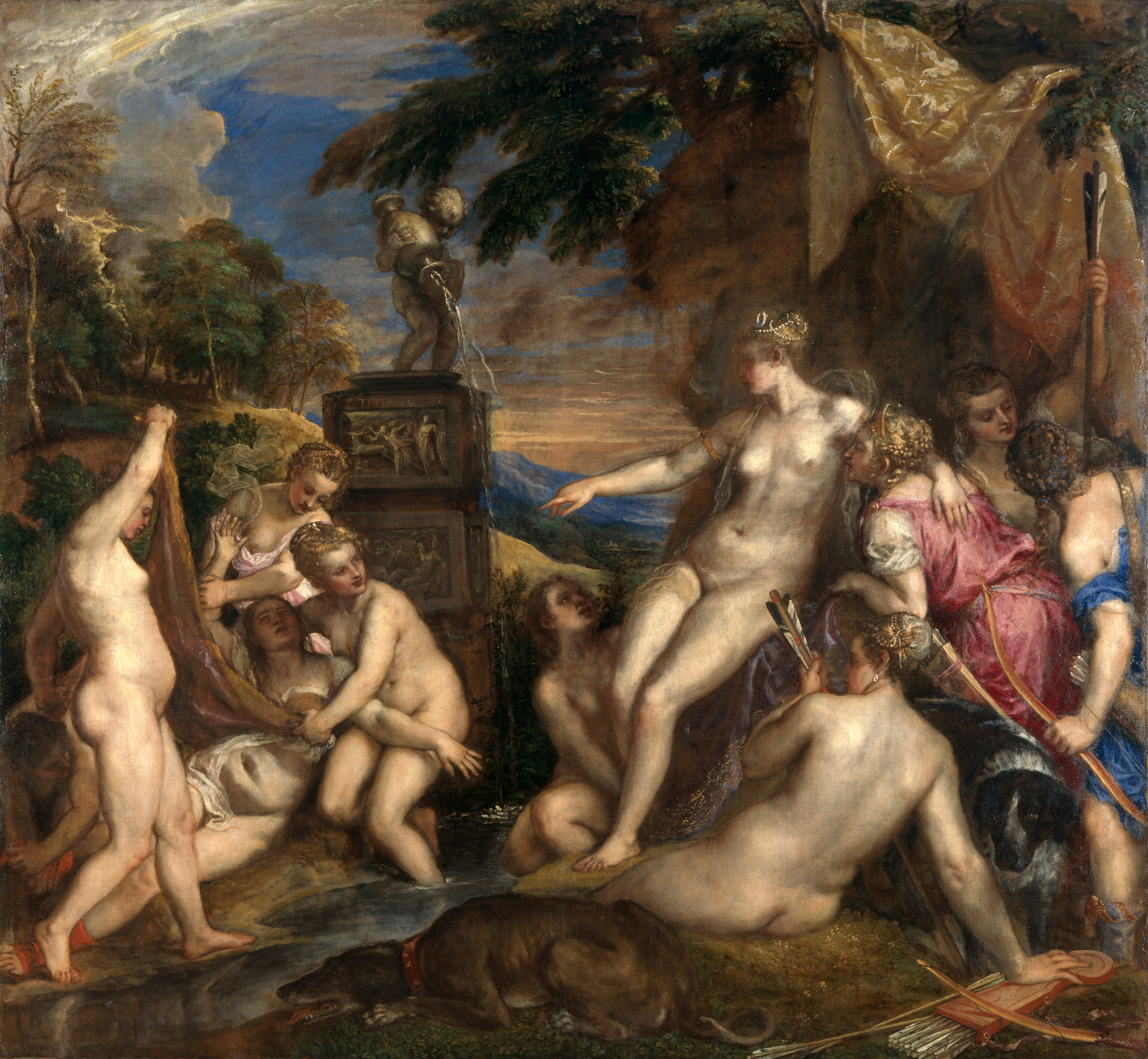
Diana and Callisto

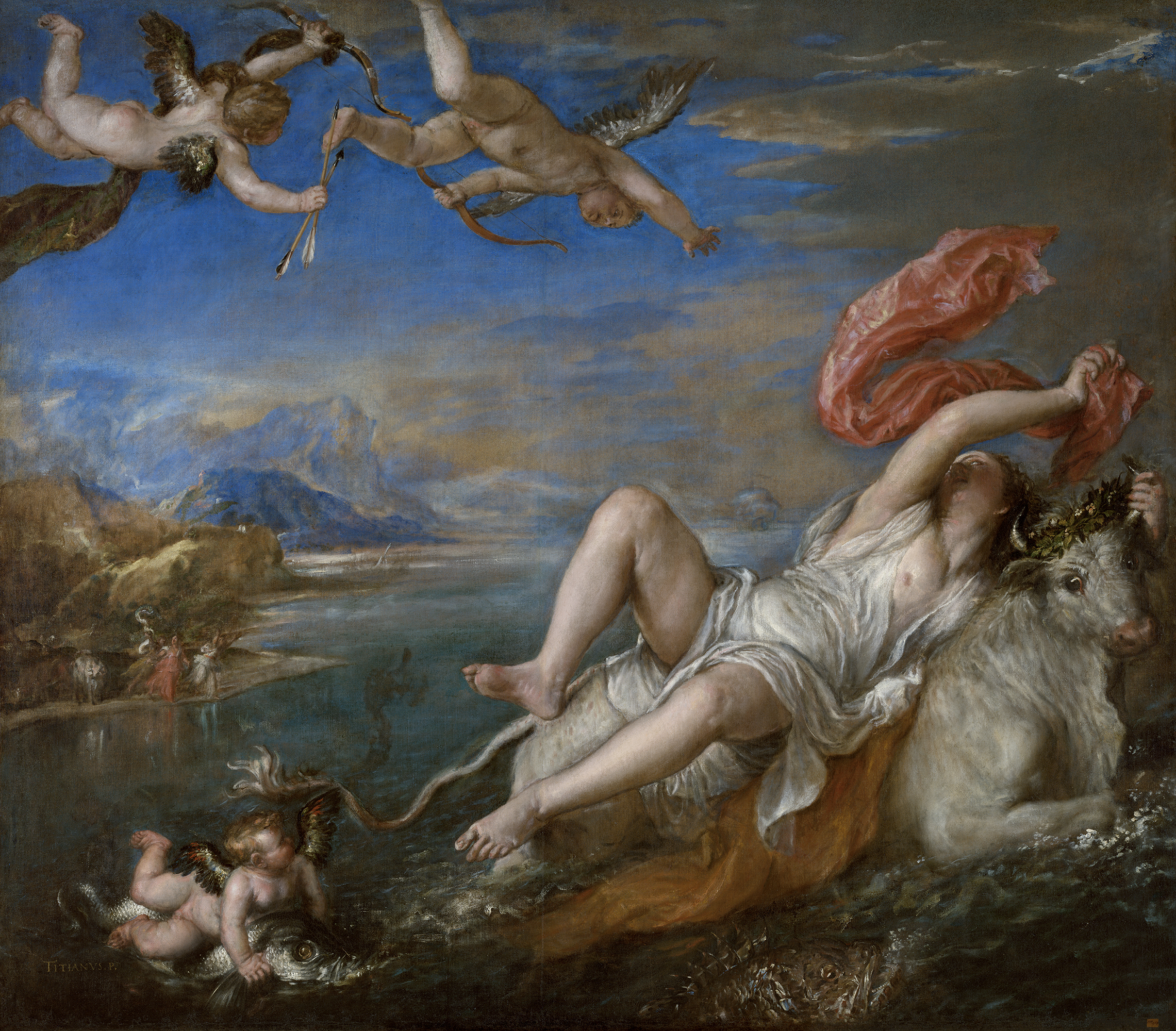
The Rape of Europa

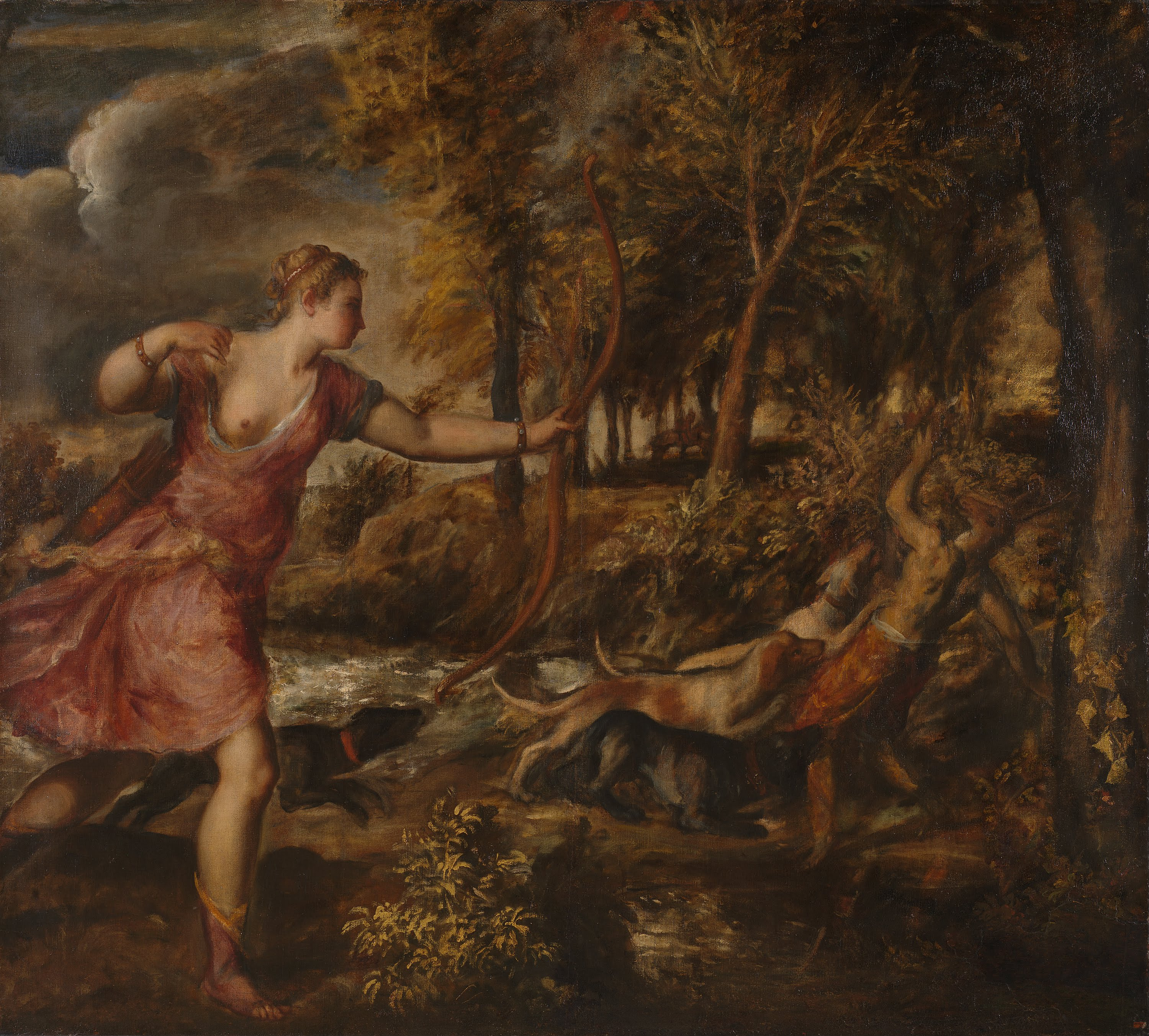
The Death of Actaeon

== See also ==
- List of works by Titian
