= Perseus and Andromeda (Titian) =

1554-56 painting by Titian

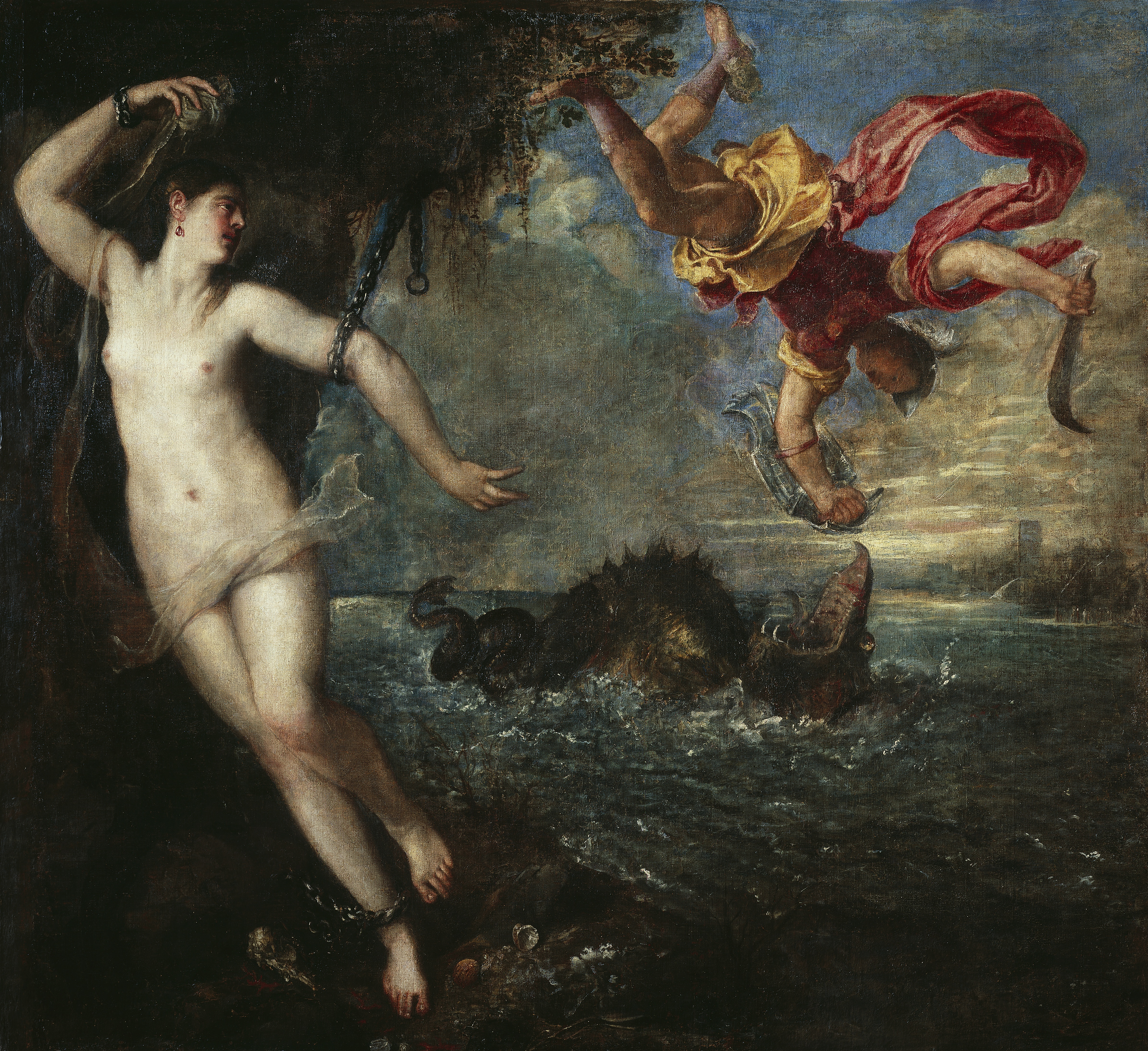
Perseus and Andromeda (1554-1556) by Titian

Perseus and Andromeda is a painting by the Italian Renaissance artist Titian, now in the Wallace Collection, in London. It was painted in 1554–1556 as part of a series of mythological paintings called "poesie" ("poetry") intended for King Philip II of Spain. The paintings took subjects from the Roman poet Ovid's Metamorphoses, in this case Book IV, lines 663–752, and all featured female nudes.

The painting is in oils on canvas, and measures 175 x 189.5 cm. It was probably one already described as "damaged" in 1605, and has suffered subsequent damages, as well as apparently being cut down along all the sides. Scientific imaging techniques show an unusually large number of changes as the composition evolved.

The painting depicts the hero Perseus flying through the air to combat a sea monster, which was sent by Poseidon (or Zeus, depending on the account) to kill Andromeda, who is chained to a cliff by the sea as a sacrifice to the beast. Perseus has already attacked and wounded the monster on the shoulder.

The painting is well-travelled; painted in Venice, it was delivered in modern Belgium, then went to Spain, Italy, England, and France before returning to England.

== Subject and sources ==
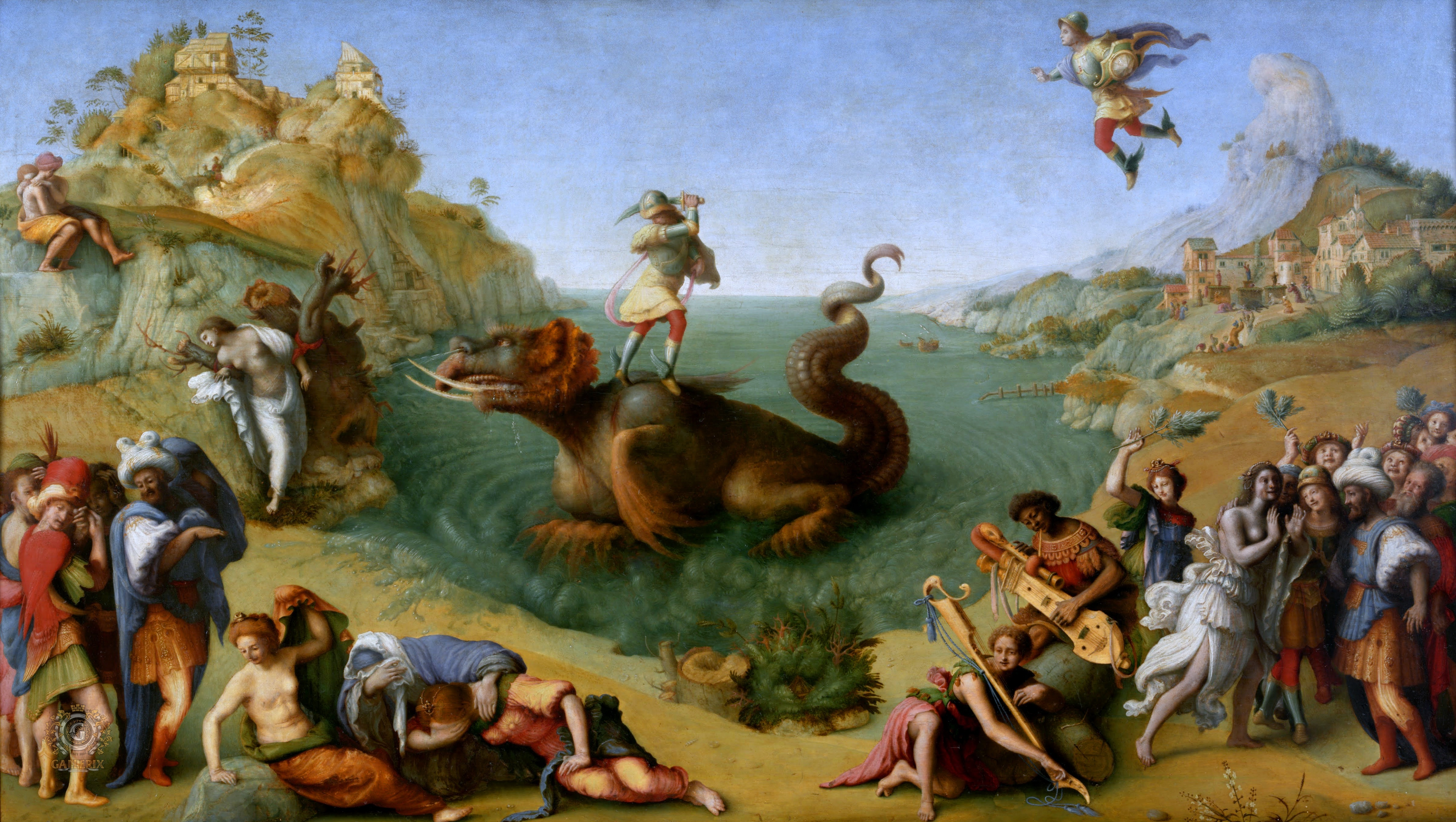
Perseus Freeing Andromeda by Piero di Cosimo, c. 1510, one of the few earlier easel paintings of the subject, Uffizi

In Greek mythology, the kingdom of Ethiopia was ruled by the beautiful but vain queen, Cassiope; she maintained that her beauty, and that of her daughter Andromeda, was superior to that of the sea nymphs, who were the daughters of Poseidon, the god of the sea. When the nymphs became aware of her claims, they protested to their father, who retaliated by calling up a Cetus or sea monster to ravage the coastline of Ethiopia placing Cassiope's kingdom at risk. On the advice of Jupiter Ammon, the Queen, together with her husband Cepheus, decided to sacrifice her daughter Andromeda to the monster. Perseus, flying back from his killing of the gorgon Medusa, kills the monster and rescues Andromeda, whom he then marries.

Titian follows Ovid fairly closely, although it is likely that his Latin was poor, and he mainly relied on somewhat simplified versions in Italian, of which there was a choice. This may explain some of the differences to the Latin original, although Titian may well just have interpreted the story freely. In Ovid Andromeda's parents are nearby; here they are probably on the shore opposite, by a city. Andromeda stands amid seashells and coral. Coral is mentioned by Ovid, but as being formed from Medusa's locks at a later stage in the story. Ovid describes Andromeda as looking like a statue, and having been crying; Titian's depiction matches both. Perseus had been given his curved sword by Mercury, and his shield by Minerva. Like Mercury, he wears winged boots, and also a winged helmet.

Various visual sources have been suggested, both from the rather crude woodcut illustrations of various editions of Ovid, and specific classical reliefs, as well as a well-known drawing by Michelangelo of the Risen Christ (British Museum). The book illustrations "all show Perseus wearing a winged helmet like Mercury, for which there is no textual justification, and carrying a small baroque parade shield, features which Titian may later have remembered."

== Poesie ==
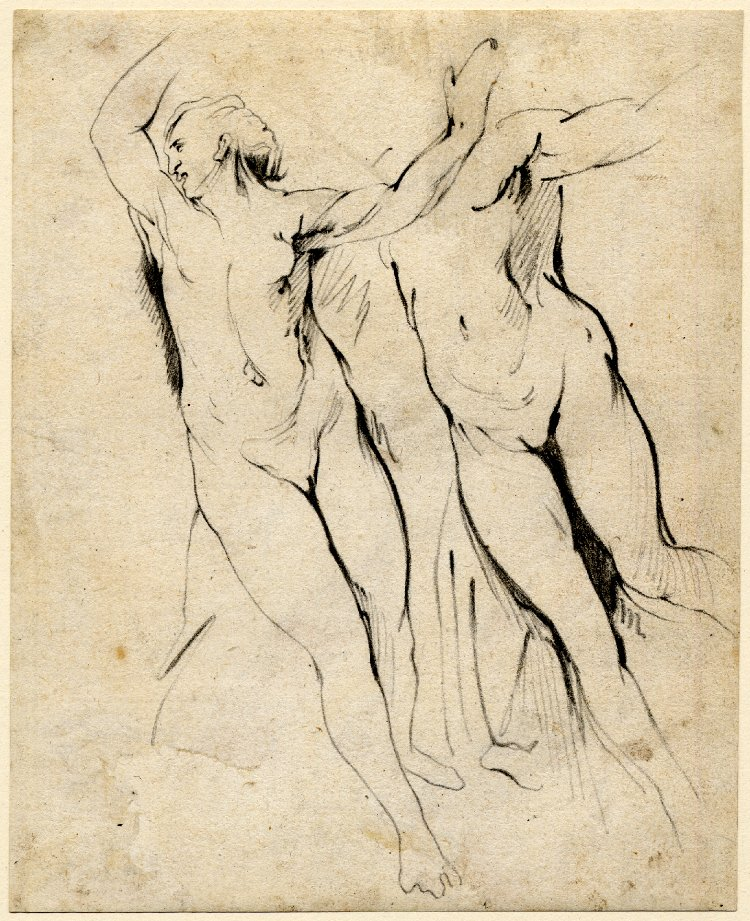
Copy in the British Museum of the drawing by Anthony van Dyck from his Italian sketchbook, now at Chatsworth House, perhaps after a drawing by Titian.

The first two of the poesie series were Danaë and Venus and Adonis, delivered in 1553 and late 1554 respectively. Both of these were repetitions with variations of compositions Titian had already painted in the previous decade for the Farnese family in Rome. In a letter from Titian to Philip accompanying the Venus and Adonis, he noted that the pair offered contrasting poses, and promised "another different view" in both Perseus and Andromeda and a Jason and Medea he intended to produce. These were to be the first original compositions in the series for Philip, but there is no trace of the Jason and Medea, which was presumably abandoned. Instead The Rape of Europa is designed as a companion to Perseus and Andromeda.

The composition of Perseus and Andromeda developed through several stages, which can be traced through x-rays and infra-red reflectography, and a surviving drawing. Some of the earlier elements can still be seen to the naked eye on close examination of the painting. At first Andromeda was on the right, in a fairly similar pose, but leaning from left to right as in the final picture. The arm to the left was raised above her head in a similar fashion, but the other arm more or less horizontal, and the head presumably looking to the centre. There is a drawing by Anthony van Dyck from his Italian sketchbook (now at Chatsworth House) recording such a figure, probably copying a lost drawing by Titian, a rarity by this stage in his career.

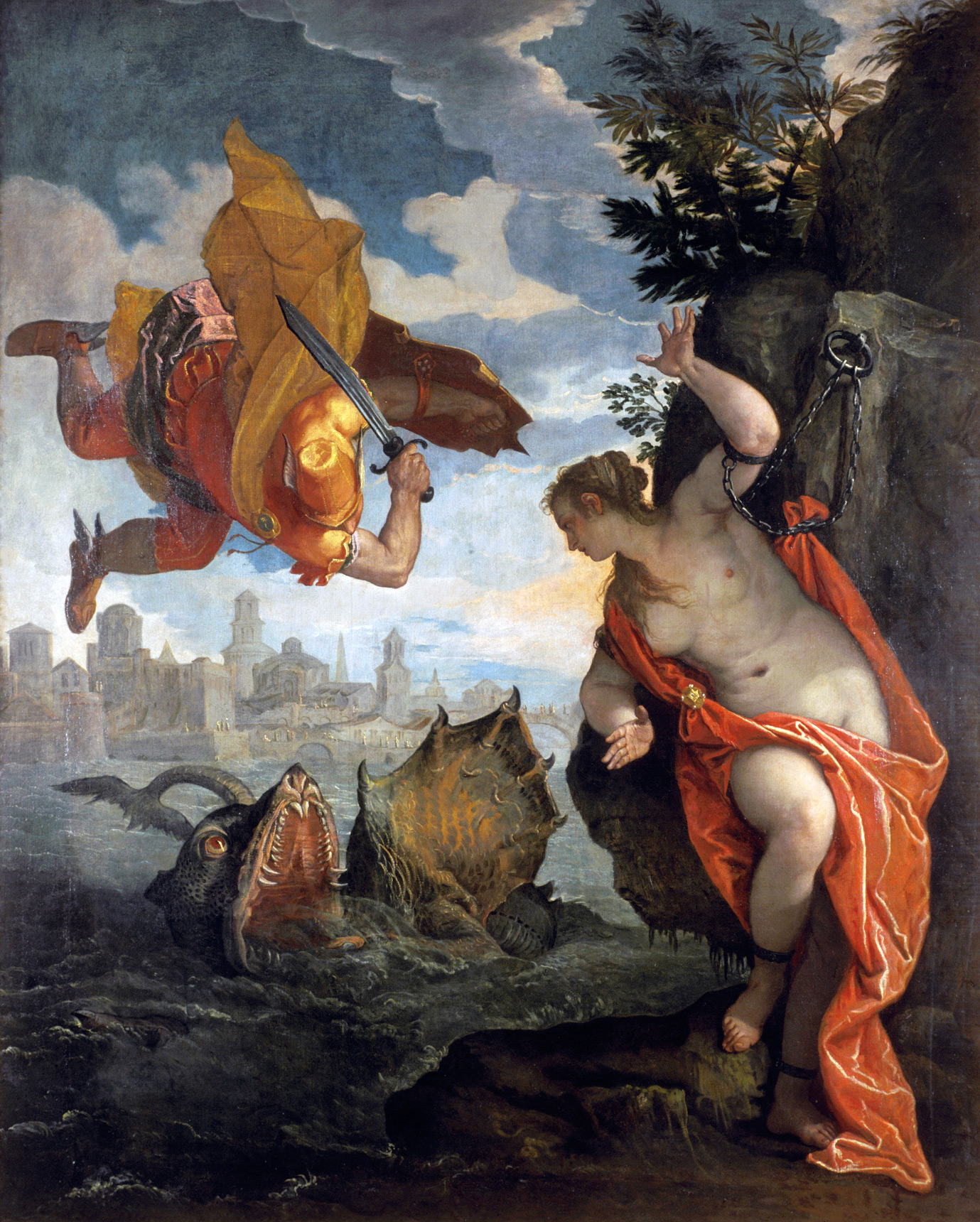
The painting by Paolo Veronese now in Rennes, 1576–1578, which is similar to the Titian when reversed

When Andromeda was moved to the left of the painting her pose was different from the final painting, more similar to the original one when she was on the right. There were several different positions, some taken no further than underdrawing, for Perseus' limbs, sword and shield. The monster originally rose higher out of the water.

In a dissident view, Rearick sees the Wallace collection canvas as a second version, the original being the one delivered to Philip in 1556, and now lost, with Andromeda on the right. He sees a painting by Paolo Veronese in Rennes as a paraphrase of this version.

A few years later, probably by 1558, Titian painted for Philip's aunt Mary of Hungary a St Margaret and the Dragon (now Prado) which, with the removal of Perseus, more clothes, and a cross carried by Saint Margaret, shows much the same situation, with a cliff, the sea, and a city across a bay.

== Provenance ==
Philip received the painting at Ghent in the Spanish Netherlands in September 1556. In 1574 Titian had still not been paid, according to a list he sent Philip's secretary and favourite Antonio Pérez. It appears to have left the Spanish royal collection before Philip's death in 1598 (the only poesie to do so), but was replaced by a careful copy, now in Gerona, Spain. It may have been given to Pérez, as other important paintings were. This would have been before his drastic fall from favour in 1579.

Alternatively it may have been given to the family of the court sculptors Leone Leoni and his son Pompeo, also given paintings by Philip. The Leoni family may have bought it when the collections of Pérez were dispersed. There are records of paintings of the subject in the collections of Pérez in 1585–86 (described as "grande" or large), of Leon Bautista Leoni on his death in 1605 ("a damaged Andromeda by Titian") and of his father Pompeo Leoni on his death in 1608 (described as large, and by Titian). All of these may refer to this painting, but this is not certain.

The painting was certainly in the collection of Anthony van Dyck, who may have acquired it from the Leoni family, who were based in Milan, during his years in Italy from 1621 to 1627. It was listed among his paintings on his death in London in 1641, and bought in 1646 by one of van Dyck's best customers, Algernon Percy, 10th Earl of Northumberland, together with Titian's Portrait of the Vendramin Family (now National Gallery). Northumberland paid £200 for the pair, and a further £80 in 1656. However, it does not seem to have been owned by Northumberland for long, and was in France by 1654, and possibly by 1649. In 1654 it was in the Paris house of the politician Louis Phélypeaux, seigneur de La Vrillière, where it remained until 1717, sold with the house in 1705.

It then joined the famous Orleans Collection of Philippe II, Duke of Orléans, Regent of France, to be re-united with four others of Titian's poesie, and two other versions by Titian of Venus and Adonis. By this time only Philip's versions of that and Danaë remained in the Spanish royal collection, and are now in the Prado. Like most of the rest of the Orleans Italian paintings, it moved to London where the collection was dispersed after the French Revolution in a complicated series of transactions, in some of which it was wrongly described as formerly in the collection of Charles I of England. In 1798 it was valued at 700 guineas but failed to sell, selling for 310 gn. in 1800, and £362 in 1815. This was much less than the £2,500 gn the Duke of Bridgewater, one of the syndicate handling the sales, paid for each of Diana and Actaeon and Diana and Callisto, other poesie.

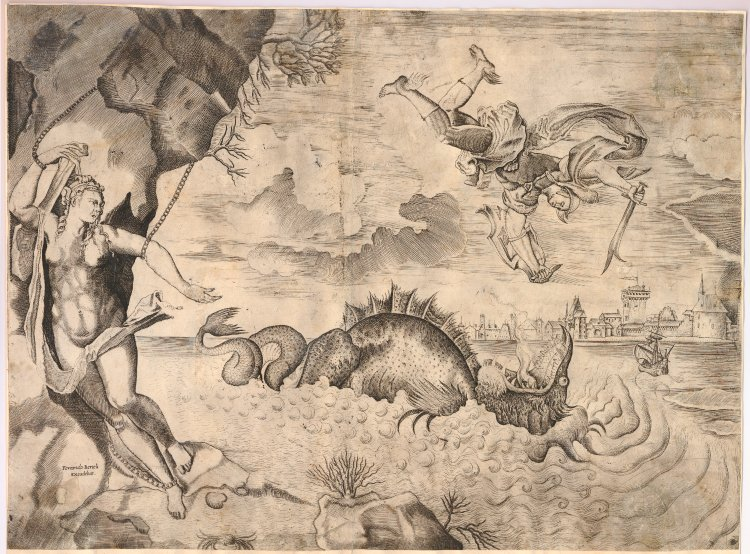
Engraving by Ferrando Bertelli

The 1815 sale was the last time the painting came to the market. It was bought by the Earl of Yarmouth, from 1822 Francis Seymour-Conway, 3rd Marquess of Hertford, father of the 4th Marquess, the main collector forming the Wallace Collection. The 3rd Marquess contributed relatively few pictures to the Wallace Collection, and those were mostly portraits.

The painting was initially not regarded as one of the stars of the collection. Between 1842 and about 1854 it was stored in the Pantechnicon repository in London, before moving to Hertford House, now home of the Wallace Collection, where it has remained. An 1870 inventory records it in the "Lumber Room" there, described as by Domenichino, and Ingamells notes disapprovingly that "between 1876 and 1897 [it] hung unglazed over a bath in Sir Richard Wallace's dressing room", before being correctly identified and rescued from the steam.

== Copies and prints ==
The painting was not copied by Titian or his workshop, as the first two poesie were, but later copies exist. When Philip II gave the painting away, a copy was made for the Spanish royal collection, which in 1882 was sent to the museum in Gerona, Spain. The Hermitage Museum has a copy that probably once belonged to Prince Eugene of Savoy. The Musée Ingres in Montauban, France has a 17th-century copy once in the Palace of Versailles, where it was recorded in 1683.

An engraving by the Venetian Ferrando Bertelli probably dates to the 1550s and is a close rendering, though extending the composition on all sides except the left, possibly reflecting the original size of the painting, which has been cut down to an unknown extent. Giovanni Battista Fontana (1524–1587) produced two prints, one dated 1564 and not very similar, the other closer to the Titian and undated. Neither are exactly reproductions. Illustrations to Ovid from the late 16th century on often adopt aspects, or the general layout of the painting, without being copies. The many paintings of the subject in later centuries tended to follow Titian's reduction of the subject to the two main figures and the monster, although not copying his composition. The subject became especially popular in the 19th century.

== Poesie mythological series ==
- Danaë, delivered to Philip in 1553, now Wellington Collection, with earlier and later versions.
- Venus and Adonis, Museo del Prado, delivered 1554, and several other versions
- Perseus and Andromeda, Wallace Collection, c. 1554–1556
- Diana and Actaeon, 1556–1559, owned jointly by London's National Gallery and the National Gallery of Scotland in Edinburgh
- Diana and Callisto, 1556–1559, owned jointly by London's National Gallery and the National Gallery of Scotland in Edinburgh
- The Rape of Europa, c. 1560–1562, Isabella Stewart Gardner Museum
- The Death of Actaeon, National Gallery, never delivered, and often not counted in the series, c. 1559 onwards
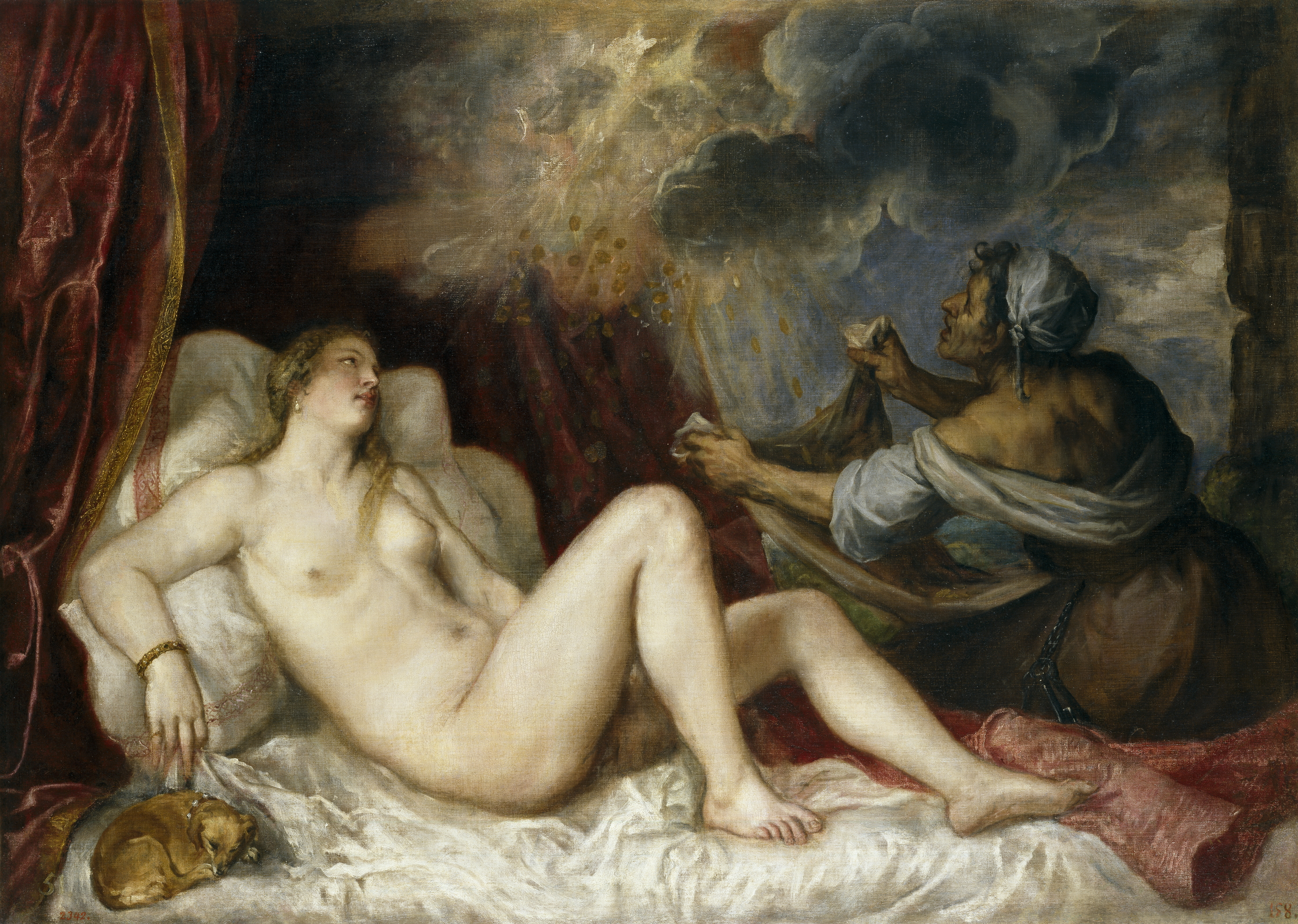
Danaë

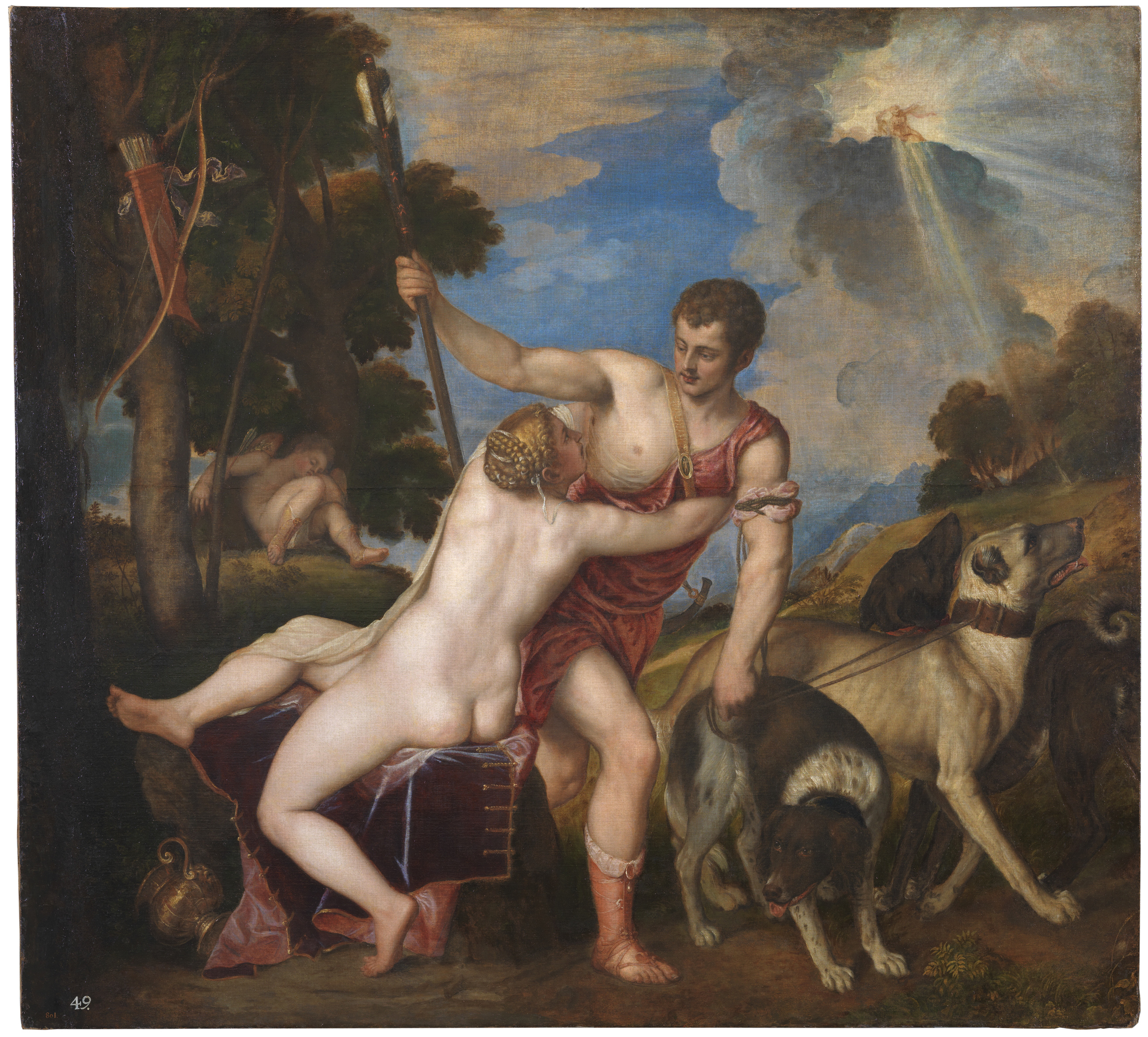
Venus and Adonis

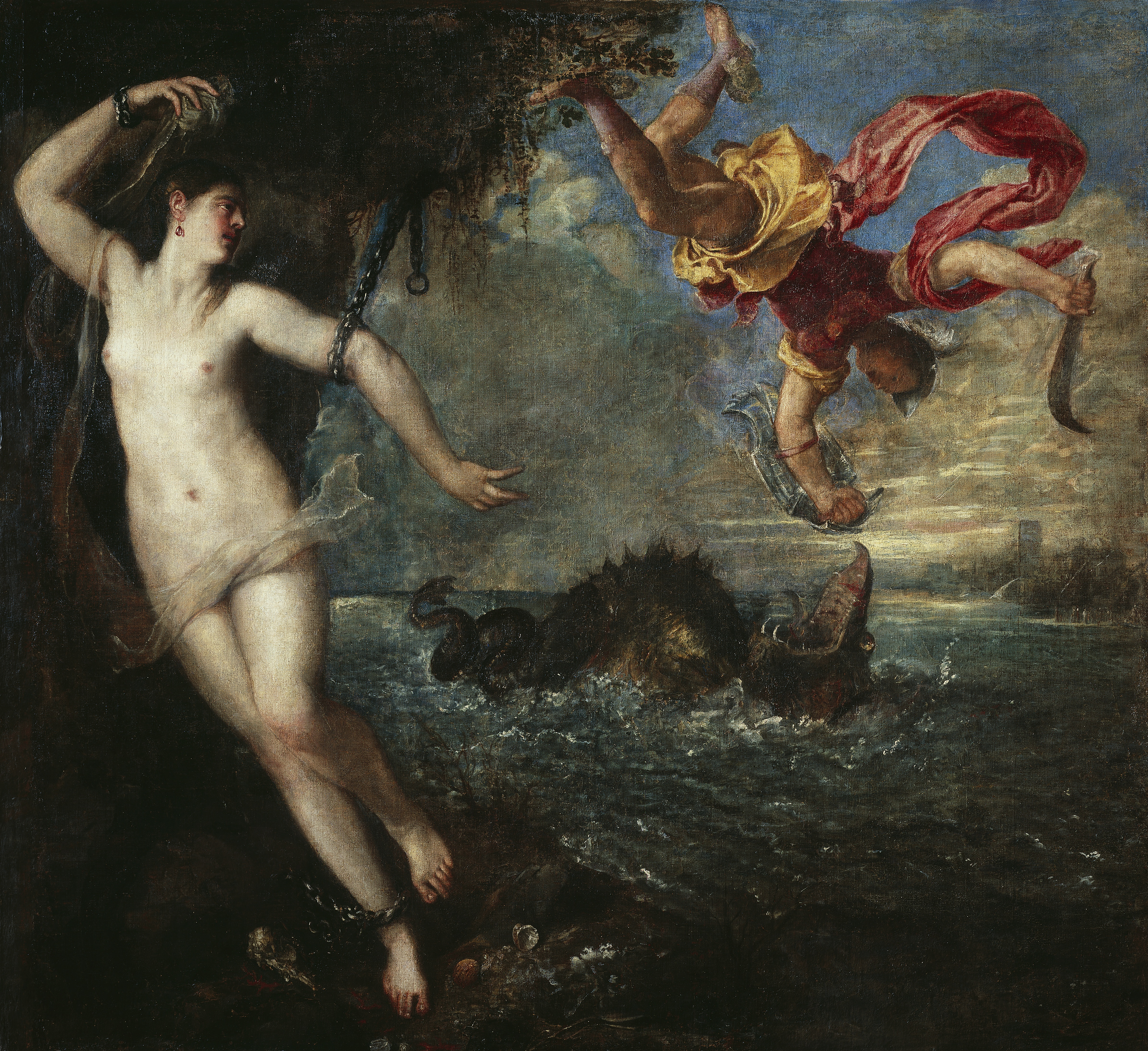
Perseus and Andromeda

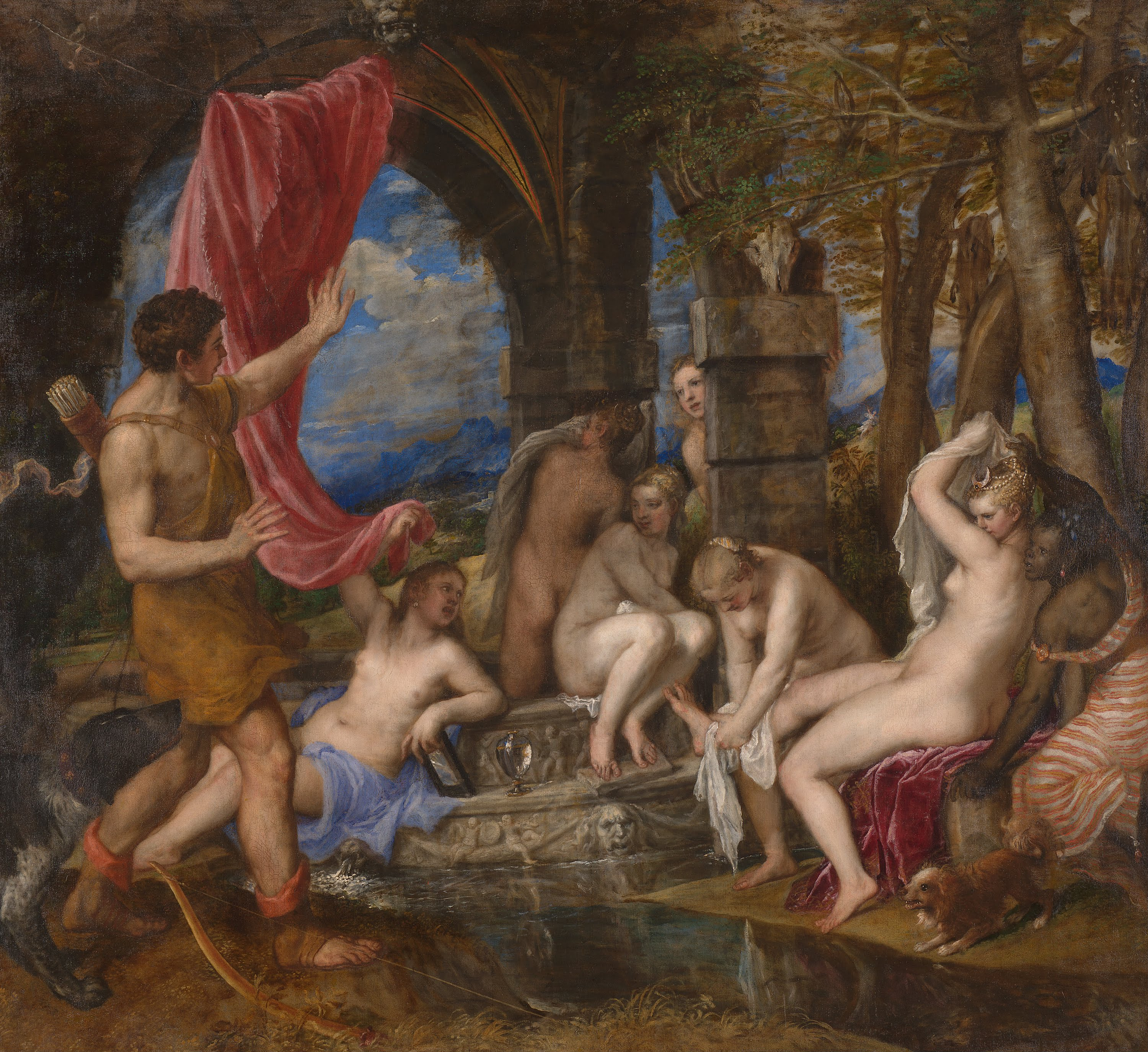
Diana and Actaeon

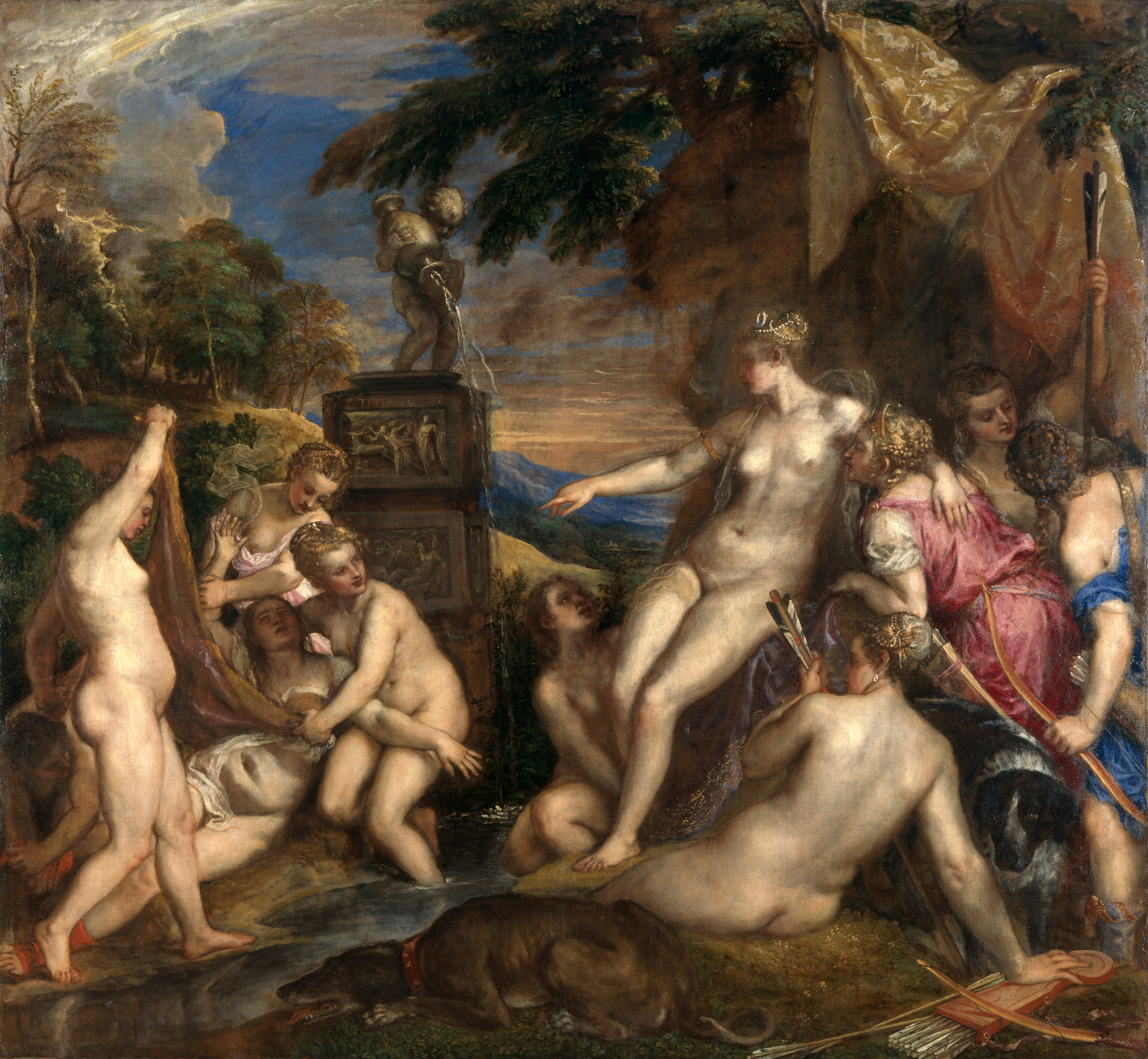
Diana and Callisto

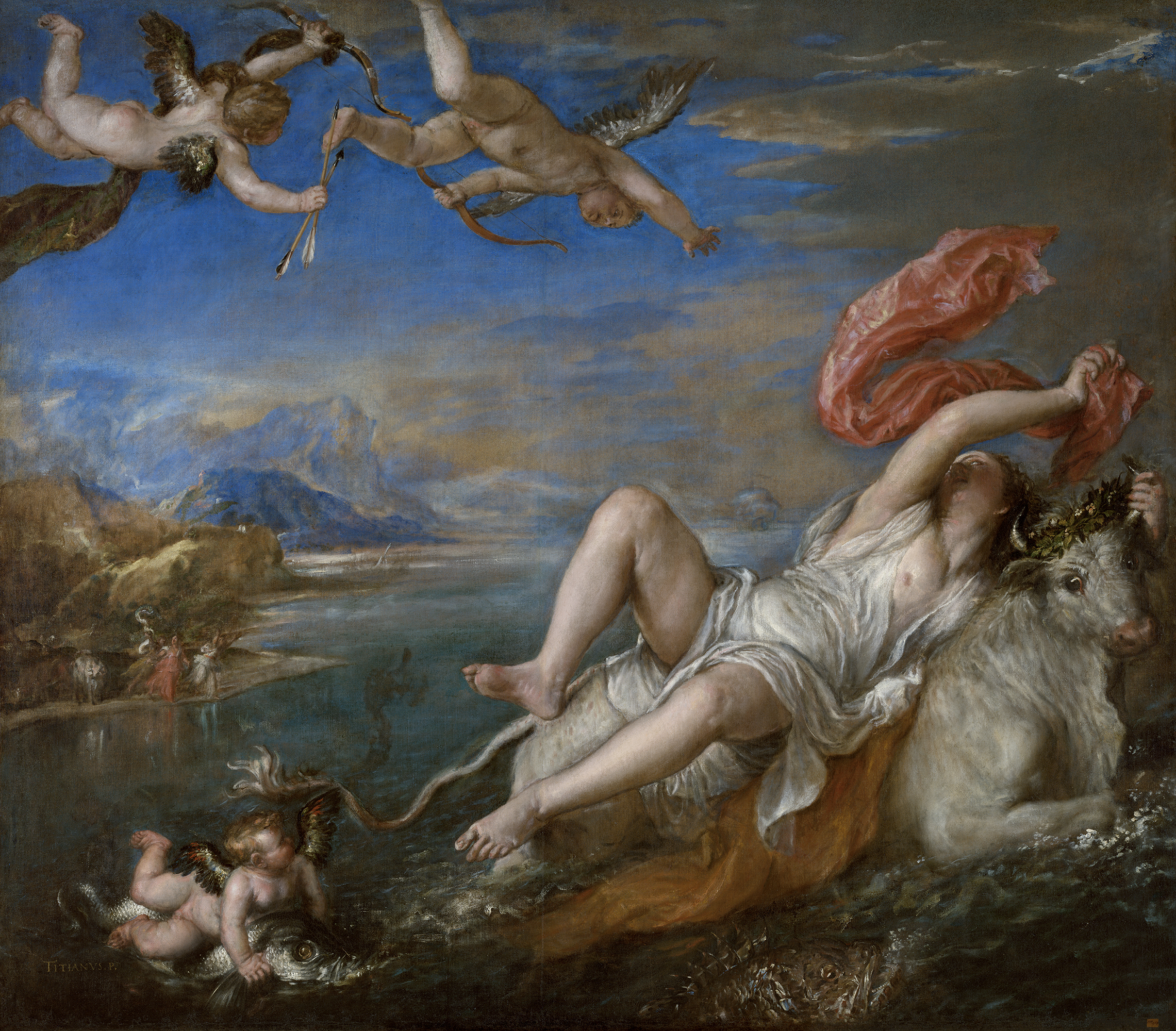
The Rape of Europa

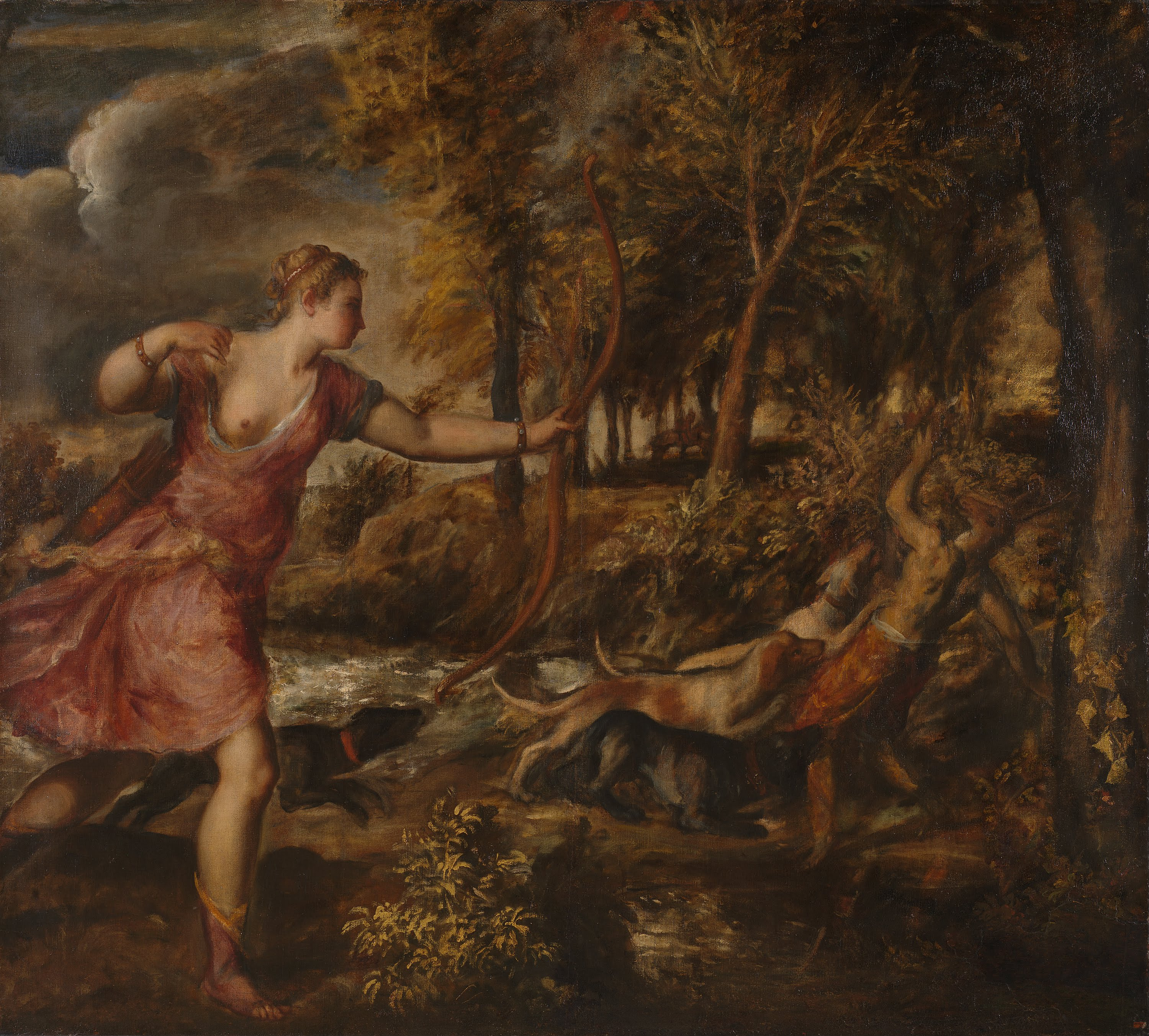
The Death of Actaeon

== See also ==
- List of works by Titian
- Perseus and Andromeda (Rubens), a 1622 painting by Peter Paul Rubens
- Perseus and Andromeda (Leighton), an 1891 painting by Frederic Leighton, 1st Baron Leighton

== Sources ==
- Brigstocke, Hugh; Italian and Spanish Paintings in the National Gallery of Scotland, 2nd Edn, 1993, National Galleries of Scotland, ISBN 0903598221
- Hale, Sheila, Titian, His Life, 2012, Harper Press, ISBN 978-0-00717582-6
- Hall, James, Hall's Dictionary of Subjects and Symbols in Art, 1996 (2nd edn.), John Murray, ISBN 0719541476
- Ingamells, John, The Wallace Collection, Catalogue of Pictures, Vol I, British, German, Italian, Spanish, Wallace Collection, 1985, ISBN 0900785160. PDF's of each relevant opening of the book are available under the "media" tab on the Wallace Collection webpage.
- Penny, Nicholas, National Gallery Catalogues (new series): The Sixteenth Century Italian Paintings, Volume II, Venice 1540–1600, 2008, National Gallery Publications Ltd, ISBN 1857099133
- Rearick, W. R. "Titian's Later Mythologies." 23, Artibus Et Historiae 17, no. 33 (1996): 23–67. doi:10.2307/1483551
- Wallace Collection page
