= Diana and Callisto =

Painting by Titian in London and Edinburgh

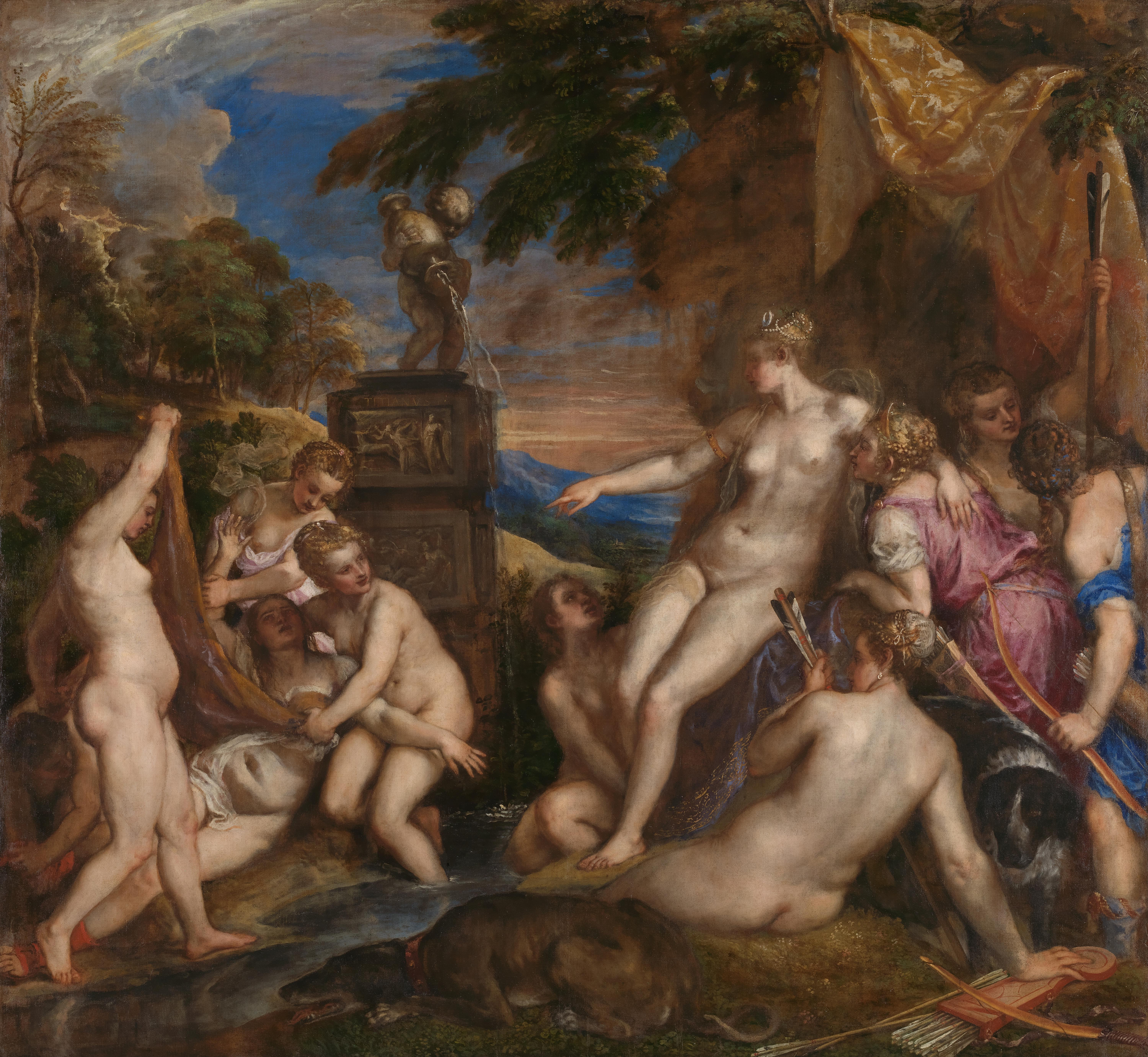
- Artist: Titian
- Year: 1556–1559
- Medium: Oil on canvas
- Dimensions: 187 cm × 204.5 cm (74 in × 80.5 in)
- Location: National Gallery and Scottish National Gallery, London and Edinburgh

Diana and Callisto is a painting completed between 1556 and 1559 by the Italian late Renaissance artist Titian. It portrays the moment in which the goddess Diana discovers that her maid Callisto has become pregnant by Jupiter. The painting was jointly purchased by the National Gallery and the Scottish National Gallery for £45 million in March 2012. Along with its companion painting Diana and Actaeon it is displayed on an alternating basis between London and Edinburgh. There is a later version by Titian and his workshop in the Kunsthistorisches Museum, in Vienna.

== History ==
Diana and Callisto is part of a series of seven famous canvasses, the "poesies", depicting mythological scenes from Ovid's Metamorphoses painted for Philip II of Spain after Maximilian II, Holy Roman Emperor had declined Titian's offer to paint them for him. The work remained in the Spanish royal collection until 1704 when King Philip V gave it to the French ambassador. It was soon acquired by Philippe II, Duke of Orléans, nephew of Louis XIV, and Regent of France during the minority of Louis XV, for his collection, one of the finest ever assembled. After the French Revolution, the Orleans collection was sold to a Brussels banker by Louis Philippe II, Duke of Orléans in 1791, two years before he was guillotined.

It was sent to London for sale in 1793 and purchased by a syndicate of three aristocrats, the leader of which, the canal and coal-magnate Francis Egerton, 3rd Duke of Bridgewater, bought a large number of paintings for himself, including Diana and Callisto and Diana and Actaeon (both from the "poesie" series), eight paintings by Poussin, three Raphaels and Rembrandt's "Self-Portrait, aged 51".

=== Sutherland collection ===
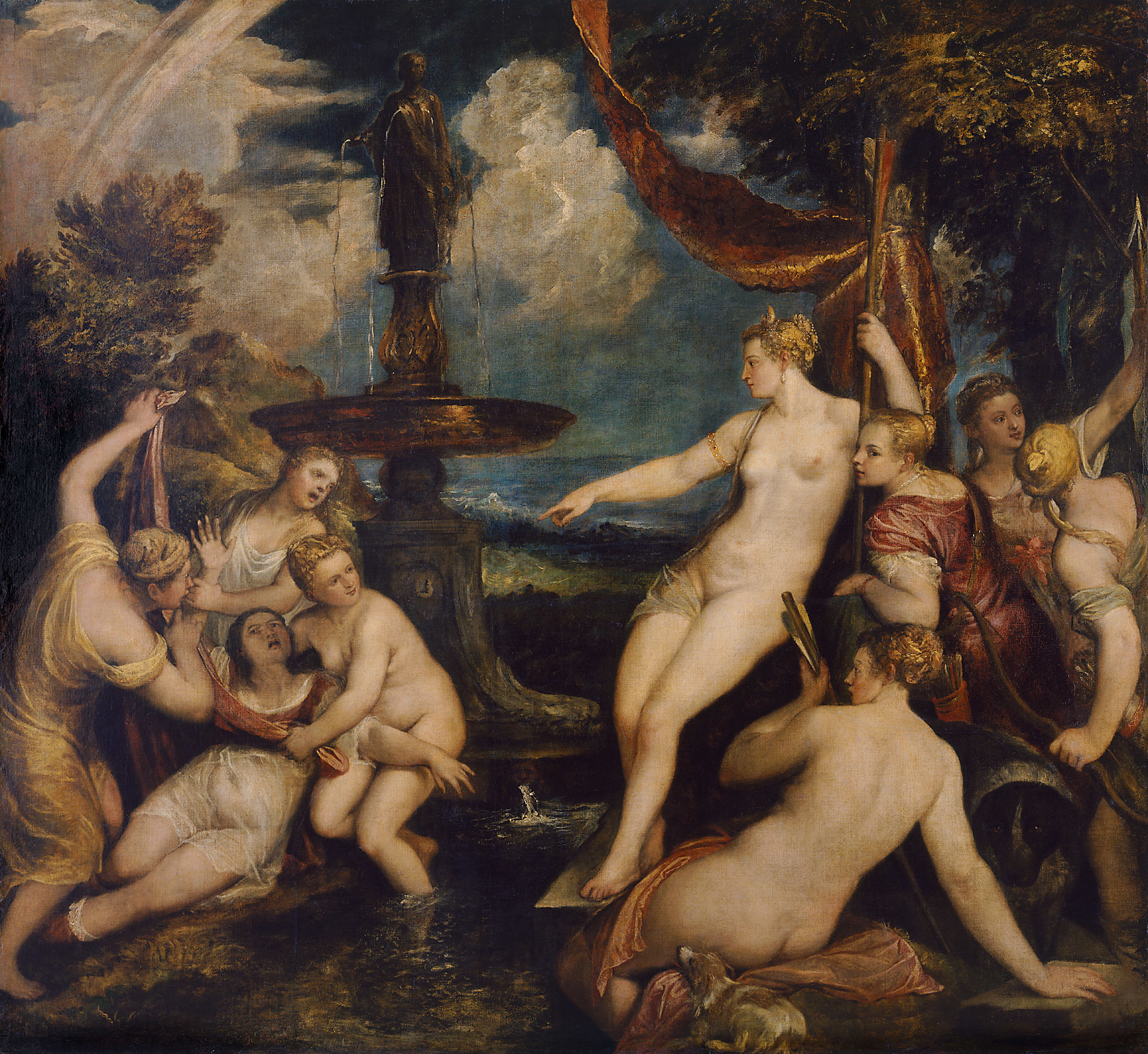
The Vienna version, which has some alterations to some of the figures, although the underdrawing is almost identical to the prime version in London.

Bridgewater was probably inspired to buy the paintings by his nephew, Earl Gower, the ancestor of the Dukes of Sutherland. Certainly, on Bridgewater's death five years after the purchase, he bequeathed the Titians and the rest of his collection to Gower, who put it on display to the public in his Bridgewater House in London where it would remain on public display for the next century and a half. Upon first seeing the collection there, William Hazlitt wrote "I was staggered when I saw the works ... A new sense came upon me, a new heaven and a new Earth stood before me." At the outbreak of the Second World War in September 1939, the collection was moved from London to Scotland. Since 1945, both Diana and Actaeon and Diana and Callisto (with other paintings from the collection, known collectively as "the Bridgewater loan" or "the Sutherland Loan") have resided at the National Gallery of Scotland (NGS) in Edinburgh. Besides Hazlitt, during their time on public display the two Titian paintings have inspired such other artists as J. M. W. Turner and Lucian Freud – Freud has described the pair as "simply the most beautiful pictures in the world".

=== National acquisition ===
The Sutherland collection has passed by descent to Francis Egerton, 7th Duke of Sutherland, most of whose wealth is contained in the paintings collection, but who, in late August 2008 announced his wish to sell some of the collection in order to diversify his assets. He at first offered them as a pair to the British national galleries at £100m (a third of their overall estimated market price) if they could demonstrate by the end of 2008 that they could raise that sum – if not, the pair or other paintings from the Bridgewater collection would be put on public auction in 2009. The NGS and the National Gallery in London announced that they would combine forces to raise £50m (or a demonstration that this money could be raised) to purchase Diana and Actaeon paid over three years in instalments and then £50m for Diana and Callisto to be paid for similarly from 2013.

Though the campaign received criticism from John Tusa and Nigel Carrington for the Duke's motives and for distracting from funding art students, it gained press support in the UK. On 14 October 2008, the appeal received £1 million from the Art Fund and on 19 November this was followed by £10 million from the National Heritage Memorial Fund.

Speculation began when the original 31 December 2008 deadline passed without news and the Scottish Government's announcement of a contribution of £17.5 million in January 2009 triggered a political row, with Ian Davidson questioning the deal during the 2008 financial crisis. There was also controversy over attempts to dilute the guarantee that the duke would sell no other paintings from the Sutherland Loan should the two Titians be bought. Finally, on 2 February 2009 it was announced that, thanks to the deadline being extended to raise more funds and finalise the payment plan for the Diana and Callisto, £50m had been raised and the painting would be acquired. Nicholas Penny, Director of the National Gallery stated that many who had contributed to the Diana and Actaeon appeal had done so "on the understanding" that Diana and Callisto would also be purchased, but that raising the second £50m was "not going to be easily raised. We do believe we can do it, and we've given it a great deal of thought. It's not just reckless gambling."

However, on 23 October 2011, the Scottish government announced it would not make a contribution to the Diana and Callisto appeal, referring to its contribution to the Diana and Actaeon appeal by stating that "this government has made its contribution to the campaign". After a lengthy fundraising campaign, the National Gallery and the National Galleries of Scotland purchased the painting for £45 million in March 2012, the asking price having been reduced by £5 million by the Duke of Sutherland – £15 million had been raised by individual and trust donations, £2 million from the Art Fund and £3 million from the Heritage Lottery Fund. The remaining £25 million came from the National Gallery's reserves, leaving them (in its director's words) "depleted".

The painting is displayed with Diana and Actaeon on a rotating basis in London and Edinburgh, starting with London from 1 March 2012 – for the Diana and Callisto, this will be on a 60:40 basis in favour of London, to reflect the National Gallery's greater monetary contribution to the purchase.

== Painting materials ==
Titian employed an exceedingly wide palette consisting of nearly all pigments of the Renaissance period, such as natural ultramarine, vermilion, malachite, verdigris, ochres, lead-tin-yellow, smalt, and carmine.

== Titian's poesie series for Philip II ==
- Danaë, delivered to Philip 1553, now Wellington Collection, with earlier and later versions.
- Venus and Adonis, Museo del Prado, delivered 1554, and several other versions
- Diana and Actaeon, 1556–1559, owned jointly by London's National Gallery and the National Gallery of Scotland in Edinburgh
- Diana and Callisto, 1556–1559, owned jointly by London's National Gallery and the National Gallery of Scotland in Edinburgh
- Perseus and Andromeda, Wallace Collection, c. 1553–1562
- The Rape of Europa, c. 1560–1562, Isabella Stewart Gardner Museum
- The Death of Actaeon, National Gallery, never delivered and not always counted in the series, c. 1559 onwards
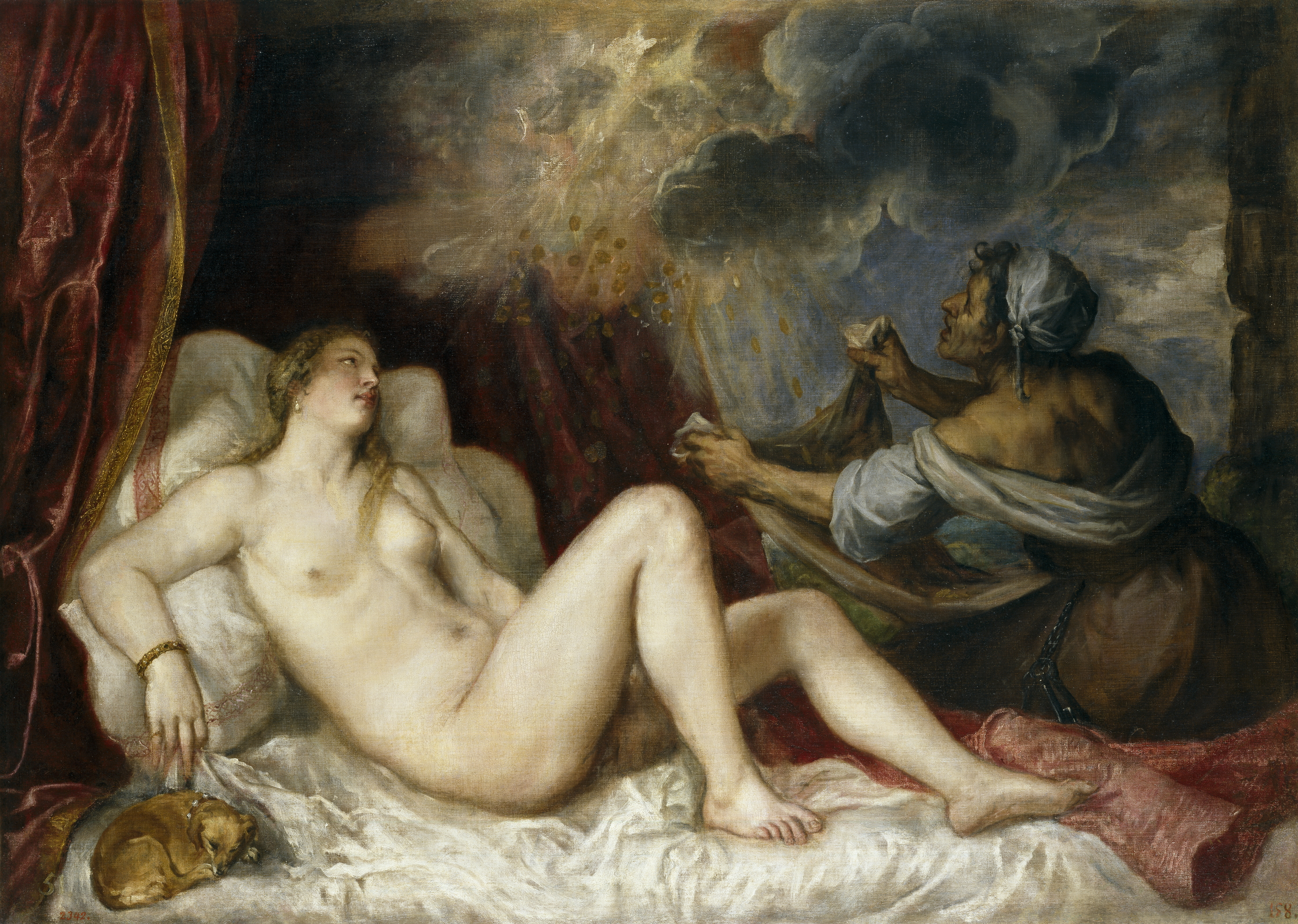
Danaë

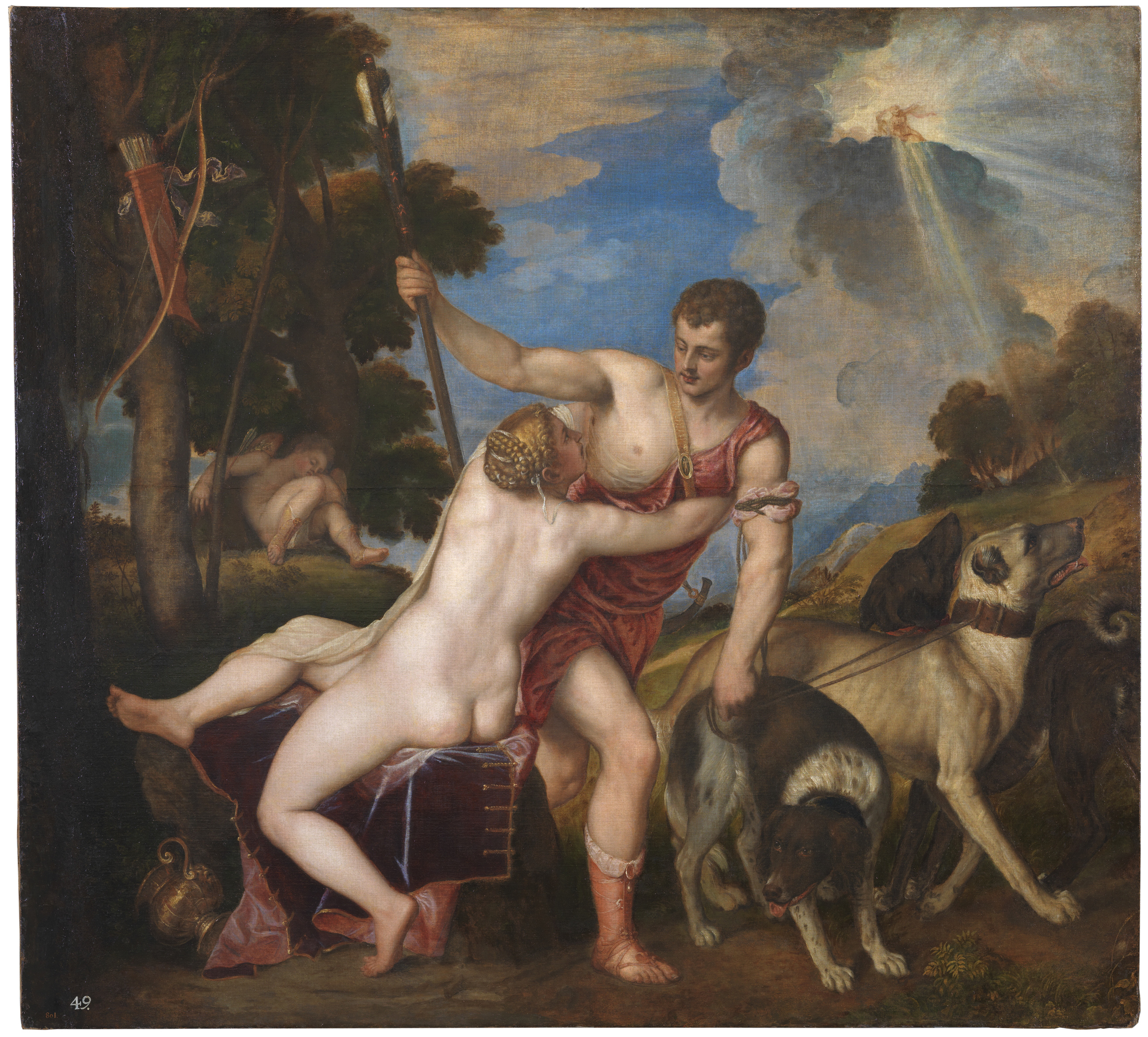
Venus and Adonis

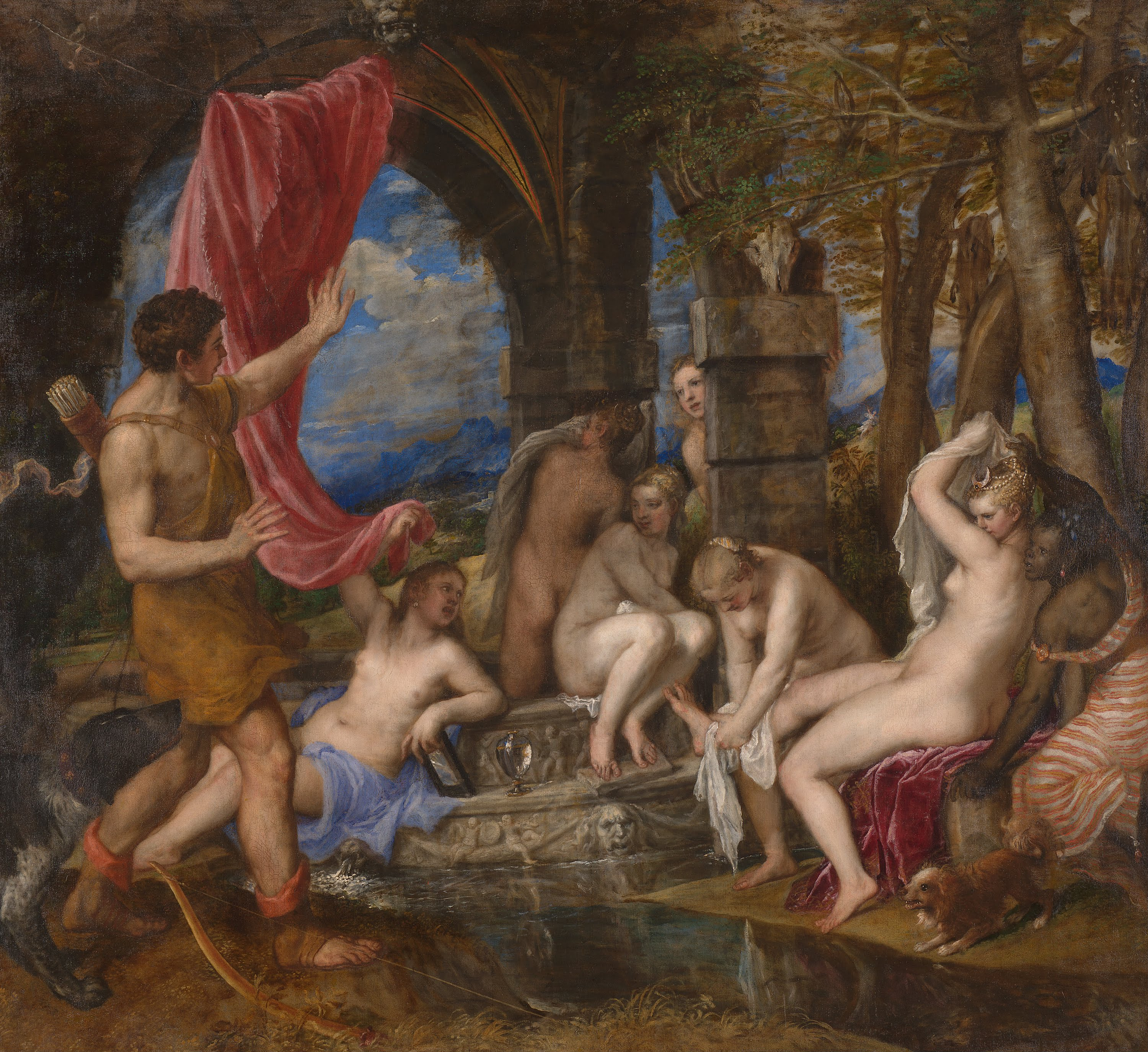
Diana and Actaeon

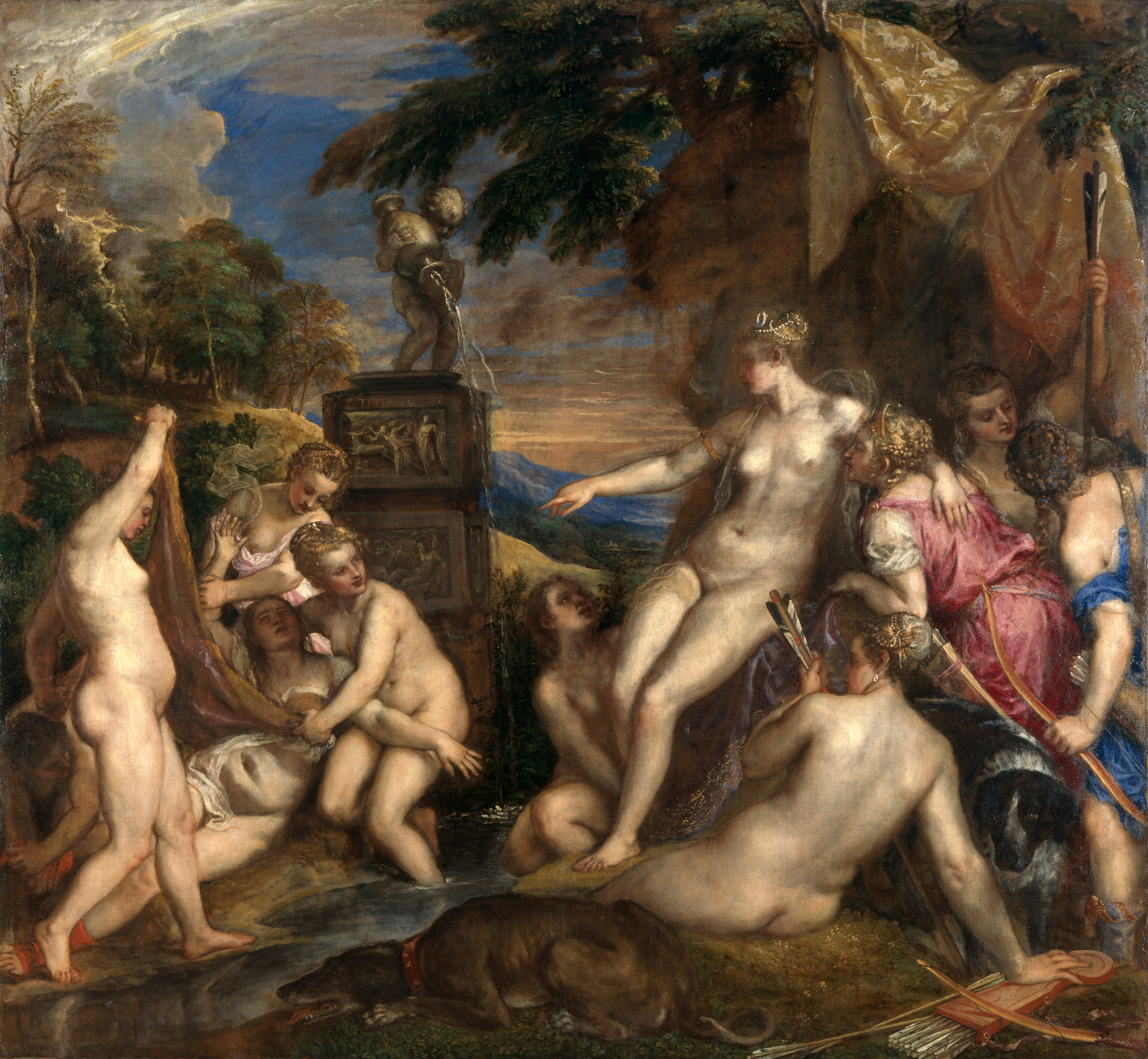
Diana and Callisto

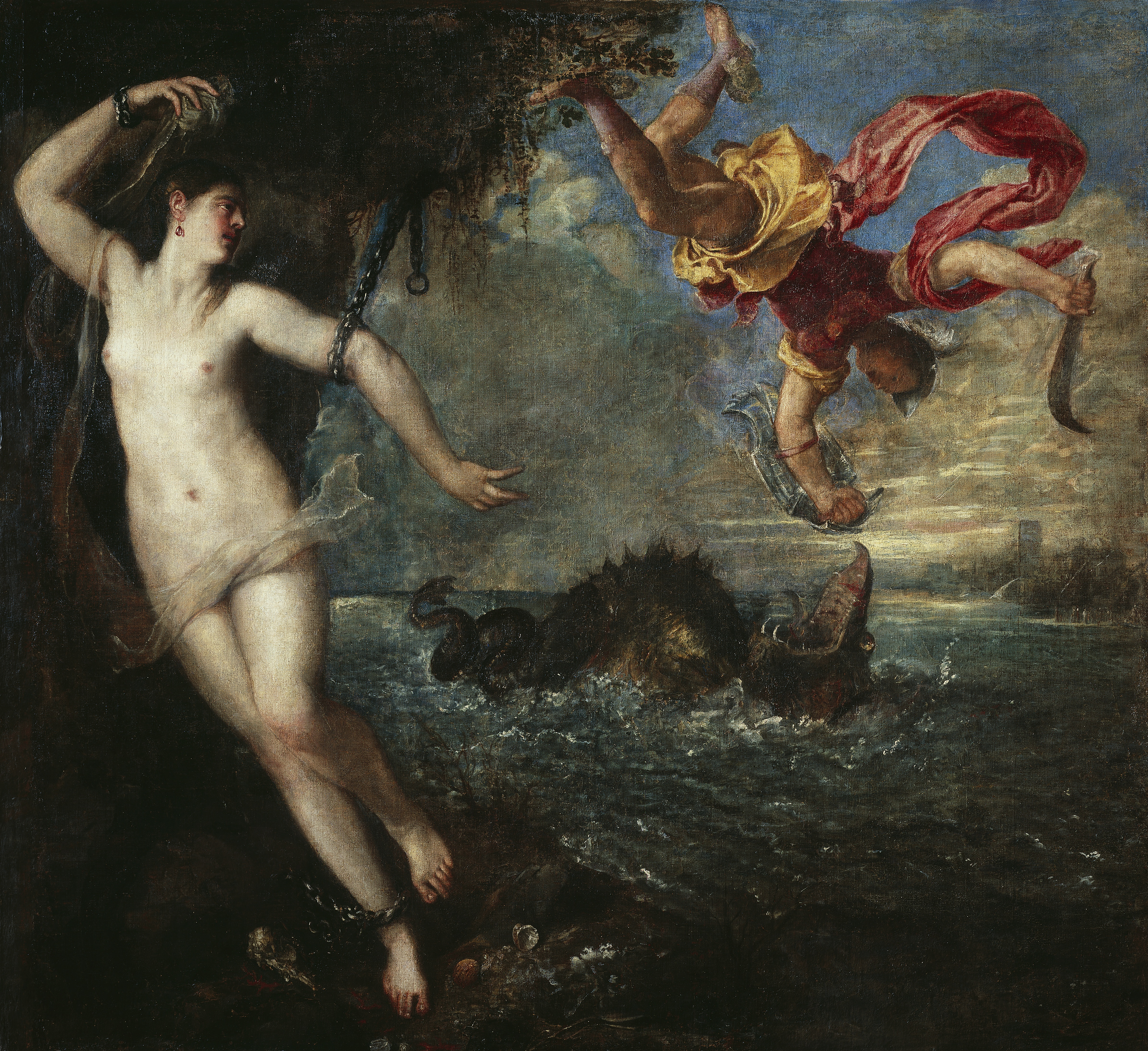
Perseus and Andromeda

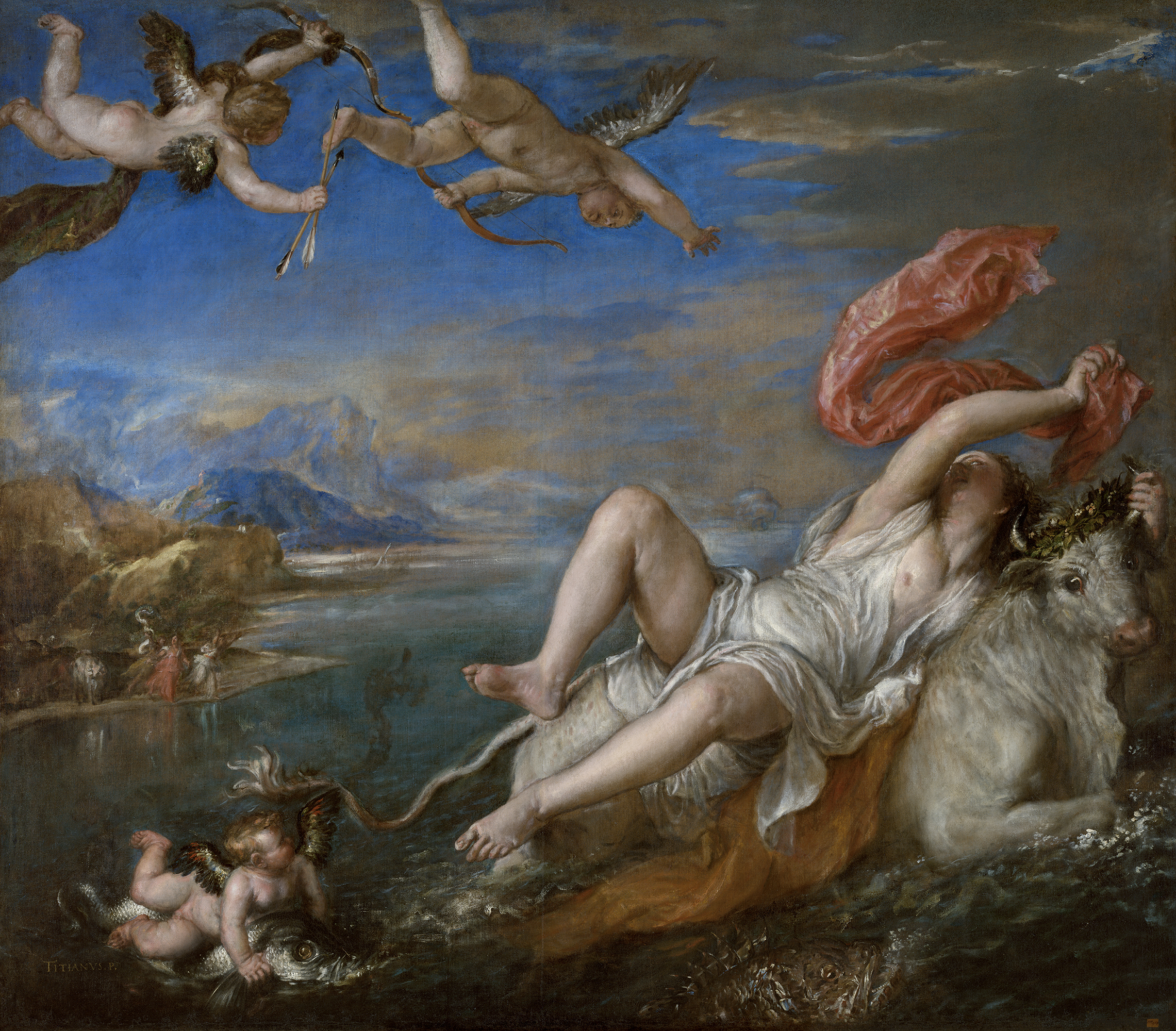
The Rape of Europa

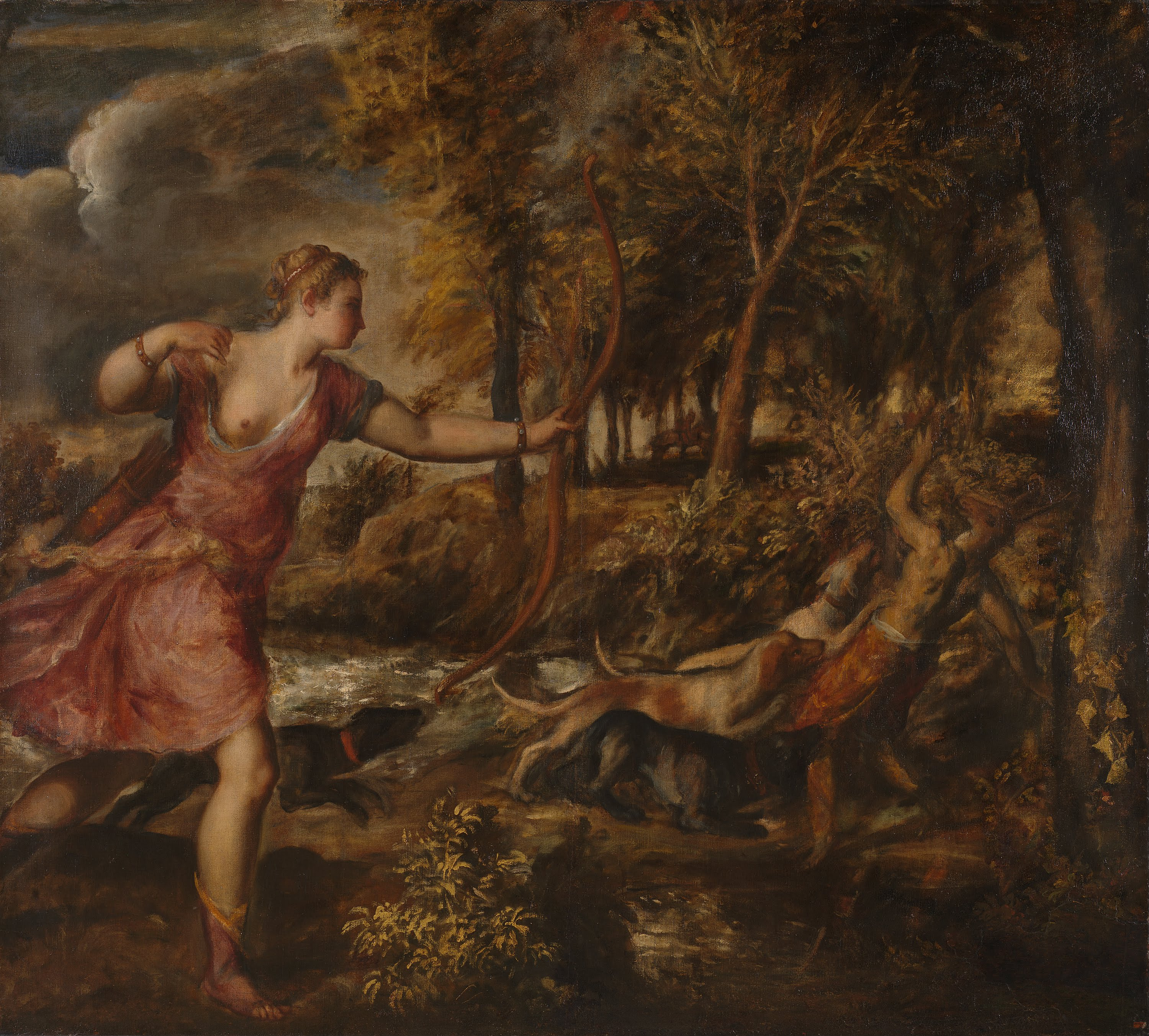
The Death of Actaeon

== See also ==
- List of most expensive paintings
- List of works by Titian
- 100 Great Paintings, 1980 BBC series

== Sources ==
- Brigstocke, Hugh; Italian and Spanish Paintings in the National Gallery of Scotland, 2nd Edn, 1993, National Galleries of Scotland, ISBN 0-903598-22-1
