= The Rape of Europa (Titian) =

Painting by Titian

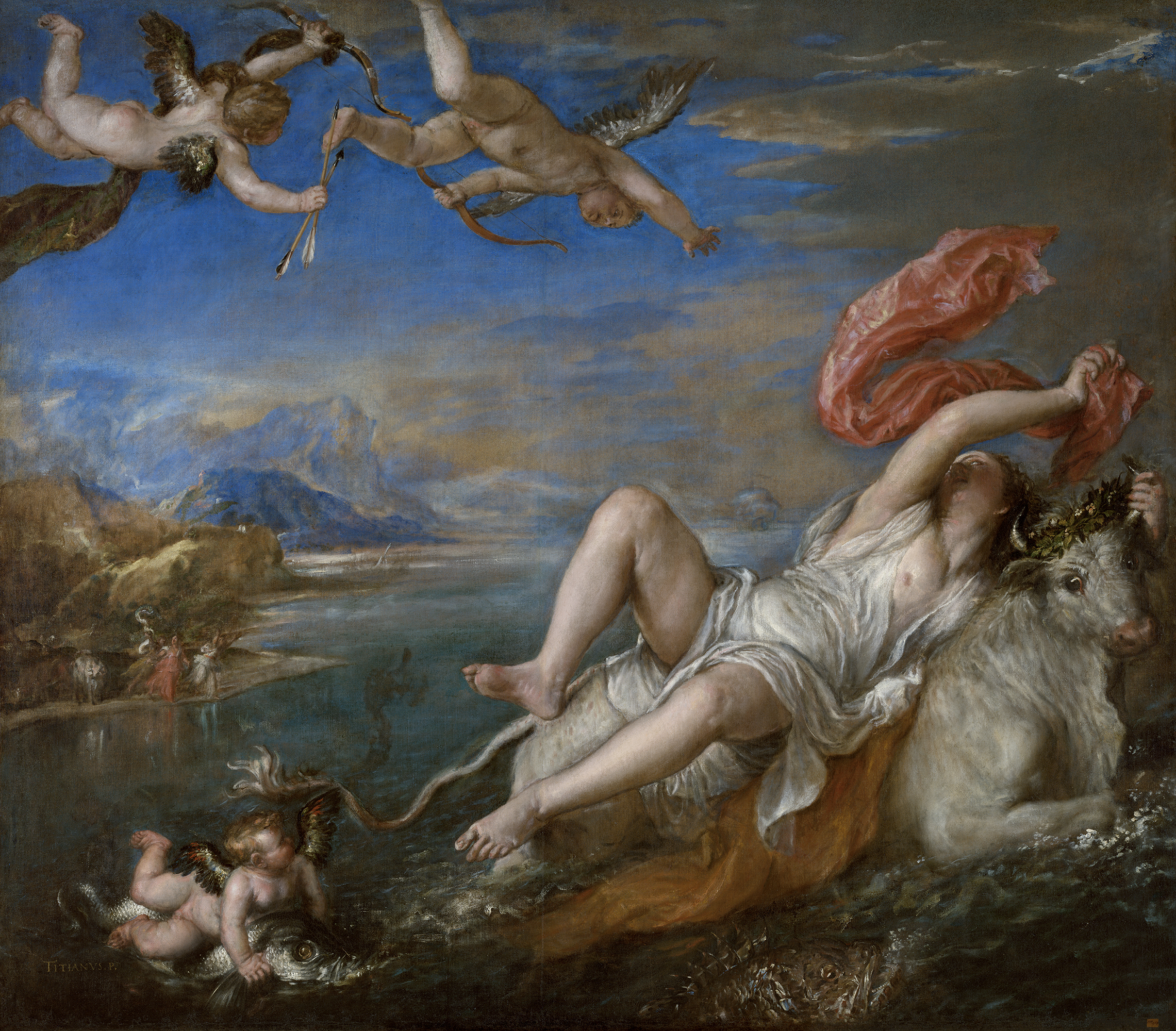
- Artist: Titian
- Year: c. 1560–1562
- Medium: Oil on canvas
- Dimensions: 178 cm × 205 cm (70 in × 81 in)
- Location: Isabella Stewart Gardner Museum, Boston

The Rape of Europa is a painting by the Venetian artist Titian, painted c. 1560–1562. It is in the permanent collection of the Isabella Stewart Gardner Museum, in Boston. The oil-on-canvas painting measures 178 by 205 centimetres (70 in × 81 in).

== Subject ==
The title of the painting refers to the mythological story of the abduction of Europa by Zeus (Jupiter to the Romans). In the myth, the god assumed the form of a bull and enticed Europa to climb onto his back. Once there, the bull rode into the sea and carried her to Crete, where he revealed his real identity. Europa became the first Queen of Crete, and had three children with Zeus. When Zeus finally departed Crete, he gifted her three parting gifts, a necklace, a javelin, and a bronze guard.

The painting depicts Europa on the back of the bull, just off the shore of her homeland. One of her attendants in the background is wearing a pink garment similar to the one Europa holds in her hand. Titian seems to emphasize that this is a scene of rape (abduction): Europa is sprawled helplessly on her back, her clothes in disarray. Furthermore, the position of legs indicates at minimum that she is precariously balanced and potentially that she is kicking and attempting to free herself from Zeus.

Although the source of Titian's inspiration is thought to have been based on the scene from Book II in Ovid's Metamorphoses, a more direct influence might be a description of a painting of the rape of Europa found in Achilles Tatius's novel, Leucippe and Clitophon. Achilles Tatius's novel was translated into Italian and printed in 1546 in Venice, only a few years before Titian was thought to have painted The Rape of Europa. Achilles Tatius's description of the dolphins, Europa's scarf, a Cupid, Europa's covering, and "her position on the back of the bull—not with a leg on each side but with her feet on the bull's right side and her left hand on his horn" is echoed in Titian's portrayal of the same scene. Ovid's translation, notes the color of the bull and the position of her body, on the bull. "His color is like snow and "Muscles bulge around his neck". This is similar to the physical details Titian shows.

== History ==
The painting was one of the "poesie" series painted by Titian for Philip II of Spain. With Diana and Callisto and Diana and Actaeon, both now shared by London and Edinburgh; it was one of three Titian poesie given by Philip V of Spain to the French ambassador, the Duke of Gramont, who in turn presented them to Philippe II, Duke of Orléans, Regent of France from 1715 to 1723.

For most of the 18th century it was in the Orleans Collection in Paris. The painting was included in the 1857 Manchester Art Treasures exhibition. It was purchased by Bernard Berenson on behalf of art collector Isabella Stewart Gardner in 1896. It was not stolen during the Isabella Stewart Gardner Museum theft in 1990, despite being the most expensive painting in Boston at the time. From August 12, 2021, to January 2, 2022, the Isabella Stewart Gardner Museum displayed all six Titian poesie in an exhibit titled Titian: Women, Myth & Power. It was the first time since the 16th century that the six paintings were physically united.

== Scholarly interpretation ==
Although the act of sexual violence is not depicted in the painting, it is implied through Europa's open-legged posture and her expression of fear as she is dragged off by Zeus. Her danger is also implied by her waving a red silk scarf and by the sea monster in the foreground of the painting. In other parts of the painting, two putti in the sky chase after Europa, and one rides on a dolphin in the sea.

Yael Even has theorized that Titian could have created this painting not due to any particular attachment to the subject, but in order to assert his abilities as a painter.

== Copy by Rubens ==
The Rape of Europa
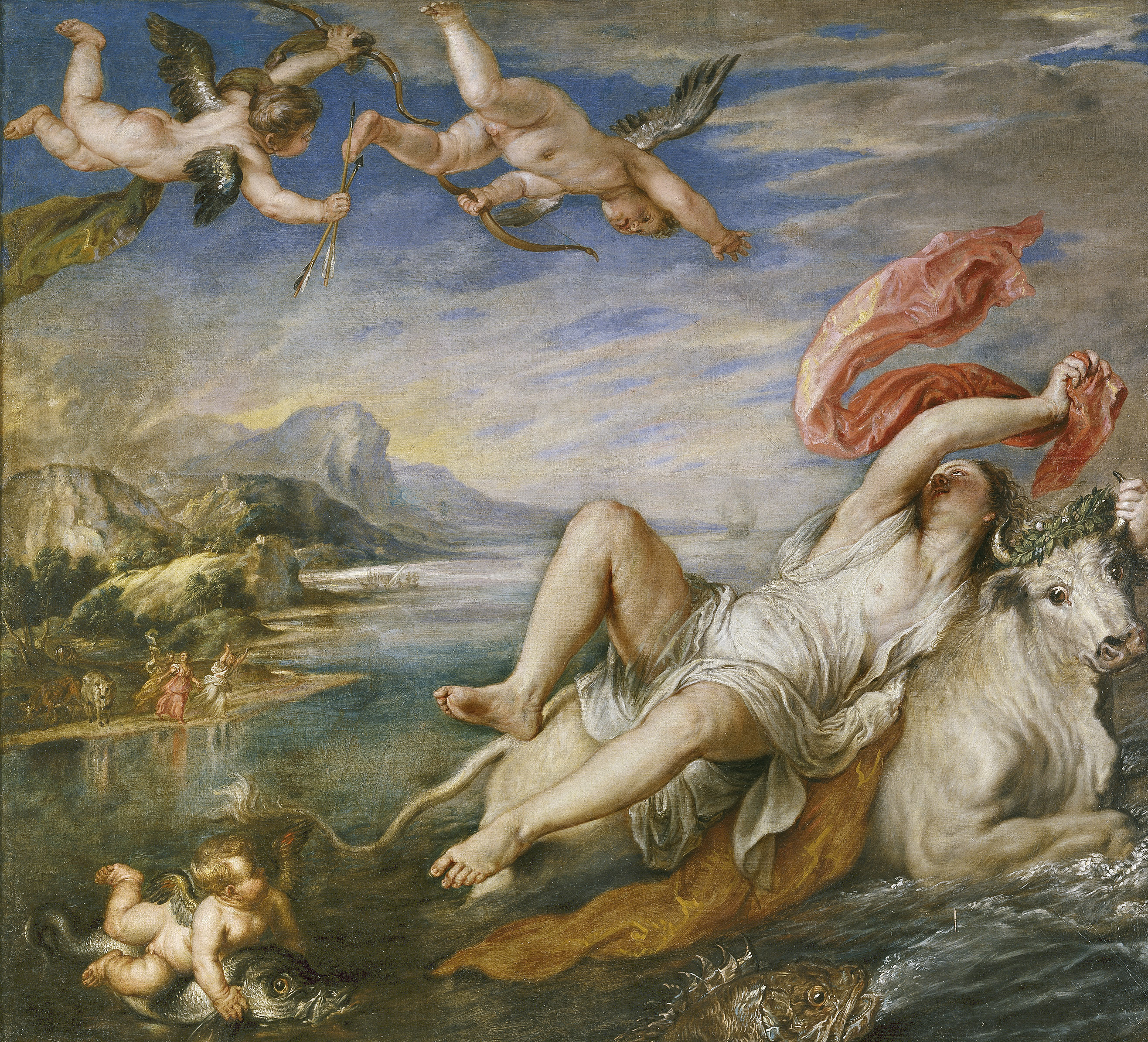
- Artist: Peter Paul Rubens
- Year: 1628–1629
- Dimensions: 182.5 cm × 201.5 cm (71.9 in × 79.3 in)
- Location: Prado Museum, Madrid

Peter Paul Rubens made a faithful copy of the painting in 1628–1629 that now hangs in the Museo del Prado.

== See also ==
- List of works by Titian
