= Venus and Mars =

Venus and Mars may refer to:

== Art ==
- Venus and Mars (sculpture), a 2nd-century sculpture of Hadrian and Sabina as the deities
- Venus and Mars (Botticelli), a 15th-century painting by Sandro Botticelli
- Venus and Mars (Veronese), a 16th-century painting by Paolo Veronese

== Film ==
- Venus and Mars (2001 film), a German film with Lynn Redgrave
- Venus and Mars (2007 film), a South Korean film

== Music ==
- Venus and Mars (Wings album) (1975)
  - "Venus and Mars/Rock Show", a 1975 single by Wings
- Venus & Mars (Jett Rebel album)

== See also ==
- The Loves of Mars and Venus, an 18th-century ballet
- Mars & Venus, a 2007 Norwegian film by Eva Dahr with Pia Tjelta and Thorbjørn Harr
