= Orleans Collection =

Former French art collection

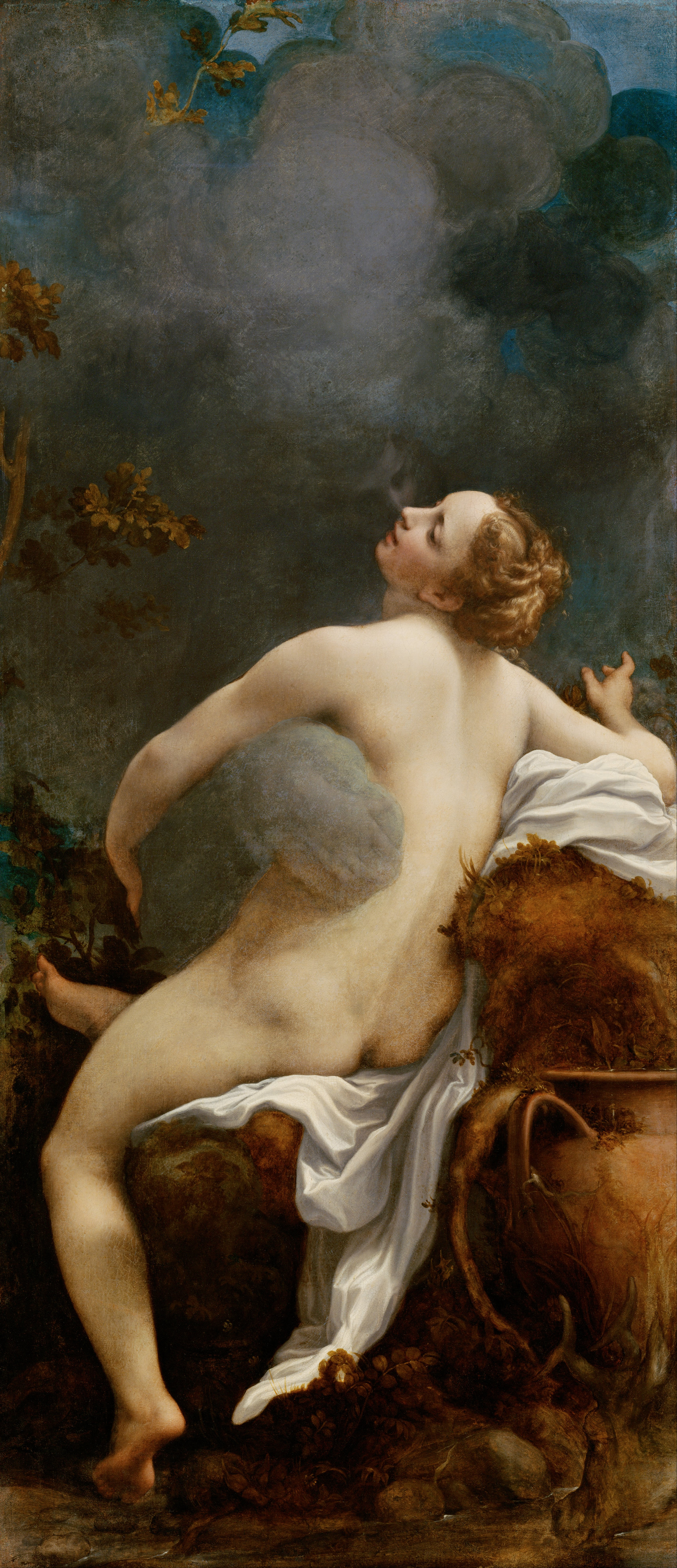
Jupiter and Io by Correggio, one of the few paintings to leave the Orleans Collection before the French Revolution. (Kunsthistorisches Museum, Vienna)

The Orleans Collection was a very important collection of over 500 paintings formed by Philippe II, Duke of Orléans, mostly acquired between about 1700 and his death in 1723. Apart from the great royal-become-national collections of Europe it is arguably the greatest private collection of Western art, especially Italian, ever assembled, and probably the most famous, helped by the fact that most of the collection has been accessible to the public since it was formed, whether in Paris, or subsequently in London, Edinburgh and elsewhere.

The core of the collection was formed by 123 paintings from the collection of Queen Christina of Sweden, which itself had a core assembled from the war booty of the sacks by Swedish troops of Munich in 1632 and Prague in 1648 during the Thirty Years War. During the French Revolution the collection was sold by Louis Philippe d'Orléans, Philippe Égalité, and most of it acquired by an aristocratic English consortium led by Francis Egerton, 3rd Duke of Bridgewater. Much of the collection has been dispersed, but significant groups remain intact, having passed by inheritance. One such group is the Sutherland Loan or Bridgewater Loan, including sixteen works from the Orleans Collection, in the National Gallery of Scotland, and another is at Castle Howard, Yorkshire. There are twenty-five paintings formerly in the collection now in the National Gallery, London, which have arrived there by a number of different routes.

The collection is of central interest for the history of collecting, and of public access to art. It figured in two of the periods when art collections were most subject to disruption and dispersal: the mid-17th century and the period after the French Revolution.

== Rudolf and Christina ==
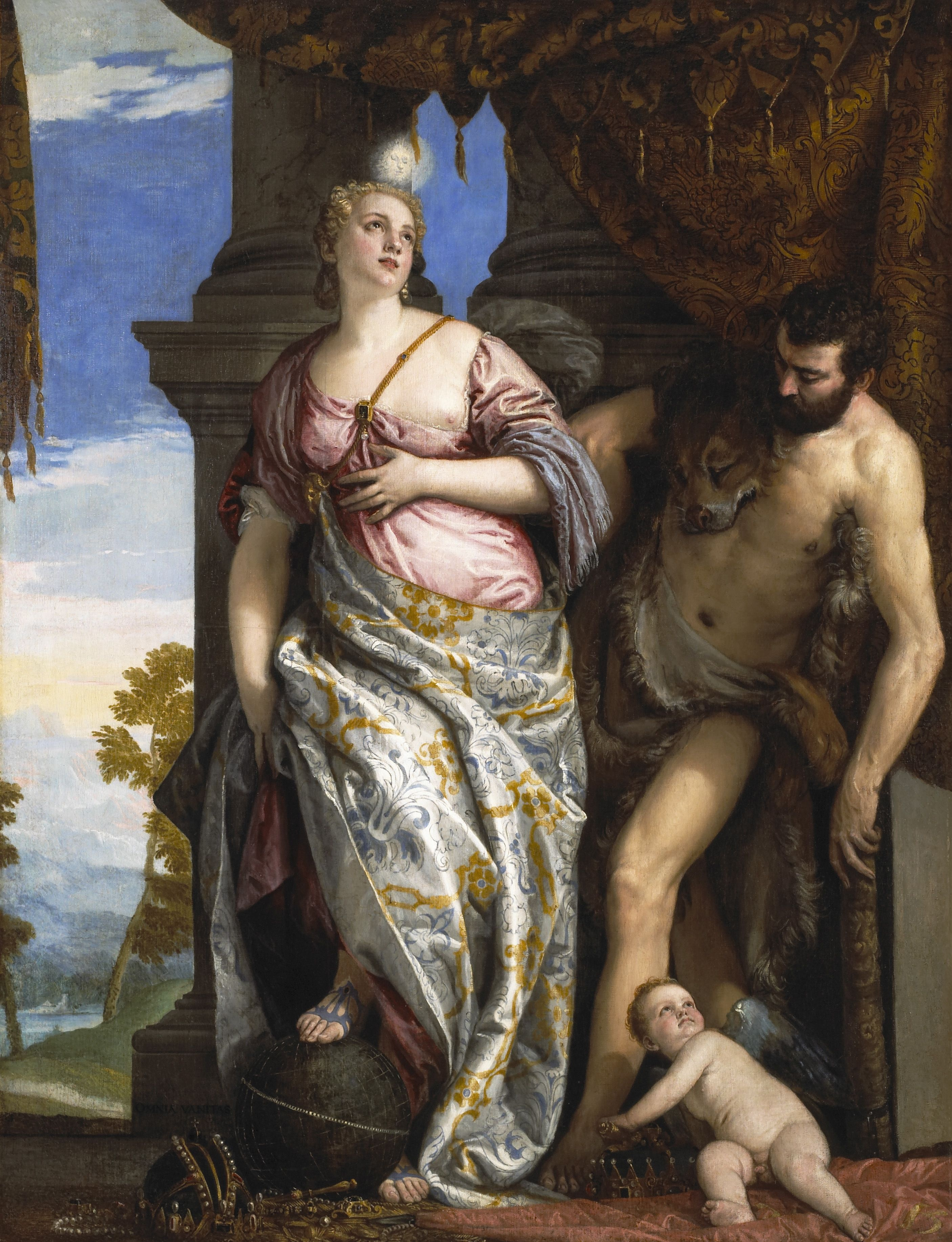
Allegory of Wisdom and Strength (c. 1580) by Veronese, originally painted for Rudolph II, Holy Roman Emperor, now in the Frick Collection, New York.

The paintings looted from Prague Castle had mostly been amassed by the obsessive collector Rudolph II, Holy Roman Emperor (1552–1612), whose own bulk purchases had included the famous collection of Emperor Charles V's leading minister Cardinal Granvelle (1517–86), which he had forced Granvelle's nephew and heir to sell to him. Granvelle had been the "greatest private collector of his time, the friend and patron of Titian and Leoni and many other artists", including his protégé Antonis Mor. The Swedes only skimmed the cream of the Habsburg collection, as the works now in Vienna, Madrid and Prague show.

Most of the booty remained in Sweden after Christina's departure for exile: she only took about 70 to 80 paintings with her, including about 25 portraits of her friends and family, and some 50 paintings, mostly Italian, from the Prague loot, as well as statues, jewels, 72 tapestries, and various other works of art. She was concerned that the royal collections would be claimed by her successor, and prudently sent them ahead to Antwerp in a ship before she abdicated.

Christina greatly expanded her collection during her exile in Rome, for example adding the five small Raphael predella panels from the Colonna Altarpiece, including the Agony in the Garden now reunited with the main panel in New York, which were bought from a convent near Rome. She was apparently given Titian's Death of Actaeon by the greatest collector of the age, Archduke Leopold William of Austria, Viceroy in Brussels - she received many such gifts from Catholic royalty after her conversion, and gave some generous gifts herself, notably Albrecht Dürer's panels of Adam and Eve to Philip IV of Spain (now in the Prado).

On her death she left her collection to Cardinal Decio Azzolino, who himself died within a year, leaving the collection to his nephew, who sold it to Don Livio Odescalchi, commander of the Papal army, at which point it contained 275 paintings, 140 of them Italian. The year after Odescalchi's death in 1713, his heirs began protracted negotiations with the great French connoisseur and collector Pierre Crozat, acting as intermediary for Philippe, duc d'Orléans. The sale was finally concluded and the paintings delivered in 1721. The French experts complained that Christina had cut down several paintings to fit her ceilings, and had over-restored some of the best works, especially the Correggios, implicating Carlo Maratta.

== Royal owners ==
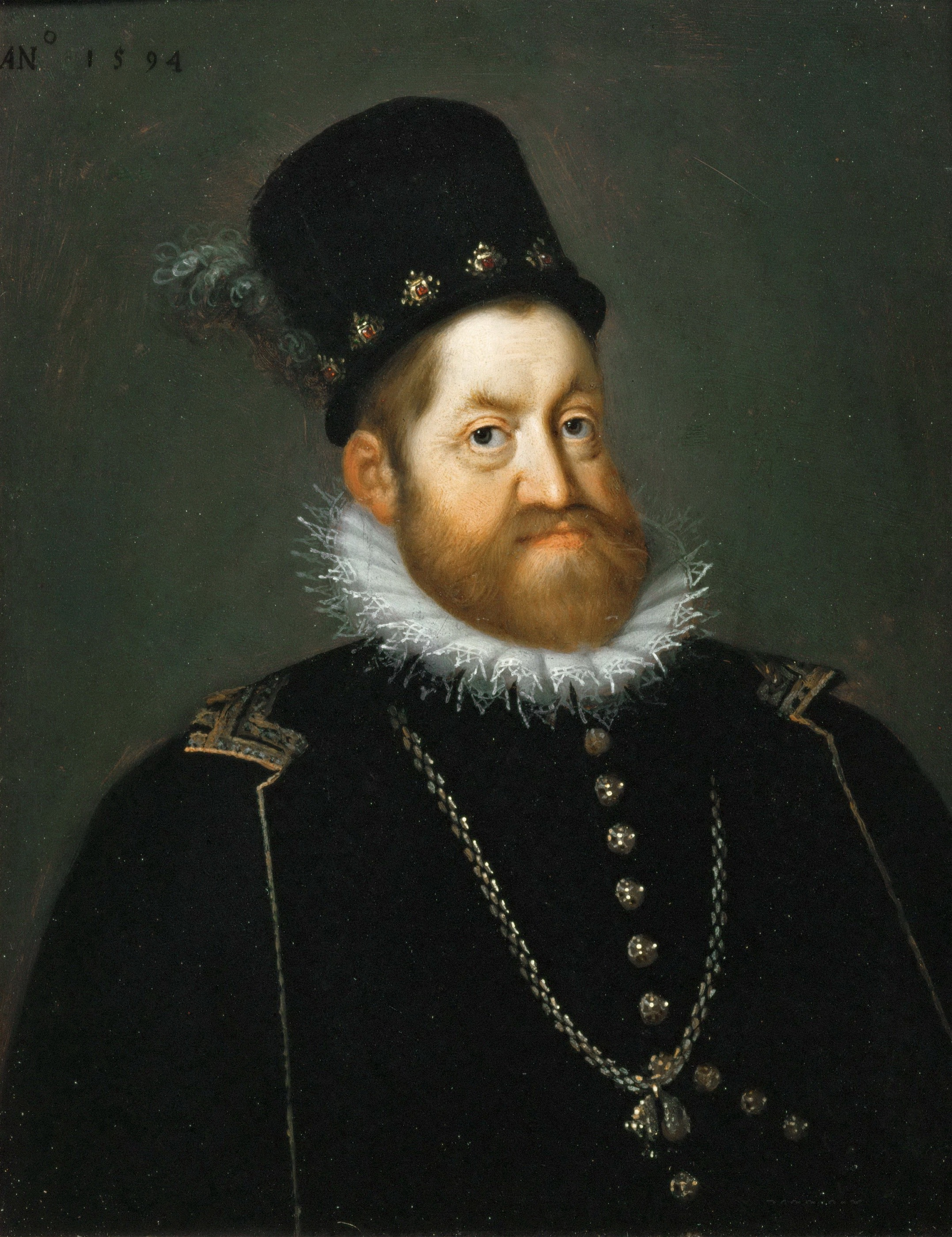
Rudolf II, Holy Roman Emperor, 1552–1612, deposed by his family after he turned into a recluse

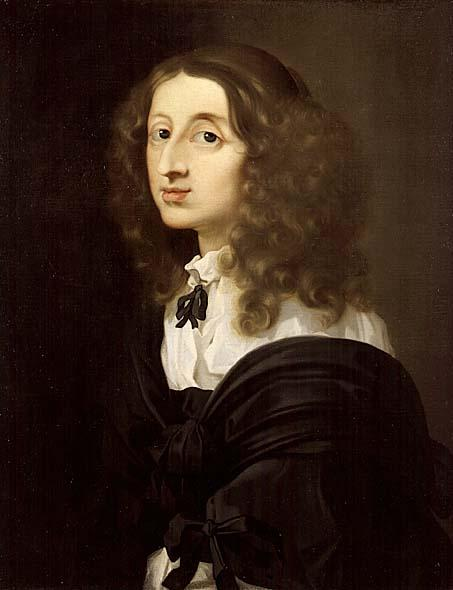
Christina of Sweden, 1626–1689, went into exile when she wanted to convert to Catholicism

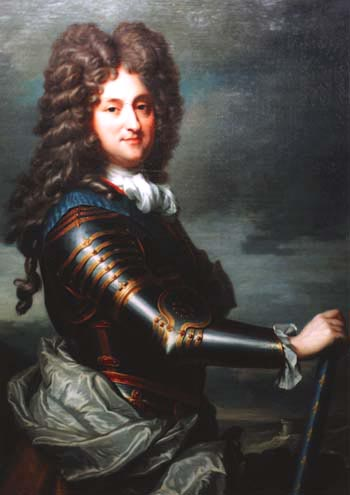
Philippe d'Orléans, 1674–1723, Regent of France, who assembled the Orleans Collection

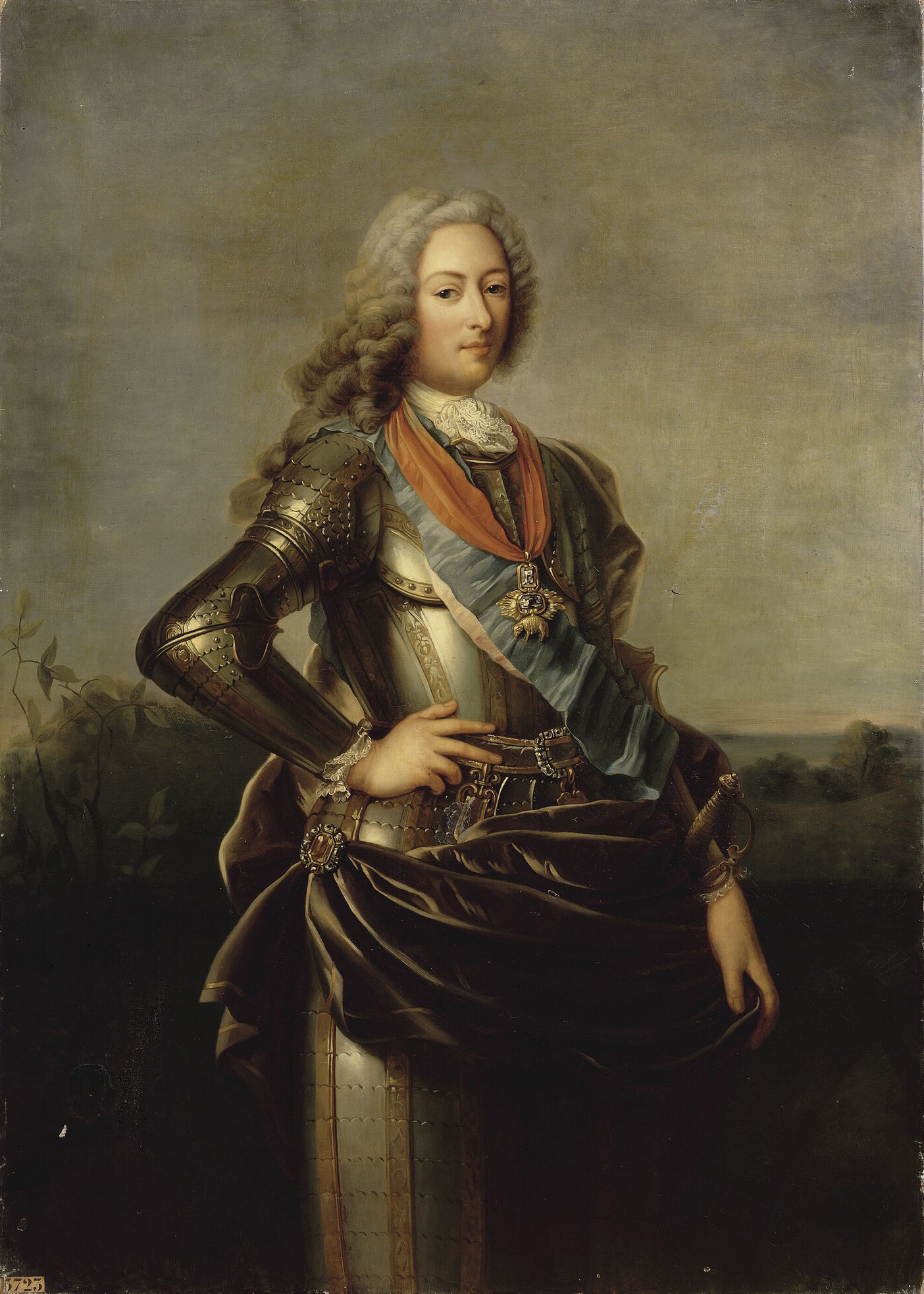
Louis, Duke of Orléans (1703–1752)

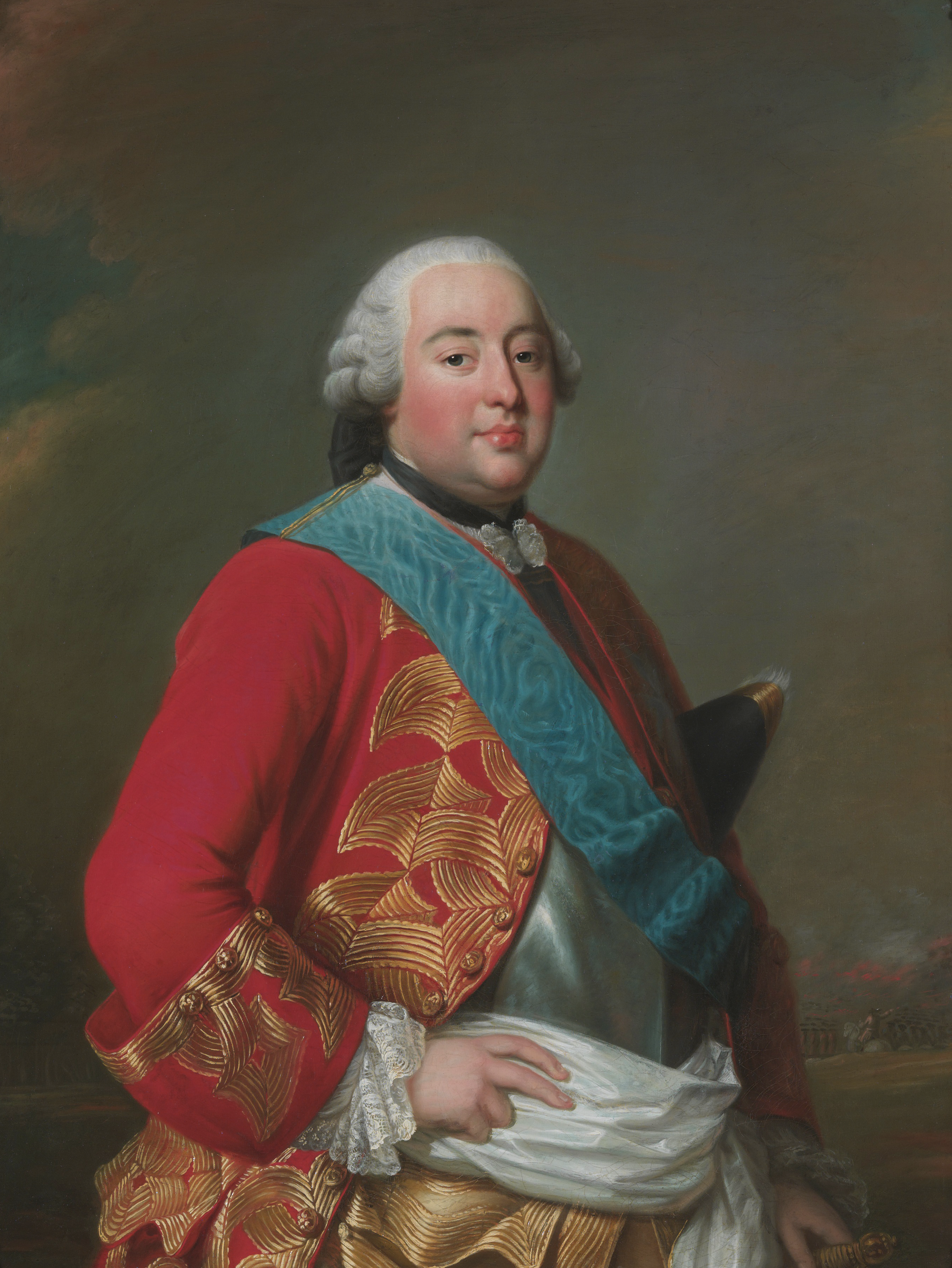
Louis Philippe I, Duke of Orléans

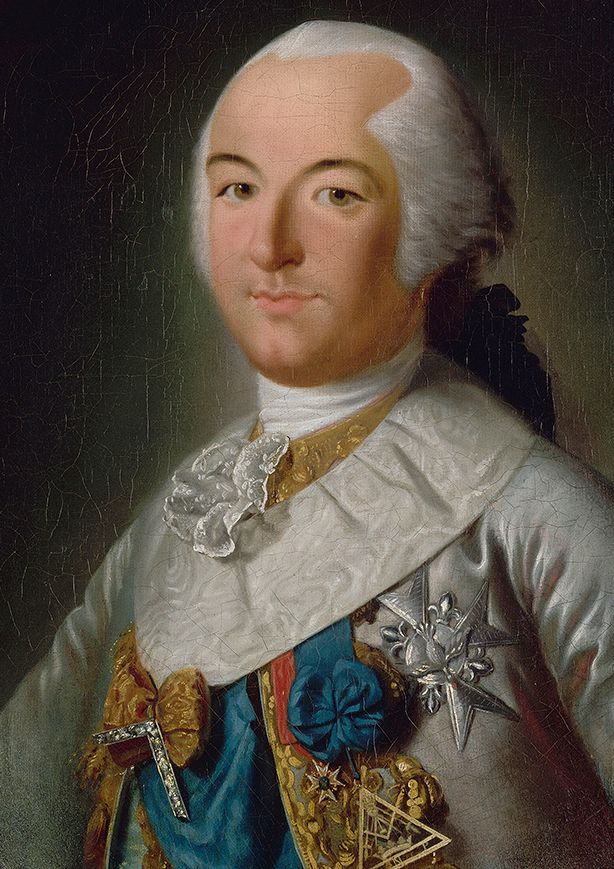
"Philippe Égalité", Louis Philippe II, Duke of Orléans, 1747–1793, guillotined in the Reign of Terror

== Collection in Paris ==
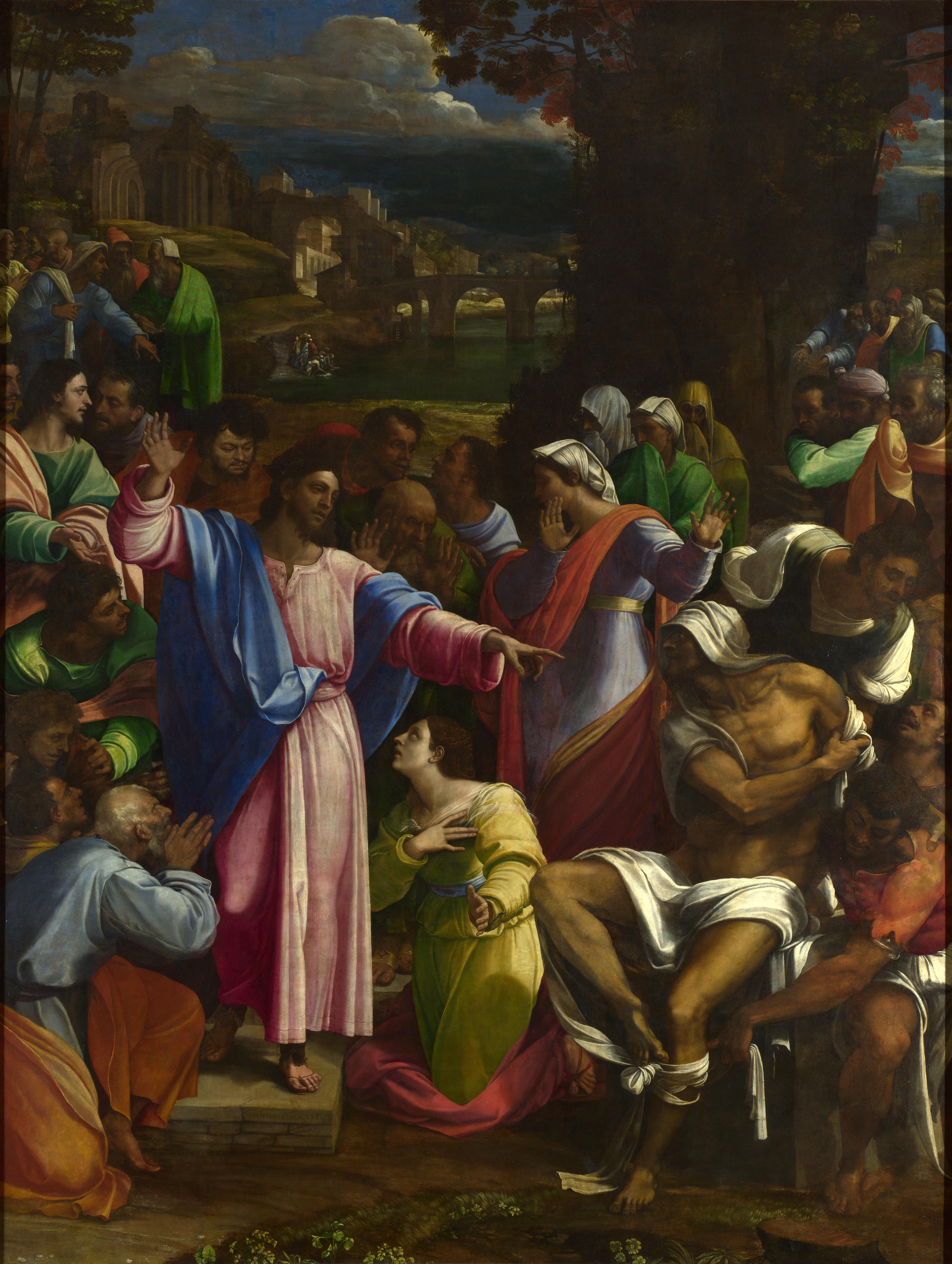
The Raising of Lazarus by Sebastiano del Piombo, extracted by Phillippe from Narbonne Cathedral and later "NG1", the first entry in the National Gallery catalogue

The Orleans collection was housed in the magnificent setting of the Palais-Royal, the Paris seat of the dukes of Orléans. Only 15 paintings in the printed catalogue of 1727 had been inherited by Philippe II from his father, Philippe de France, Duke of Orléans, Monsieur (1640–1701); the "collection" as catalogued was by no means all the art owned by the dukes, but recorded only that part kept together in the Palais-Royal for public viewing. He also inherited small but high quality collections from Henrietta Anne Stuart, his father's first wife, in 1701 and his father's lover, the Chevalier de Lorraine in 1702.

According to Reitlinger, his most active phase of collecting began in about 1715, the year he became Regent on the death of his uncle Louis XIV, after which he no doubt acquired an extra edge in negotiations. He also began to be presented with many paintings, most notably the three of Titian's poesies, now in Boston and shared by Edinburgh and London, which were given by Philip V of Spain to the French ambassador, the Duc de Gramont, who in turn presented them to the Regent.

Christina's collection only joined Philippe's shortly before the end of his life and most of the other works were bought in France, like the Sebastiano del Piombo Raising of Lazarus, with some from the Netherlands or Italy, like the Nicolas Poussin set of the Seven Sacraments, bought from a Dutch collection by Cardinal Guillaume Dubois in 1716. Other sources included the heirs of Cardinals Richelieu and Mazarin, and Cardinal Dubois, with an especially important group from Jean-Baptiste Colbert's heir the Marquis de Seignelay, and others from the dukes of Noailles, Gramont, Vendôme and other French collectors.

The paintings were housed in two suites of large rooms running side by side down the west or library wing of the palace, with the smaller Dutch and Flemish works in smaller rooms. The gallery suites of rooms still retained much of their original furniture, porcelain and wall-decorations from their use by Phillippe's father as grand reception rooms and according to a visitor in 1765 it was "impossible to imagine anything more richly furnished or decorated with more art and taste". Rearrangements had been made to accommodate the paintings; connoisseurs particularly praised the Galerie à la Lanterne, with its even, sunless top light diffused from the cupola overhead. For most of the 18th century it was easy to visit the collection, and very many people did so, helped by the printed catalogue of 1727, republished in 1737, Description des Tableaux du Palais Royal. This contained 495 paintings, though some continued to be added, and a few disposed of.

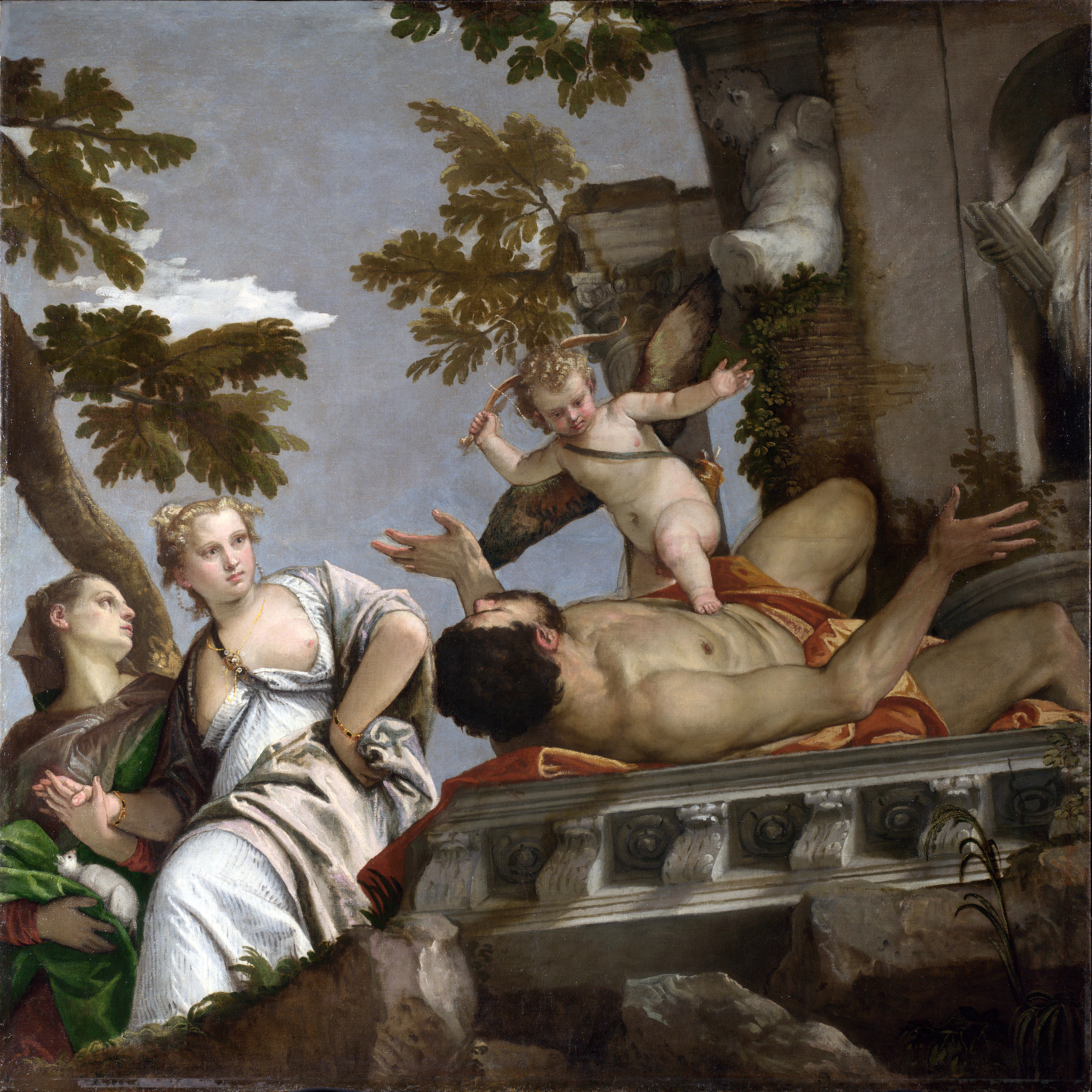
Paolo Veronese's Scorn, one of the four Allegories of Love, c. 1575. The series was first recorded in the collection of the Holy Roman Emperor in Prague in 1637, before passing via Sweden to the Orleans Collection. It was sold at auction in 1800 in London to John Bligh, 4th Earl of Darnley, whose heirs sold it to the National Gallery, London in 1890.

Paintings were hung, not by 'schools' or by subject but in order to maximise their effects in juxtaposition, in the 'mixed school' manner espoused by Pierre Crozat for his grand private collection in his Parisian hôtel. The mixture on a wall of erotic and religious subjects was disapproved of by some visitors. The collection was most notable for Italian paintings of the High and Late Renaissance, especially Venetian works. The collection included no fewer than five of the poesies painted for Philip II of Spain, of which two are now shared between Edinburgh and London, two always in London (Wallace Collection and National Gallery), and one in Boston. A series of four mythological allegories by Veronese are now divided between the Fitzwilliam Museum in Cambridge, and the Frick Collection (with two, one illustrated above) and Metropolitan Museum in New York. Another Veronese series, the four Allegories of Love now in the National Gallery, hung as overdoors in the central salon, which also held the larger Veronese series, three of the Titian poesies and Correggios.

The collection included (on the contemporary attributions) 28 Titians, most now regarded as workshop pieces but including several of his finest works, 12 Raphaels, 16 Guido Renis, 16 Veroneses, 12 Tintorettos, 25 paintings by Annibale Carracci and 7 by Lodovico Caracci, 3 major Correggios plus ten no longer accepted as by him, and 3 Caravaggios. Attributions no longer accepted, and probably regarded as dubious even then were 2 Michelangelos, and 3 Leonardos. There were few works from the 15th century, except for a Giovanni Bellini. The collection reflected the general contemporary confusion outside Spain as to what the works of the great Velázquez actually looked like; the works attributed to him were of high quality but by other artists such as Orazio Gentileschi.

Rembrandt, The Mill, 1645–48, one of his most famous landscapes, now in the National Gallery of Art, Washington.

French works, of which the catalogued collection included relatively few, included a set of the Seven Sacraments and 5 other works by Poussin. There were paintings by Philippe de Champaigne now in the Wallace Collection and Metropolitan Museum of Art, and a Eustache Le Sueur which turned up in 1997 over a door in the Naval & Military Club and is now in the National Gallery. The Flemish works were dominated by Rubens with 19 paintings, including a group of 12 studies now widely dispersed, van Dyck with 10 works and David Teniers with 9. The Dutch paintings included 6 Rembrandts, 7 works by Caspar Netscher (one now Wallace Collection) and 3 by Frans van Mieris (one now National Gallery) that were more highly regarded then than they are now. There were 3 Gerrit Dous and 4 Wouwermans.

Philippe's son Louis d'Orléans, religious and somewhat neurotic, attacked with a knife one of the most famous works, Correggio's Leda and the Swan, now in Berlin, and ordered the painter Charles-Antoine Coypel to cut up all three of the great Correggio mythological works in the presence of his chaplain, which Coypel did, but saving and repairing the pieces. The Leda went to Frederick the Great of Prussia, the Danäe to Venice, where it was stolen and eventually sold to the English consul at Livorno, and Jupiter and Io went to the Imperial collection in Vienna. Some of the Flemish paintings were sold at auction in Paris, June 1727.

Beginning in 1785, a series of 352 engravings of the paintings were published on a subscription basis, until the series was abandoned during the Terror, by which time the paintings themselves had been sold. It was finally published in book form in 1806. These prints have greatly reduced the uncertainty that accompanies the identity of works in most dispersed former collections. There had already been many prints of the collection; the Seven Sacraments were especially popular among the middle classes of Paris in the 1720s.

== Gonzagas and Charles I ==
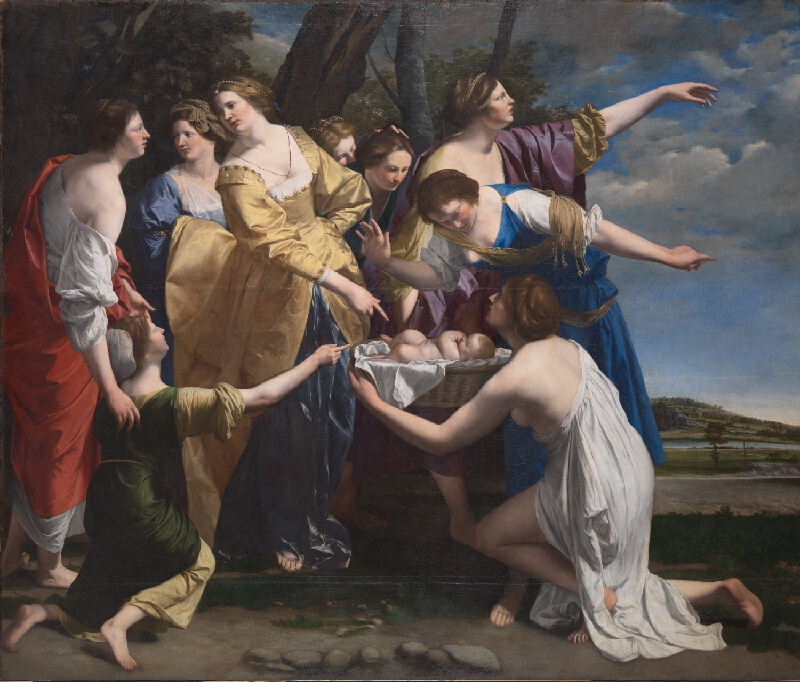
Finding of Moses by Orazio Gentileschi, painted for Charles I

Another famous collection whose history was entwined with the Orleans Collection was that assembled by the Gonzagas of Mantua, especially Francesco II (1466–1519) and his son Federico II (1500–1540). Their court artists included Mantegna and Giulio Romano, and they commissioned work directly from Titian, Raphael, Correggio and other artists, some of which were given as gifts to Charles V, Holy Roman Emperor, to whom Mantua was effectively a client state. The most important of these gifts were the mythological works by Correggio, later to be mutilated in Paris. By the early 17th century the dynasty was in terminal decline, and the bulk of their portable art collection was bought by the keen collector Charles I of England in 1625–27. Charles's other notable purchases included the Raphael Cartoons and volumes of drawings by Leonardo da Vinci, and his own most notable commissions were from Rubens and van Dyck. By the time his collection of paintings was seized and sold after his execution in 1649 by the English Commonwealth it was one of the finest outside Italy. Meanwhile, three years after the sale to Charles, Mantua was sacked by Imperial troops, who added much of what was left there to the Imperial collection in Prague, where they rejoined the diplomatic gifts of a century earlier.

Some Mantuan paintings therefore passed from Prague via Christina to the Orleans Collection, while more were bought by French collectors in the London "Sale of the Late King's Goods" in 1650, and later found their way to the Palais-Royal. For example, an Infancy of Jupiter by Giulio Romano, bought from Mantua, left Charles' collection for France, passed to the Orleans Collection and the London sales, and after a spell back in France returned to England and was later bought by the National Gallery in 1859.

Other paintings in the same series were recovered for the Royal Collection in 1660; Charles II was able to exert pressure on most English buyers of his father's collection, but those gone abroad were beyond his reach. One important Rubens of Charles', the Landscape with St George and the Dragon (of 1630 - St George has Charles's features, the rescued princess those of his Queen), which passed via the dukes of Richelieu to the Palais-Royal and London, had always been recognised for what it was, and was bought back for the Royal Collection by George IV in 1814.

Another picture commissioned by Charles, The Finding of Moses by Gentileschi, painted for the Queen's House, Greenwich, was returned to Charles' widow Henrietta Maria in France in 1660. By the time it entered the Orleans Collection a half-century later, it was regarded as by Velázquez. It then was one of the Castle Howard paintings, and was only correctly identified after the existence of Gentileschi's second version in the Prado became known in England. After a sale in 1995 it was on loan for nearly 20 years to the National Gallery until they bought it for £22 million in December 2019. Phillippe's father's first wife, Henrietta Anne Stuart, was Charles I's daughter, and her small but select collection had been mostly given to her by her brother Charles II from the reclaimed royal collection on her marriage in 1661. On her death forty years later this was left to Phillippe.

== Dispersal in London ==
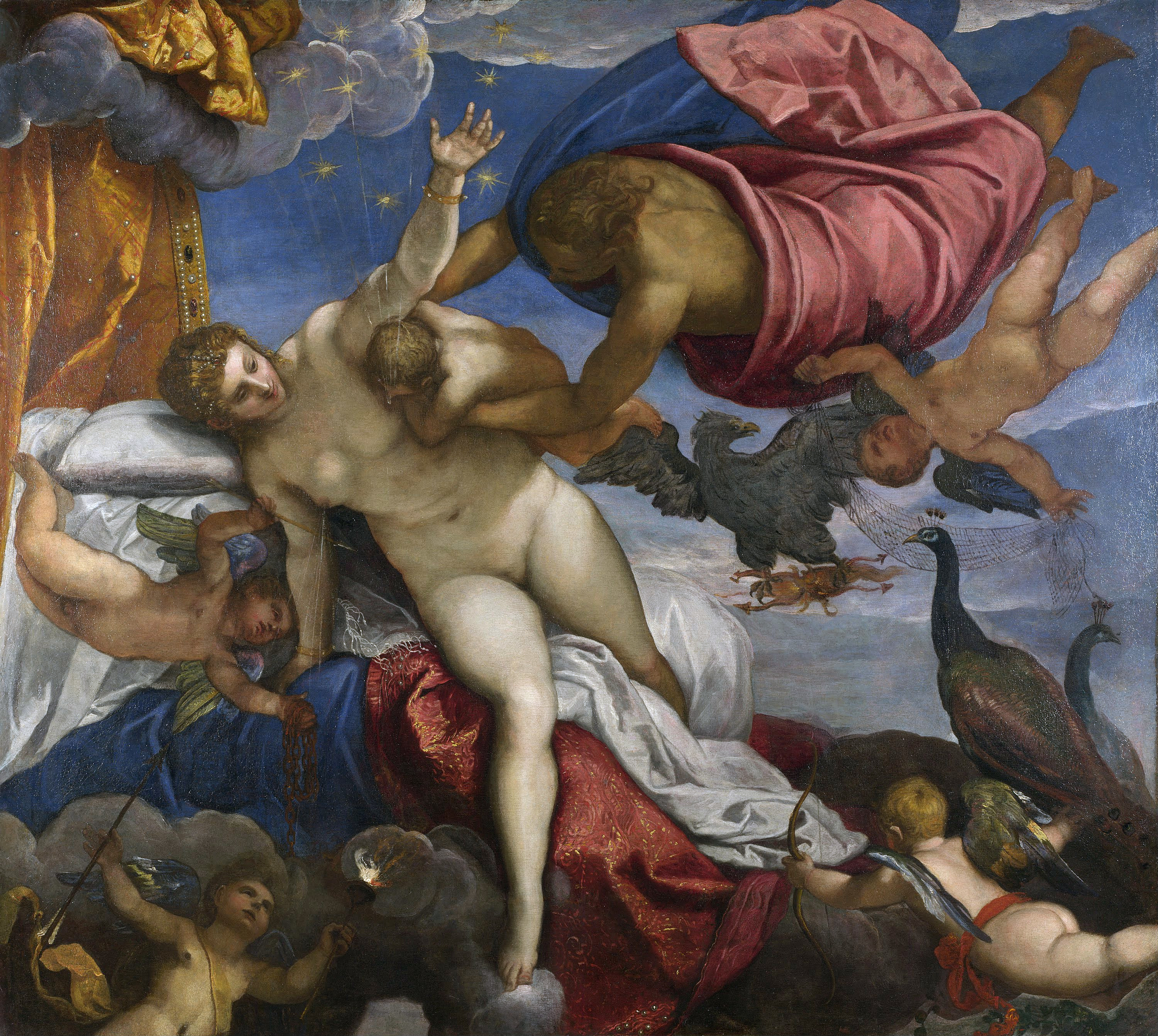
The Origin of the Milky Way by Tintoretto, bought for 50 guineas in 1800. This had belonged to Rudolf but not Christina, reaching the Orleans collection via the Marquis de Seignelay.

In 1787 Louis Philippe d'Orléans, the Regent's great-grandson, whose huge income could not keep pace with his gambling habit, had sold his equally famous collection of engraved gems to Catherine the Great of Russia, and in 1788 he was in serious negotiations with a syndicate organized by James Christie, founder of Christie's, the London auctioneer, for the sale of the paintings. Christie got as far as arranging that the collection should be made over to him upon the deposit of 100,000 guineas in the Bank of England, before the negotiations collapsed when the Prince of Wales having subscribed his name in the book for 7,000 guineas, and his brothers the dukes of York and Clarence for 5,000 each, no further subscribers were to be found. It was Dawson Turner's opinion that the failure was owing to the general sense that at the division of the spoils the lion's share would go to the royals.

In 1792 Philippe Égalité impulsively sold the collection en bloc to a banker of Brussels who immediately sold it at a huge profit to the enlightened connoisseur Jean-Joseph de Laborde de Méréville, who set about adding a gallery to house it attached to his hôtel in rue d'Artois. Ruined by events, he was forced to sell it once more.

The 147 German, Dutch and Flemish paintings were sold by Orléans to Thomas Moore Slade, a British dealer, in a syndicate with two London bankers and George Kinnaird, 7th Lord Kinnaird, for 350,000 livres in 1792, and taken to London for sale. There were protests from the French artists and public, and from the Duke's creditors, and Slade found it prudent to tell the French the pictures were going overland to Calais. In fact he had them moved onto a barge by night, and shipped them down the Seine to Le Havre. These paintings were exhibited for sale in the West End of London in April 1793 at 125 Pall Mall, where admissions at 1 shilling each reached two thousand a day, and sold to various buyers.

Philippe Égalité, as he had renamed himself, was arrested in April 1793 and was guillotined 6 November, but in the meantime sale negotiations for the Italian and French paintings were renewed, and they were sold for 750,000 livres to Édouard Walkiers, a banker of Brussels, who soon after sold them on, unpacked, to his cousin, Count François-Louis-Joseph de Laborde-Méréville, who had hoped to use them to add to the French national collection. After the start of the Reign of Terror, and the execution of his father as well as the Duke of Orléans, Laborde-Méréville saw he had to escape France, and brought the collection to London in early 1793.

The French and Italian paintings then spent five years in London with Laborde-Méréville, the subject of some complicated financial manoeuvres, including the failure of an attempt supported by King George III and the Prime Minister Pitt the Younger to buy them for the nation. They were finally bought in 1798 by a syndicate of the canal and coal-magnate Francis Egerton, 3rd Duke of Bridgewater, his nephew and heir, Earl Gower, later 1st Duke of Sutherland, and the Earl of Carlisle. Gower, who was perhaps the prime mover and must have known the collection well from his time as British ambassador in Paris, contributed 1/8 of the £43,500 price, Carlisle a quarter, and Bridgewater the remaining 5/8s.

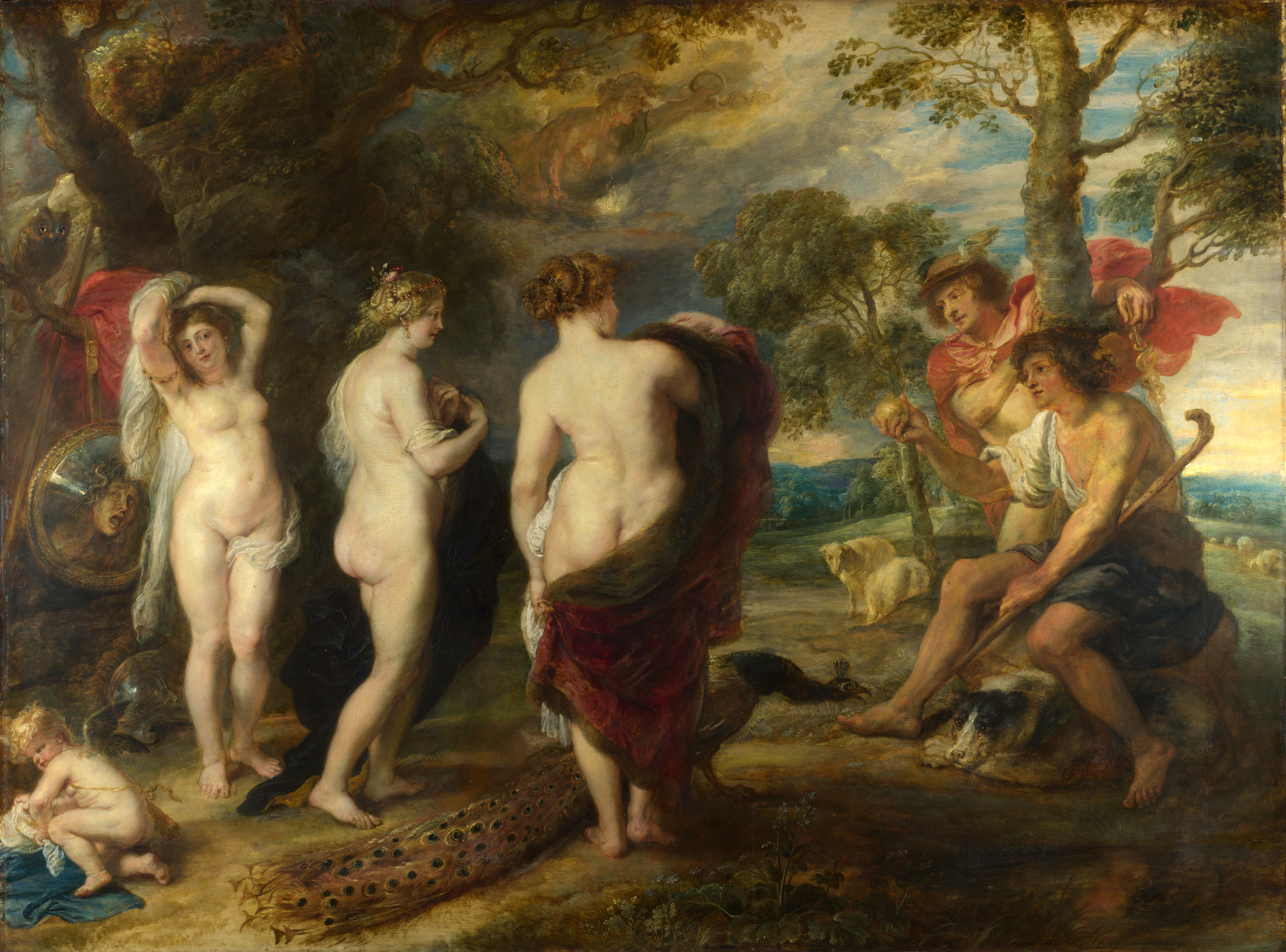
Rubens' The Judgement of Paris, bought by Philippe in France, one of the Northern portion.

The pictures were put on exhibition for seven months in 1798, with a view to selling at a least a part of them, in Bryan's Gallery in Pall Mall, with the larger ones at the Lyceum in the Strand; admission was 2/6d rather than the 1s. usual for such events. On first seeing the collection there, William Hazlitt wrote "I was staggered when I saw the works ... A new sense came upon me, a new heaven and a new Earth stood before me." In 1798, 1800 and 1802 there were auctions of those paintings not sold via the galleries, generally achieving rather low prices, but 94 out of 305 of the paintings were retained by the syndicate, as seems always to have been intended, and these largely remain in their families today. However these paintings represented over half of the valuations placed on the whole portion bought by the syndicate. Even at the often low prices realized, the sales to others, and entry receipts to the exhibitions, realized a total of £42,500, so even allowing for the expenses of the exhibitions and auctions, the syndicate got their works very cheaply. Castle Howard, home of the Earls of Carlisle, originally had fifteen works, now much reduced by sales, donations, and a fire, but the Bridgewater/Sutherland group remain intact to a large degree.

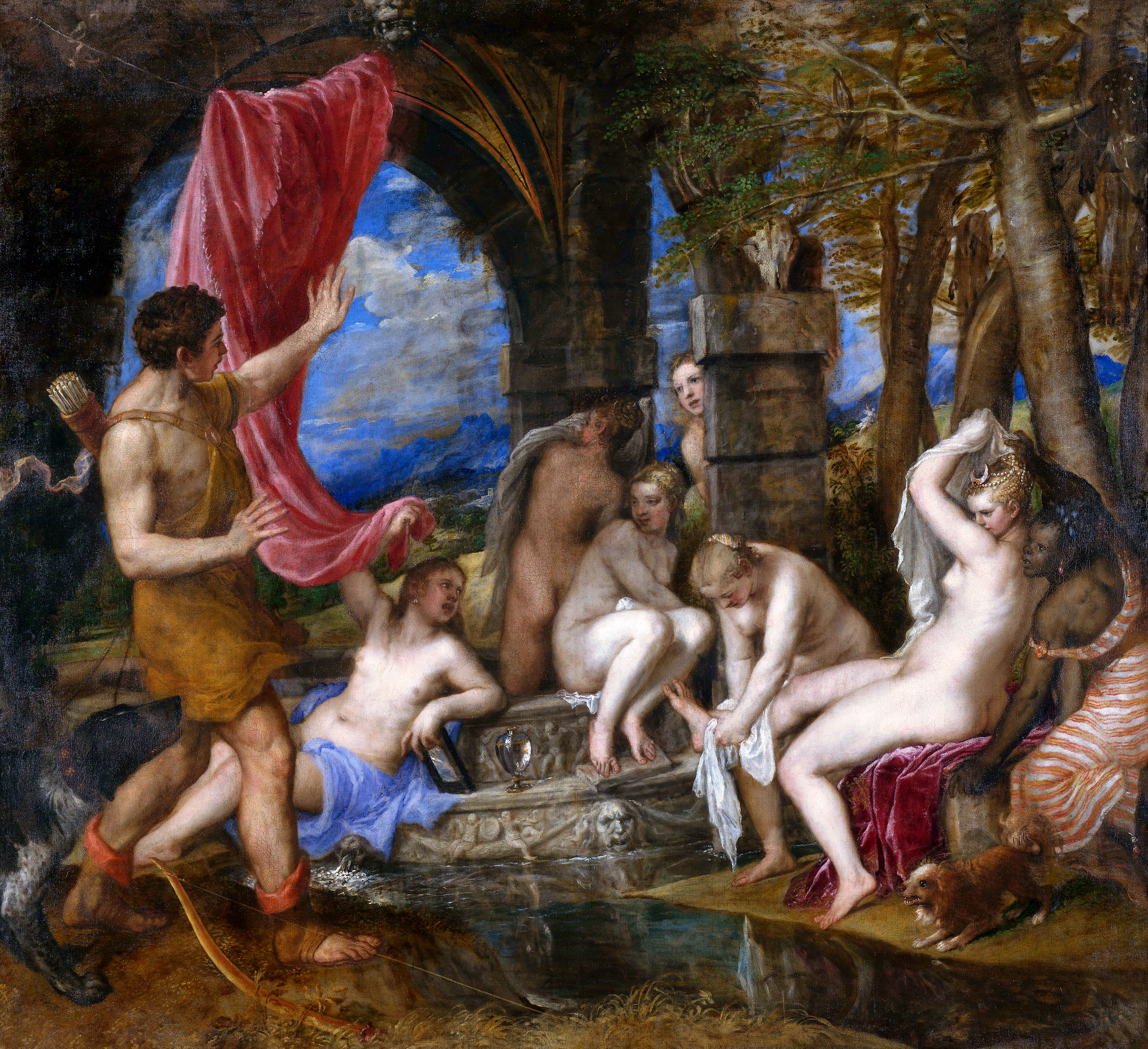
Diana and Actaeon by Titian, 1557–59, part of the Sutherland Loan until bought for the nation in 2009 (see below)

The London market in these years was flooded by both other collections from France itself, and those dislodged by the French invasions of the Low Countries and Italy—by 1802 including Rome itself. As is often the case with old collectors, their choices of what to keep and what to sell seem in many cases very strange today: the two "Michelangelos" were only sold in the auctions, and for only 90 and 52 guineas. Many Titians were sold, but many Bolognese Baroque works, as well as most of the later (but not the earlier) Raphaels, were retained. The single Watteau went for only 11 gn, while one Carracci was valued at £4,000 for the galley sale, where all 33 Carraccis were sold, while works attributed to Giovanni Bellini and Caravaggio remained at the auction stage. The current location of many of the pictures can no longer be traced, and many are now attributed to lesser artists or copyists. Overall the prices realized for the better pictures were high, and in some cases their level would not be reached again for a century or longer. As an extreme case, a Ludovico Carracci valued at 60gn in 1798 was auctioned by the 5th Duke of Sutherland in 1913 raising 2gn.

An example of a work now only known from a replica (in the Galleria Borghese in Rome) and studies is Aeneas and his Family Fleeing Troy, the only secular history painting by Federico Barocci. The prime version was given in 1586 by Francesco Maria II, the last Duke of Urbino, to Rudolph II in Prague, and was later looted by the Swedes. It was taken to Rome by Queen Christina, passed to the Orleans collection, and finally sold at auction in London for 14 guineas in 1800 (the price probably reflecting the poor condition some sources mention), since when its whereabouts are unknown. The Rome version was painted in 1598, presumably for Cardinal Scipio Borghese.

The paintings of both portions of the collection were bought by a wide range of wealthy collectors, the great majority English, as the wars with France made travelling to London difficult for others. Major buyers included Thomas Hope, a Dutch banker (distantly of Scottish extraction) sheltering in London from the Napoleonic Wars, who with his brother (of Hope Diamond fame) bought the two large Veronese allegories now in the Frick Collection, and works by "Michelangelo", "Velásquez" and Titian, John Julius Angerstein, a Russian-German banker whose collection later became the foundation of the National Gallery and John Bligh, 4th Earl of Darnley.

An analysis by Gerald Reitlinger of "most" of the buyers (of the Italian and French pictures) divides them as follows:

- Nobility - 12, including the syndicate
- Merchants - 10, including 4 Members of Parliament and 3 knights; mostly as speculators according to Reitlinger - their purchases were mostly resold within a few years
- Dealers - 6, including Bryan, who handled matters for the syndicate
- Bankers - Hope and Angerstein (both foreign)
- Painters - 4: Walton, Udney, Cosway and Skipp
- Gentleman Amateurs - 6, including William Beckford and the critic Samuel Rogers.

- a breakdown he describes as "quite unlike anything in Europe and grotesquely unlike pre-revolutionary France", where the main collectors were the tax farmers. Many of the same figures appear in the similar list of buyers of the Northern paintings.

Much of our information about the sales comes from the Memoirs of Painting, with a Chronological History of the Importation of Pictures of Great Masters into England by the Great Artists since the French Revolution, by William Buchanan, published in 1824, of which the first 200 pages of Volume I are devoted to the Orleans sales, listing the works and most prices and buyers. Buchanan was himself involved in the import of art from 1802 onwards, and had his information from the dealers involved. He presents his own "exertions", and those of others, in the area in a thoroughly patriotic light, by implication as a part of the great national struggle with the French. Nicholas Penny notes the "somewhat comic" disparity between Buchanan's "sonorous words" on the subject and the "coarse and mercenary business letters" he reprints—many by himself.

== Bridgewater collection ==
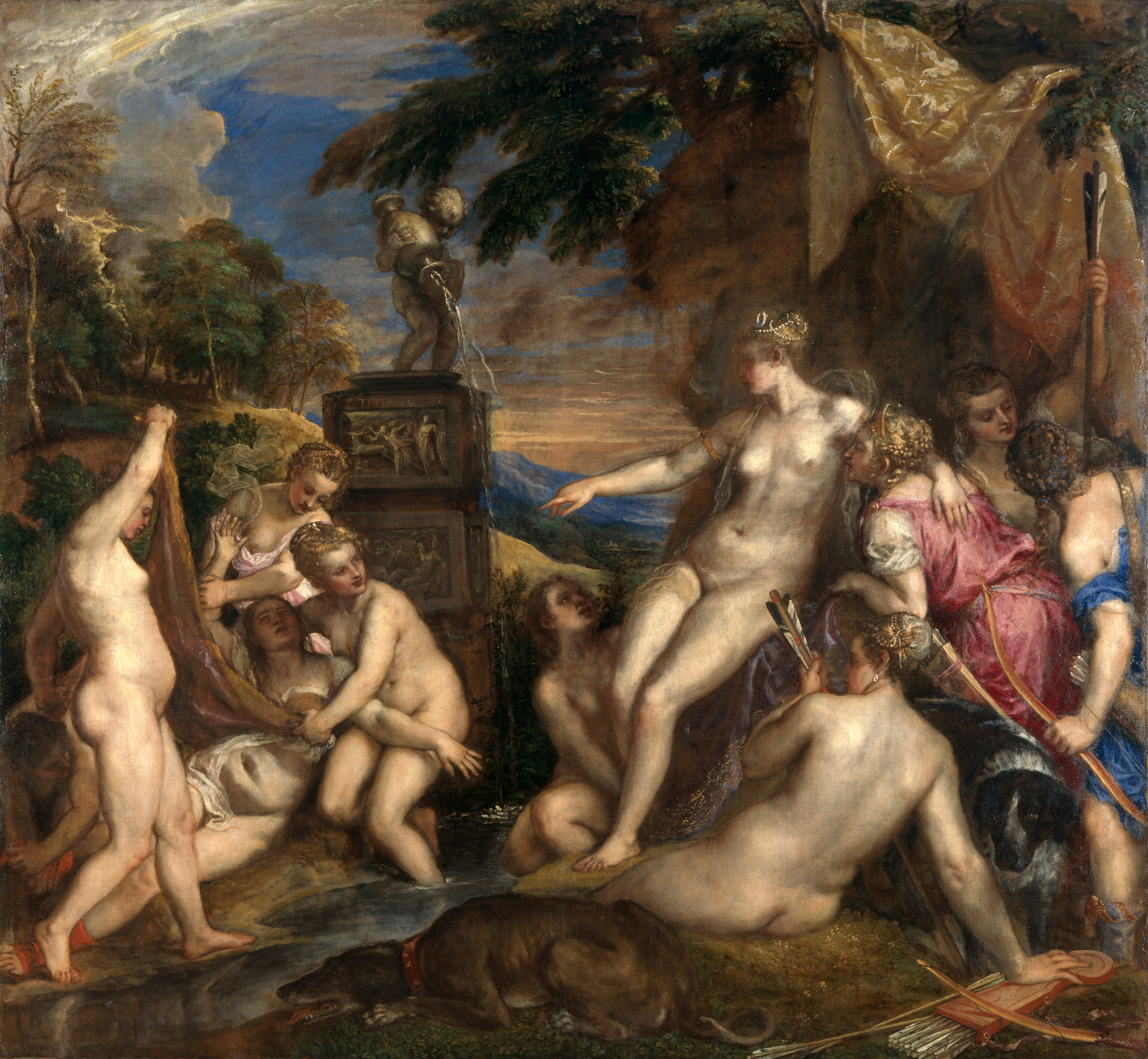
Titian's Diana and Callisto, long part of the Sutherland Loan to the National Gallery of Scotland, now sold and shared by them with the National Gallery.

On Bridgewater's death five years after the purchase, he bequeathed his collection to Gower, who put it and his own paintings on at least semi-public display in Bridgewater House, Westminster; it has been on public display ever since. The collection contained over 300 paintings, including about 50 Orleans paintings, and was known as the "Stafford Gallery" in Cleveland House until the house was rebuilt and renamed as Bridgewater House in 1854, and then as the "Bridgewater Gallery". It was opened in 1803, and could be visited on Wednesday afternoons over four, later three, months in the summer by "acquaintances" of a member of the family (in practice tickets could mostly be obtained by writing and asking for them), or artists recommended by a member of the Royal Academy. Angerstein's paintings were on display on similar terms in his house in Pall Mall, which from 1824 became the first home of the National Gallery.

On the outbreak of the Second World War in September 1939, the collection was moved from London to Scotland. Since 1946 26 paintings, sixteen from the Orleans Collection, known collectively as "the Bridgewater loan" or "the Sutherland Loan" have been on loan to the National Gallery of Scotland in Edinburgh, though up to 2008 five from this group had been bought by the Gallery.

The collection has passed by descent to Francis Egerton, 7th Duke of Sutherland, (most of whose wealth is contained in the paintings collection), but in late August 2008 the 7th Duke announced that he wished to sell some of the collection in order to diversify his assets. He at first offered Diana and Callisto and Diana and Acteon, two works by Titian as a pair to the British national galleries at £100 m (a third of their overall estimated market price) over a period. The National Gallery of Scotland and the National Gallery in London announced they would combine forces to raise the sum, initially in the form of £50 m to purchase Diana and Actaeon paid over three years in instalments and then £50 m for Diana and Callisto paid for similarly from 2013. The campaign gained press support, though it received some criticism for the Duke's motives or (from John Tusa and Nigel Carrington of the University of the Arts) for distracting from funding art students In 2009 it was announced that the first £50M for Diana and Actaeon had been raised - the painting will rotate every five years between Edinburgh (first) and London. The sale of Diana and Callisto for £45M was announced in 2012.

== Paintings with articles once in the collection ==
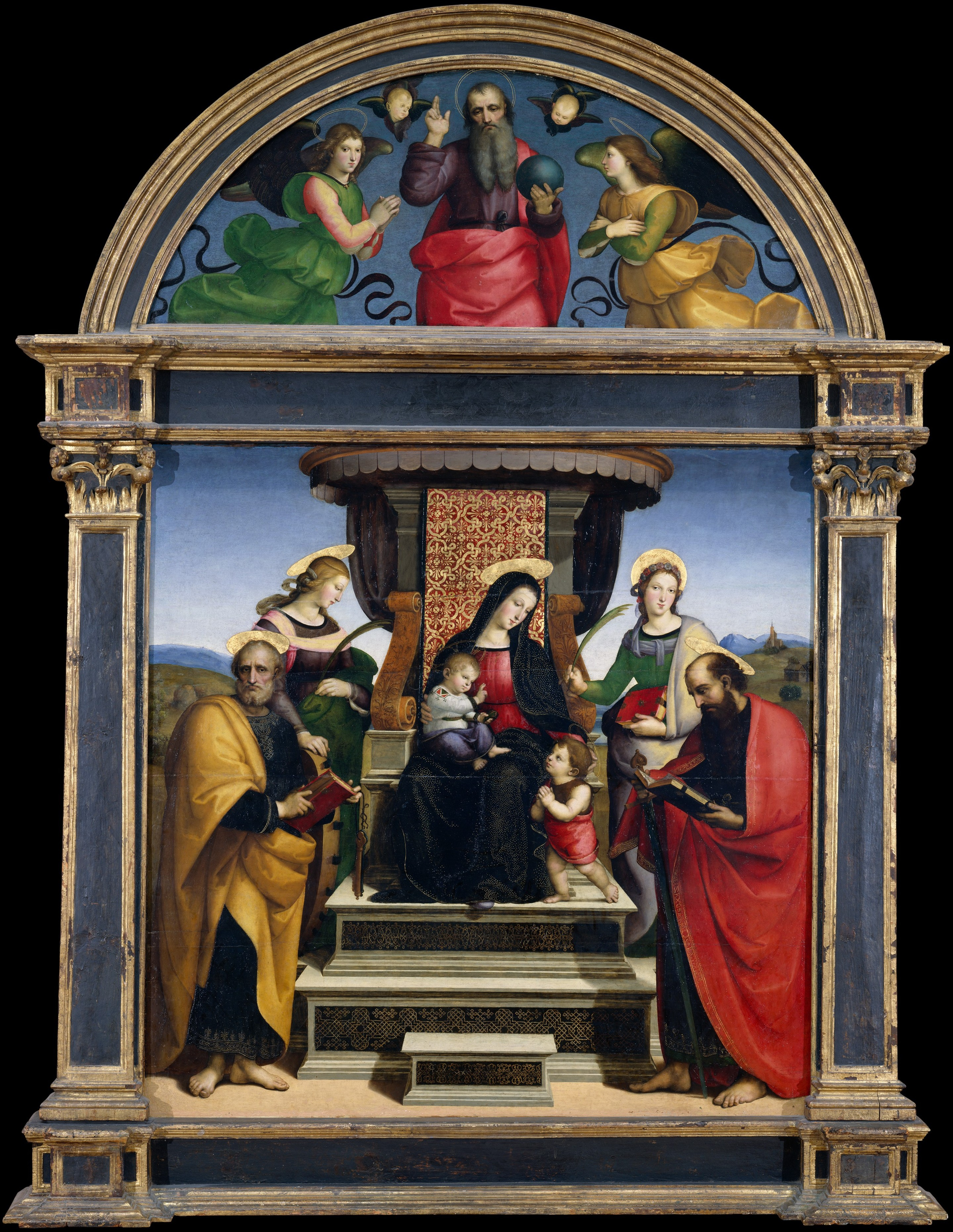
Raphael, Colonna Altarpiece, c. 1504, Metropolitan Museum of Art

=== Titian ===
==== Poesie for Philip II ====
- Venus and Adonis, two versions, but not Philip's
- Perseus and Andromeda
- Diana and Callisto
- Diana and Actaeon
- The Rape of Europa
- The Death of Actaeon

==== Other ====
- The Three Ages of Man
- Venus Anadyomene
- Venus and Cupid with a Lute-player (now Fitzwilliam Museum)

=== Other artists ===
- Colonna Altarpiece by Raphael
- The Raising of Lazarus by Sebastiano del Piombo
- Jupiter and Io and Danaë by Correggio
- Origin of the Milky Way by Tintoretto
- The Mill by Rembrandt
- Allegory of Virtue and Vice Allegory of Wisdom and Strength and Venus and Mars by Paolo Veronese
- Orléans Madonna by Raphael

== Current locations ==
- National Gallery, London - at least 25 works, plus two currently on loan there.
- National Gallery of Scotland - sixteen works, including those on loan.
- Wallace Collection, London - 6 works
- Metropolitan Museum of Art, New York - At least three works, the Raphael Colonna Altarpiece and a predella panel, a Philippe de Champaigne, and a Veronese
- National Gallery of Art, Washington - four works by: Rembrandt, Ludovico Carracci, Sébastien Bourdon and ?Jan Cossiers (as well as two important works from other sources once in the collection of Earl Gower).
- Frick Collection, New York - two Veroneses (see above), two portraits of Frans Snyders and his wife by van Dyck

Other works are in: Berlin, Vienna, Dresden, Malibu, Paris, Rome, Boston (Titian The Rape of Europa), Tokyo, Kansas City, and many other cities.
