= Orléans Madonna =

Painting by Raphael

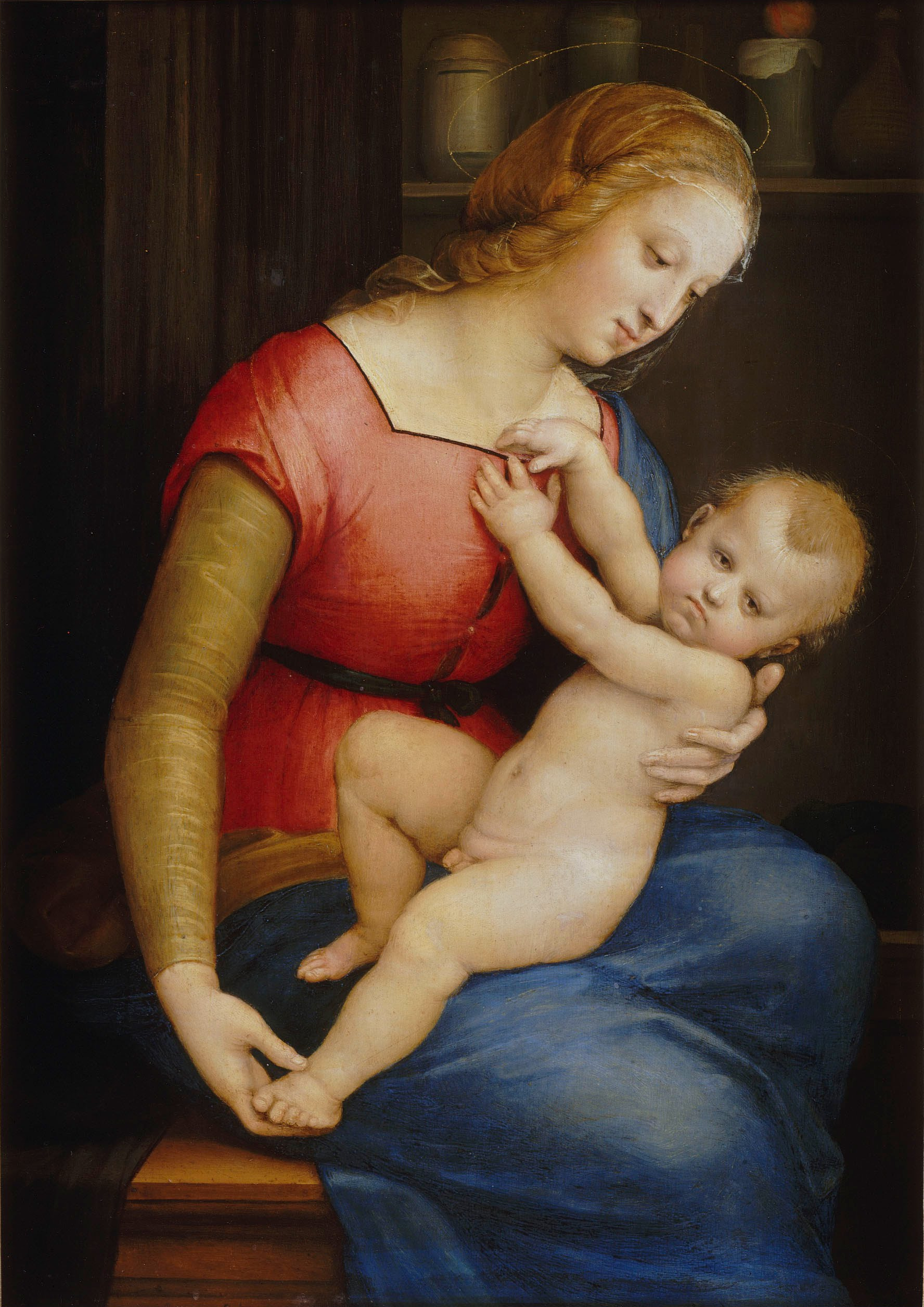
- Artist: Raphael
- Year: 1506
- Type: oil on panel
- Dimensions: 31 cm × 23 cm (12 in × 9.1 in)
- Location: Musée Condé, Chantilly

The Orléans Madonna is a c.1506-1507 painting of the Madonna and Child by Raphael. It was acquired by Philippe II, Duke of Orléans for the Orléans collection, giving it its present name. It is now in the Musée Condé in Chantilly.

== History ==
Copies of the work are mentioned in Piedmont in the early 16th century and the Piedmont-born painter Giovanni Martino Spanzotti mentioned it as a "tabuleto fiorentino" in a 1507 letter to Charles II of Savoy. Several other studio copies of the painting were made between 1507 and 1526, four of which are still known to survive, including one at the Rijksmuseum in Amsterdam and one in the Walters Art Museum in Baltimore, USA.

The original work remained in the collection of the Dukes of Savoy until the 17th century. Christine of France bought four Raphael paintings in 1647, probably including this one. The work then vanishes until 1729, when it is mentioned in the Recueil d'estampes commissioned by Pierre Crozat as belonging to a man called Passart then passing to abbé François de Camps (1643-1723), scholar and bishop of Pamiers, and finally to Philippe d'Orléans (1674-1723). It was then kept in the Palais-Royal until the French Revolution.

In 1791 Philippe Égalité sold his whole collection of Italian paintings to his banker Édouard de Walckiers to cover his colossal debts. De Walckiers resold the collection to his cousin François Laborde de Méreville. In 1798, the whole collection was sold in London to a syndicate led by Francis Egerton, 3rd Duke of Bridgewater, George Leveson-Gower, Baron Gower and Frederick Howard, 5th Earl of Carlisle, though they then resold the Madonna, which was then acquired by the collectors George Hibbert in London in 1799, Christian Nieuwenhuys in 1831 in Brussels and Delamarre or de Lahaute in Paris. Next it was acquired by Alejandro María Aguado, 1st Marquess of Marismas del Guadalquivir in 1835 and finally by the businessman and parliamentarian François Delessert (1780-1868). Delessert's collection was sold a year after his death and the Madonna was acquired by Henri d'Orleans, Duke of Aumale, who hung it in the 'Santuario' of his château de Chantilly, alongside Three Graces and a panel by Filippino Lippi.

== See also ==
- List of paintings by Raphael
- fr:La Madone d'Orléans
