= The Raising of Lazarus (Sebastiano del Piombo) =

Painting by Sebastiano del Piombo

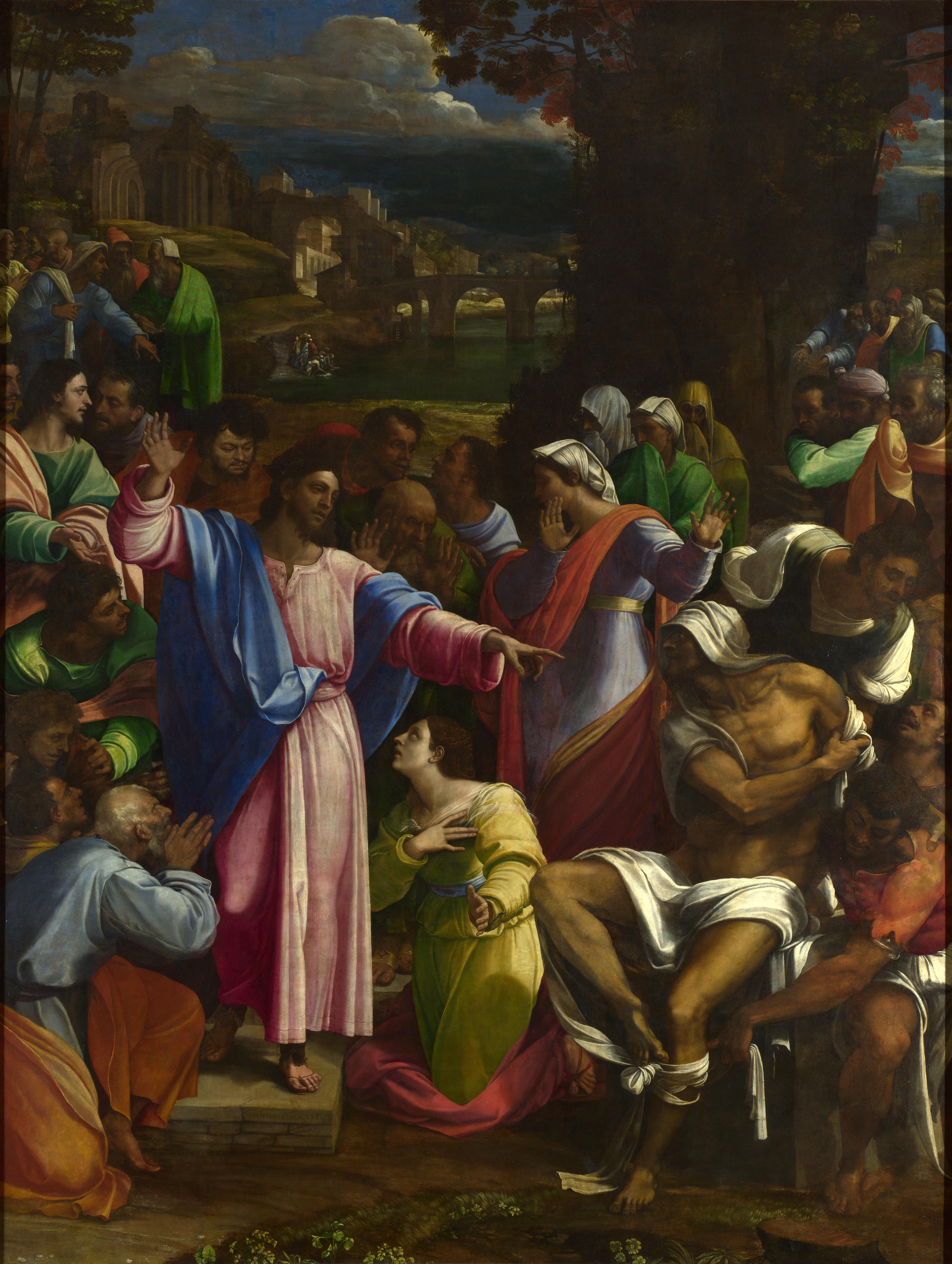
- Artist: Sebastiano del Piombo
- Year: 1517–1519
- Medium: Oil on wood, transferred to canvas
- Dimensions: 381 cm × 299 cm (150 in × 118 in)
- Location: National Gallery, London

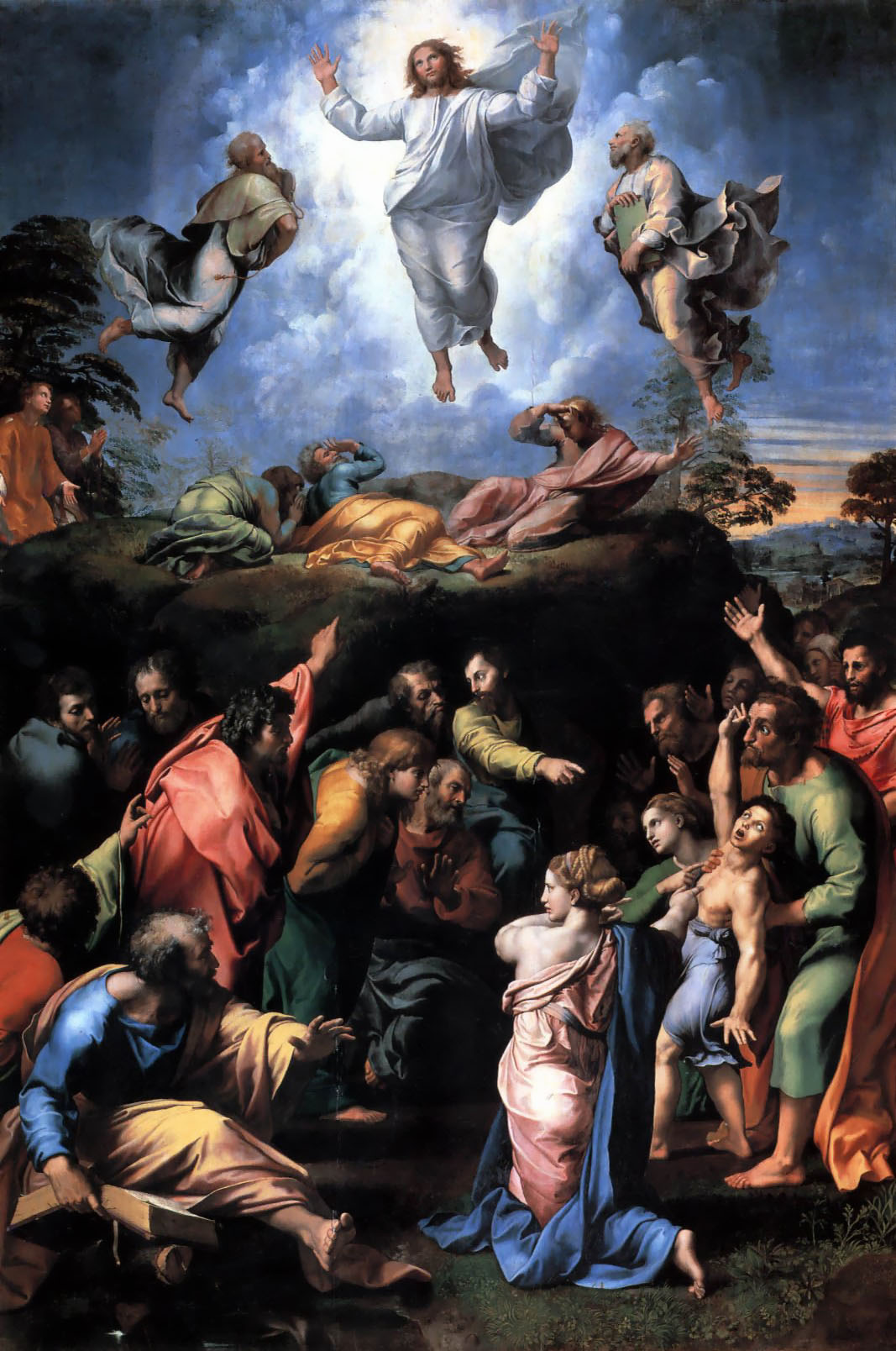
Raphael's Transfiguration, Vatican Pinacoteca

The Raising of Lazarus is a large altarpiece of 1517–1519 by the Italian High Renaissance artist Sebastiano del Piombo, for which Michelangelo supplied drawings for some figures. Intended for Narbonne Cathedral in France, it is now normally in Room 18 of the National Gallery in London, where it is "NG1", the first painting catalogued at the founding of the gallery in 1824.

It was commissioned by Cardinal Giulio de' Medici, then Archbishop of Narbonne and later Pope Clement VII (r. 1523–24), in what was effectively a contest engineered by Michelangelo, using Sebastiano as "a kind of deputy", or "cat's paw", in a rivalry between the two and Raphael, whose Transfiguration (now in the Vatican Pinacoteca) is the same size of 381 cm × 299 cm (150 in × 118 in) and was commissioned for the same cathedral. The verdict of Roman critical opinion was that Raphael's painting won.

According to Michael Levey, the painting is "a tour de force of massed, gesticulating bodies and glittering colour ... Perhaps all the elements have not been quite successfully fused, but the grand manner of the composition is impressive, and in its conscious rhetoric the painting looks forward to the Baroque."

Sebastiano, who had arrived in Rome from Venice in 1511, may have intended to dazzle the Roman critics with the colouring for which the Venetian School was famous, giving "the greatest and most subtly varied range of colours ever seen in a single painting". However, the complicated restoration history of the painting, and aspects of Sebastiano's technique combined with effects of age, have led to a general darkening of the painting, and significant changes in some of the large number of colour shades.

== Subject and description ==
Lazarus's resurrection from the dead was the most frequently depicted of the miracles of Jesus in medieval and Renaissance art, as both the most remarkable and the easiest to recognize visually, because of the grave-cloths. As well as following the Transfiguration in traditional sequences of the Life of Christ in art, the subject was especially appropriate for the cathedral at Narbonne, which had relics of Lazarus. The Medici family, whose name means "doctors" in Italian, were often attracted to subjects showing Christ as a healer (or medicus).

The account in Chapter 11 of the Gospel of John of the Raising of Lazarus from the dead is followed closely, though different moments in it are combined in the picture. For Sebastiano and his contemporaries, Mary the sister of Lazarus of Bethany was the same person as Mary Magdalene, though today even the Catholic Church agrees with Protestants that Mary of Bethany was a separate person. She is the figure kneeling in front of Christ, which in the gospels precedes the resurrection.

The main moment shown is just after John 11:45 when : "Jesus said to them, "Take off the grave clothes and let him go". But in the upper left background a group of Jews and Pharisees are depicted discussing the event, which completes the story in the gospels. The standing female in orange is Martha of Bethany, sister of Lazarus and Mary; in the gospel, before the tomb is opened, she protests that the body will smell, and her gesture suggests she was right.

The Twelve Apostles are crowded to the left of Christ and behind him. The younger man standing at the left, seen in profile, is Saint John the Evangelist, and the bearded kneeling man at lower left is Saint Peter, given an orange overgarment, as often in art. The others are probably not intended to be individually identifiable. By this stage of the High Renaissance, not even Christ is given a halo, making it harder to pick out any specific individuals from the crowd that the gospel account mentions. Michael Levey said the painting was "full of obvious portrait heads", but there has been much much less speculation as to the individuals with inserted likenesses than for Raphael's The School of Athens of a few years earlier.

The painting is signed in Latin "SEBASTIANVS. VENETVS. FACIE|BAT" ("Sebastian the Venetian made this") on the stone platform below Christ. Born Sebastiano Luciani, after coming to Rome he had become "Sebastiano Veneziano", until in 1531 he became the Keeper of the Seal to the Papacy, and so got the nickname del Piombo thereafter, meaning "of the lead", from his new job title.

== Style ==
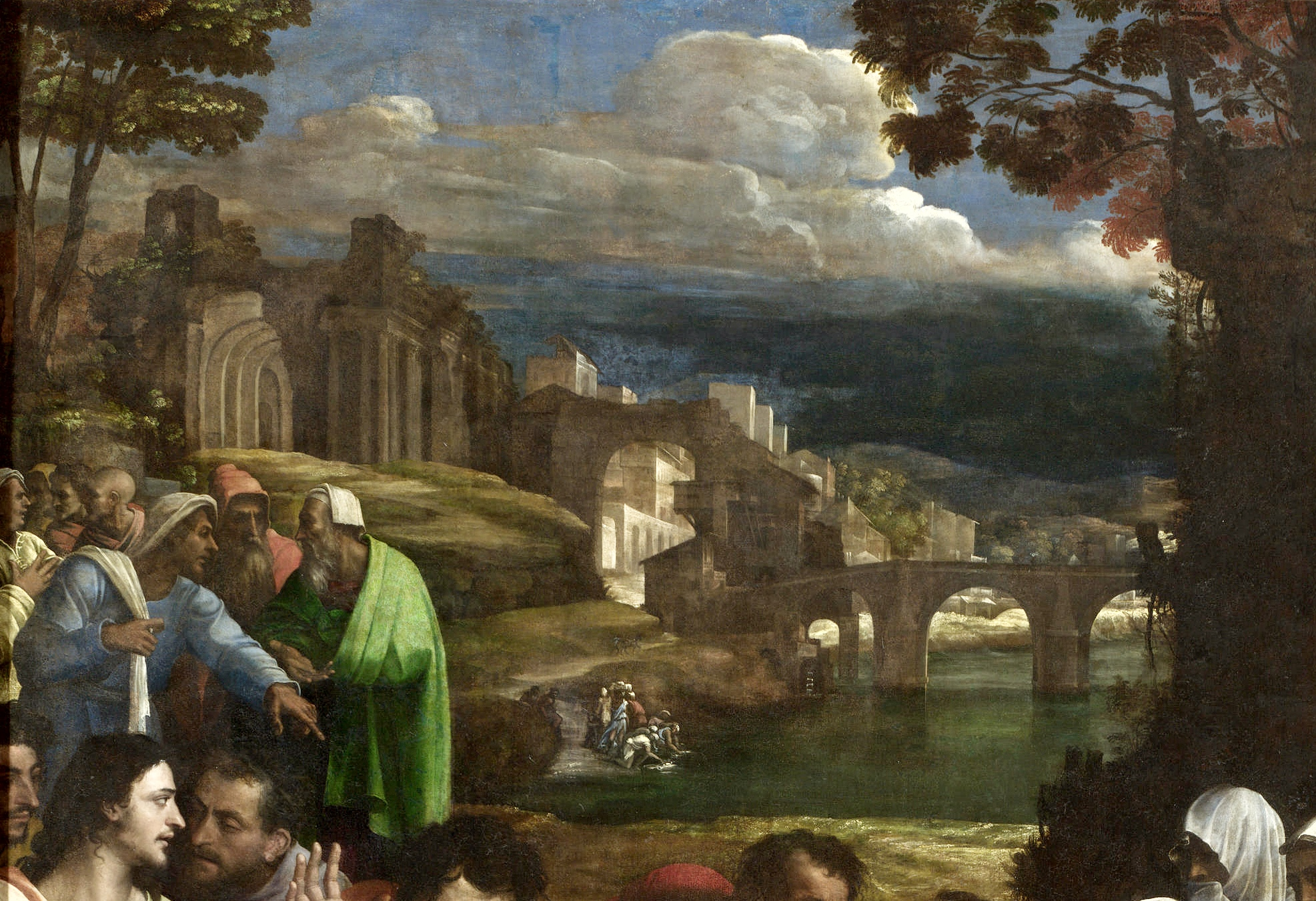
The landscape

The painting was begun some five years after Sebastiano had moved from his native Venice to Rome, and shows that his adaption to a monumental and classical Roman style was effectively complete, though the colours "retain a Venice-like luminosity that enchants the eye". Despite being conceived as a move against Raphael, with the help of Michelangelo, in its general composition it shows a good deal of influence from Raphael, and although the two paintings for Narbonne have only ever been seen together for a few days in 1520, and were both painted in conditions of great secrecy by the rival artists, in many ways they are a well-matched pair, showing how much Sebastiano had absorbed from Raphael.

The help received from Michelangelo was limited to the main male figures (see below), and the crowd and landscape background was Sebastiano's composition. The landscape has ruins and a bridge that look like a Roman setting, but the cloudy sky and other aspects suggest a Venetian landscape.

== History ==
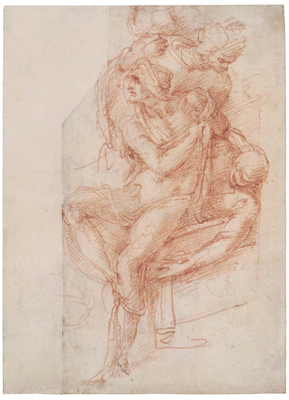
Drawing of Lazarus and attendants by Michelangelo, which Sebastiano used for the painting, British Museum.

=== In Rome ===
In 1516 Cardinal Giulio de' Medici, then Archbishop of Narbonne and later Pope Clement VII (r. 1523–24), commissioned a Raising of Lazarus from Sebastiano in competition with Raphael's late masterpiece the Transfiguration, commissioned earlier that year. The original declared intention was for both paintings to go to Narbonne Cathedral, which it is unlikely the cardinal ever visited. It seems likely that the idea for what inevitably became a contest was suggested by Michelangelo, who the previous year had enlisted Sebastiano "as a kind of deputy for him in painting", with the specific intention of contesting Raphael's primacy in painting in Rome, Michelangelo himself having returned to his backlog of promised projects in sculpture. In addition to being a friend of Sebastiano, he was eager to show up his bitter rival Raphael. The cardinal fell in with this idea.

Vasari, who knew both artists in later years, described the collaboration by saying that the picture was made "sotto ordine e disegno in alcune parti" of Michelangelo, rather vague phrasing that has been much discussed. One translation could be "under the direction and in certain parts to the designs" of Michelangelo, but this and other possibilities leave room for a wide range of interpretations. Sebastiano intended to charge for the painting based on the number of figures in it, a common way of valuing paintings at the time.

Compositional drawings for the figures of Lazarus and his two attendants were supplied by Michelangelo. In addition to the drawing in the British Museum illustrated here, there are other drawings by Michelangelo there and in Bayonne, all of Lazarus and the two men supporting him, except for one of a foot, perhaps relating to Christ. Modern imaging techniques show that a different figure of Lazarus exists in the underdrawing, which was apparently changed to match one of Michelangelo's drawings (illustrated below) while painting was in progress, perhaps when Michelangelo visited Rome in January 1518. A drawing by Sebastiano seems to contain a sketch for this figure as well as one for the Saint Peter in the painting.

In Frankfurt there is a drawing by Sebastiano of the figure of Martha, which is close to the painted figure. The existence of more drawings by Michelangelo, now lost, for at least the figure of Christ, has been postulated by some scholars. In addition, there are a number of letters between the artists and others which record the progress of the commission. These reflect that Michelangelo was away from Rome during the period of painting, and would only have seen the half-finished work when he made a visit in January 1518. In particular Leonardo Sellaio was a trusted assistant to Michelangelo, who remained in Rome reporting on progress.

Although completed by the start of 1519, the completed painting was apparently only exhibited to a wider public in the Vatican in late December 1519 and then again in the following April, before being sent to Narbonne. In the second exhibition, from 12 April 1520, it was shown together with Raphael's Transfiguration. Raphael had died on April 6, and his Transfiguration came straight from being displayed by his body as it lay in state in his studio. In the event, as described by Vasari, both paintings were praised, but the Raphael much preferred, and only the Sebastiano was sent to Narbonne.

=== France and England ===
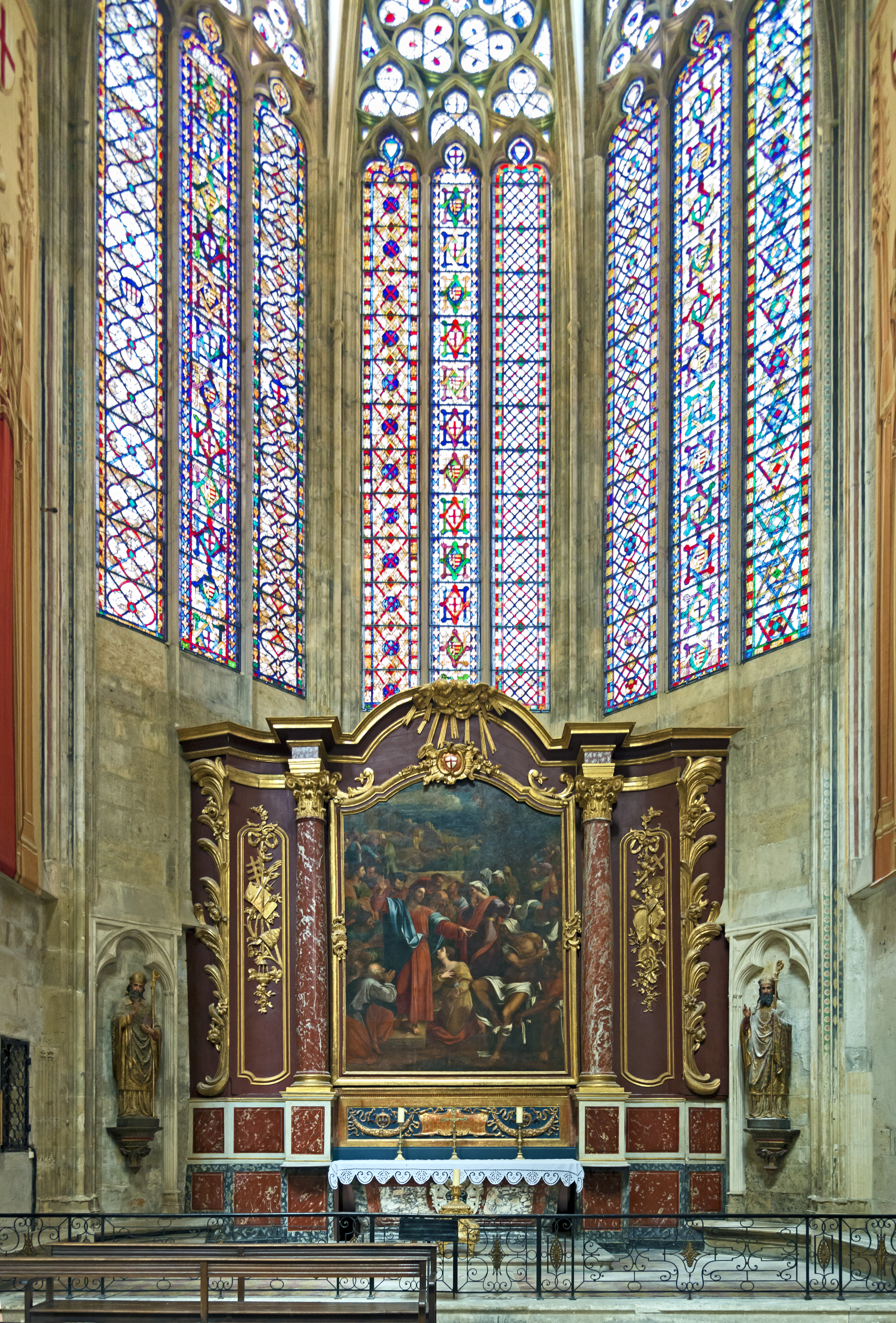
The copy now in Narbonne Cathedral. The original plinth of the frame can be seen below the painting.

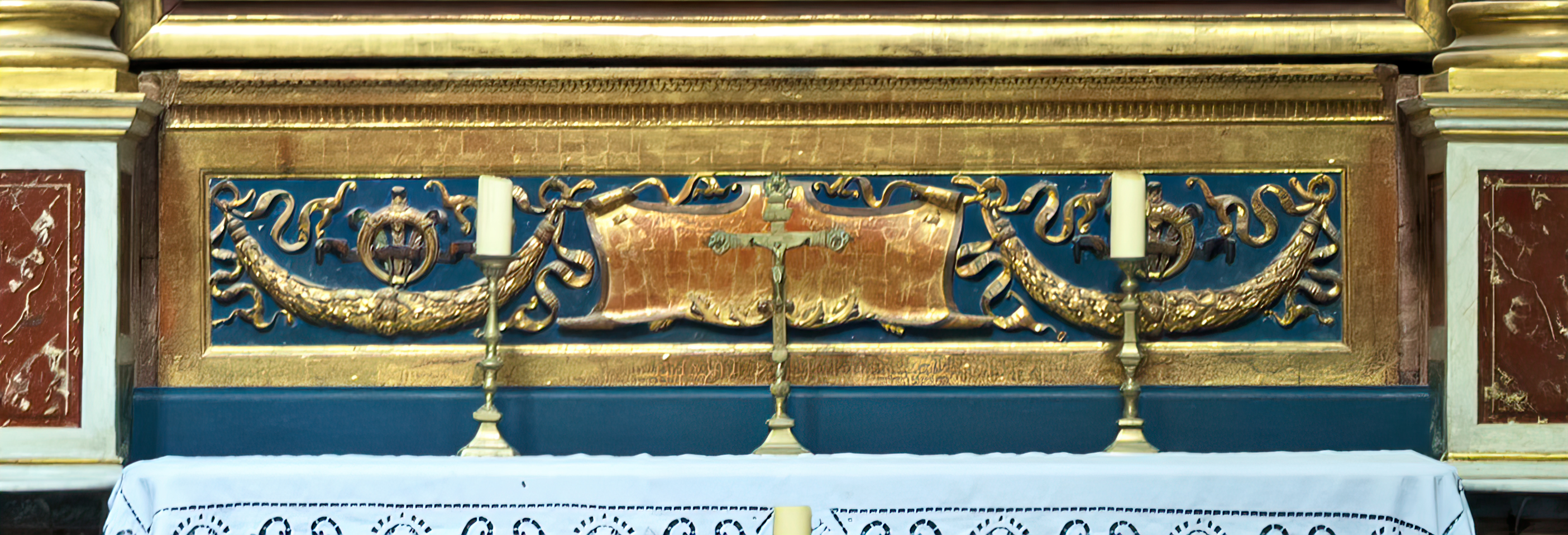
Enlarged detail from above; the 16th-century base of the frame, copied in the new London frame.

In 1722, the Regent of France, Philippe II, Duke of Orléans, persuaded the Narbonne authorities to let him have the painting for the Orleans Collection in Paris, which was soon effectively open to the public in the magnificent setting of the Palais-Royal, the Paris seat of the Dukes of Orléans. He died the following year, and the replica replacement promised as part of the purchase was eventually sent around 1750; it was probably by Charles-André van Loo and still hangs in the cathedral.

The making of the frames had been a cause of argument between Raphael and Sebastiano. Perhaps as a tactic to prevent a public side-by-side display in Rome, Raphael wanted the frames made on arrival in France, but Sebastiano insisted they be made in Rome. Sebastiano evidently prevailed, as below the replica in Narbonne the altar still has part of a "sophisticated" frame in gold on blue that carries above the two festoons the Medici impresa of a diamond ring with feathers rising through it, and the motto SEMPER ("always"), and is presumed to be from Rome. This is now treated as a predella or shelf below the frame of the copy.

Probably in 1771, Sebastiano's painting was transferred from wooden panel to canvas and some of the pigments have as a result lost their brightness, most notably the red of Christ's robe, which has turned pink.

No doubt because it soon left Rome for the artistic backwater of Narbonne, the earliest print of the painting was remarkably late, in an illustrated account of the Orleans Collection, published in 1786 on the eve of its dispersal. This was by R. De Launay, and in reverse.

The painting was sold in 1792, included in a block purchase of the Orleans Collection. It came to London in 1793 and was eventually acquired by the English consortium set up to disperse the collection. In one of the auction sales dedicated to the collection beginning on 26 December 1798 The Raising of Lazarus was bought by the London banker John Julius Angerstein, apparently at the urging of Sir Thomas Lawrence. The price was very high at 3,500 guineas. Because of its importance it was catalogued as No. 1 in Angerstein's catalogue, and when the Angerstein collection was bought by the British government in 1824 for the foundation of the National Gallery the canvas was now catalogued as NG1, making it officially the first painting to enter the National Gallery.

In the exhibition Michelangelo & Sebastiano at the National Gallery (ended 25 June 2017) it was shown together with several of the preparatory drawings for it by both artists, and letters between them. For the exhibition the National Gallery gave the painting a permanent new frame, with the bottom copying the original element still in Narbonne Cathedral. This is in blue and gold, with a cartouche and Medici devices, and there are two gilded and decorated classical columns at the sides, with an elaborate pediment above. It is thought possible that the original frame was designed by Michelangelo.

== Restoration history ==
Despite its large size, the painting was originally painted on wood panels. The wood used cannot now be identified, but it seems that, like Raphael's Transfiguration, the panel used a number of vertical boards, where a Venetian painting would be more likely to use horizontal ones. In the 1770s there was a large campaign of restoration of the paintings in the Orleans Collection, which included transferring this and many others from panel to canvas. According to the National Gallery's detailed account of the restoration history and current condition of the painting: "There can be little doubt that this drastic and dangerous intervention was totally unnecessary". Much damage to the painting seems to have resulted, and the connoisseur and art theorist Richard Payne Knight wrote that "those who have only seen it since that fatal operation ... can form but very imperfect notions of what it was before".

In the 1820s the artist Benjamin West, the painting's "most vocal admirer", is recorded as restoring and repainting damaged areas on Lazarus' right leg. It was re-varnished in 1834, 1852, and 1867, and cleaned and re-varnished in 1881, after which a sheet of glass was added to protect it from London's air. After the painting was evacuated in 1939 to Penrhyn Castle to protect it from the risk of German bombing in World War II, losses of paint from flaking were noticed, and various attempts in the following years to stabilize the situation failed.

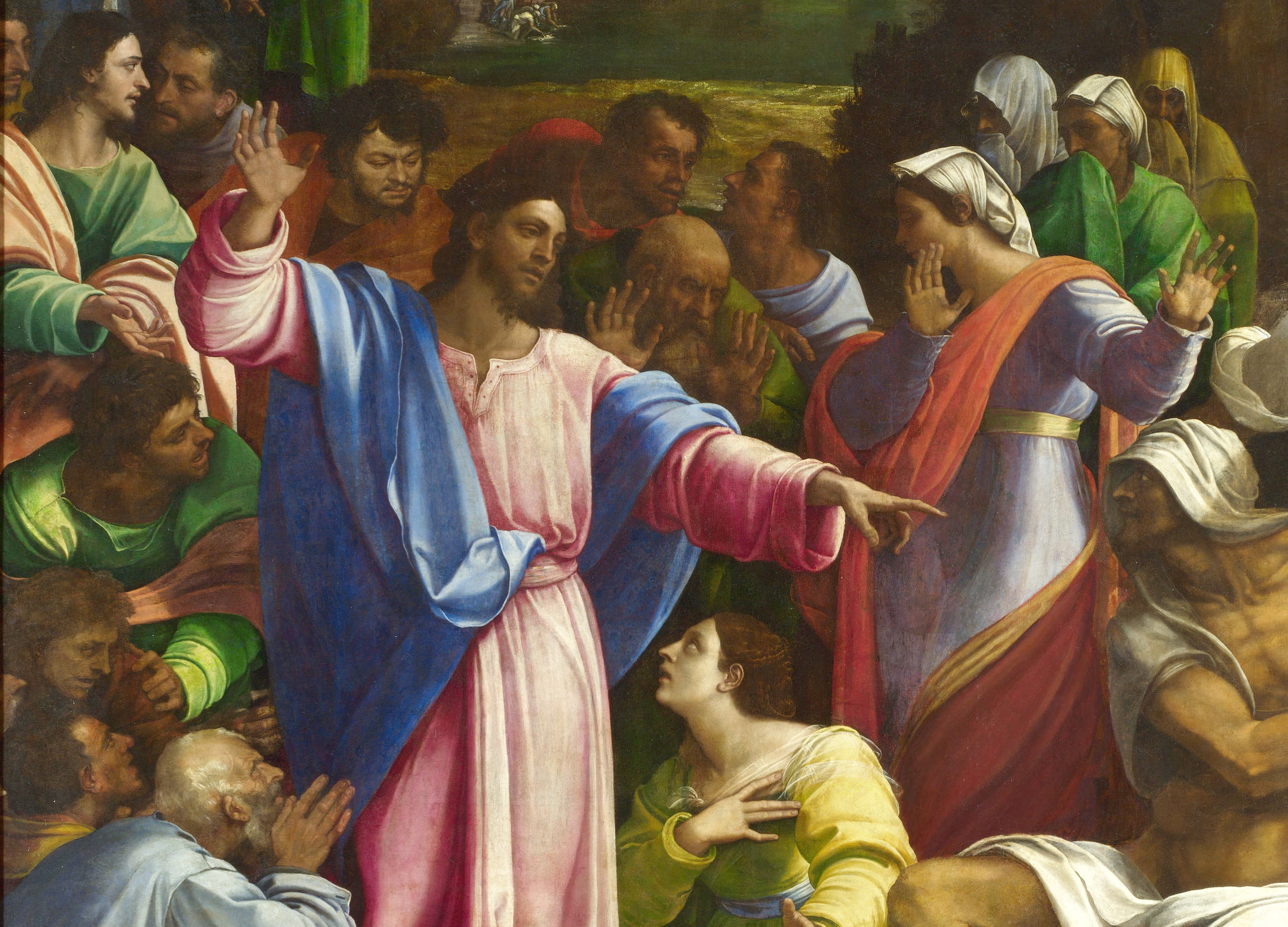
The central figures

In 1958 a major re-structuring of the support was done, aimed at reducing the presence of glue in several layers of canvas underneath the paint. These layers were contracting, causing the paint to lift and flake. It was thought that there were four canvas layers, of which it was planned to remove three. However, as the work was carried out the "alarming discovery" was made that the layer nearest to the paint was actually not canvas but sheets of paper, badly decayed and partly separated from the ground to the paint. The plan was changed to add layers of warm wax-resin in which an inert synthetic textile was fixed, before attaching to a composite board and paper honeycomb solid support. This method would be unlikely to be used today, but did stabilize the flaking. By 2009 it was tending to flex when the painting is moved, so this is now avoided as far as possible.

After the new support was added much old varnish was removed, and limited retouching performed. The extensive work, and condition of the painting, allowed the taking of an unusually large number of paint samples, which have now been re-examined using the more advanced scientific techniques available in the 2000s. This has allowed a good idea of the many complex mixtures of pigments used.

With the equipment available in 2009, full examination with imaging techniques that allow underpainting to be seen was not possible. It was thought that this might shed more light on any contribution by Michelangelo to the underpainting, as it has for the Viterbo Pietà, Sebastiano's first major collaboration with Michelangelo. By 2017, imaging had indeed revealed that the present figure of Lazarus, based on Michelangelo's drawing, lay over a different figure, presumably designed by Sebastiano.
