= Venus and Mars (Veronese) =

Painting by Paolo Veronese

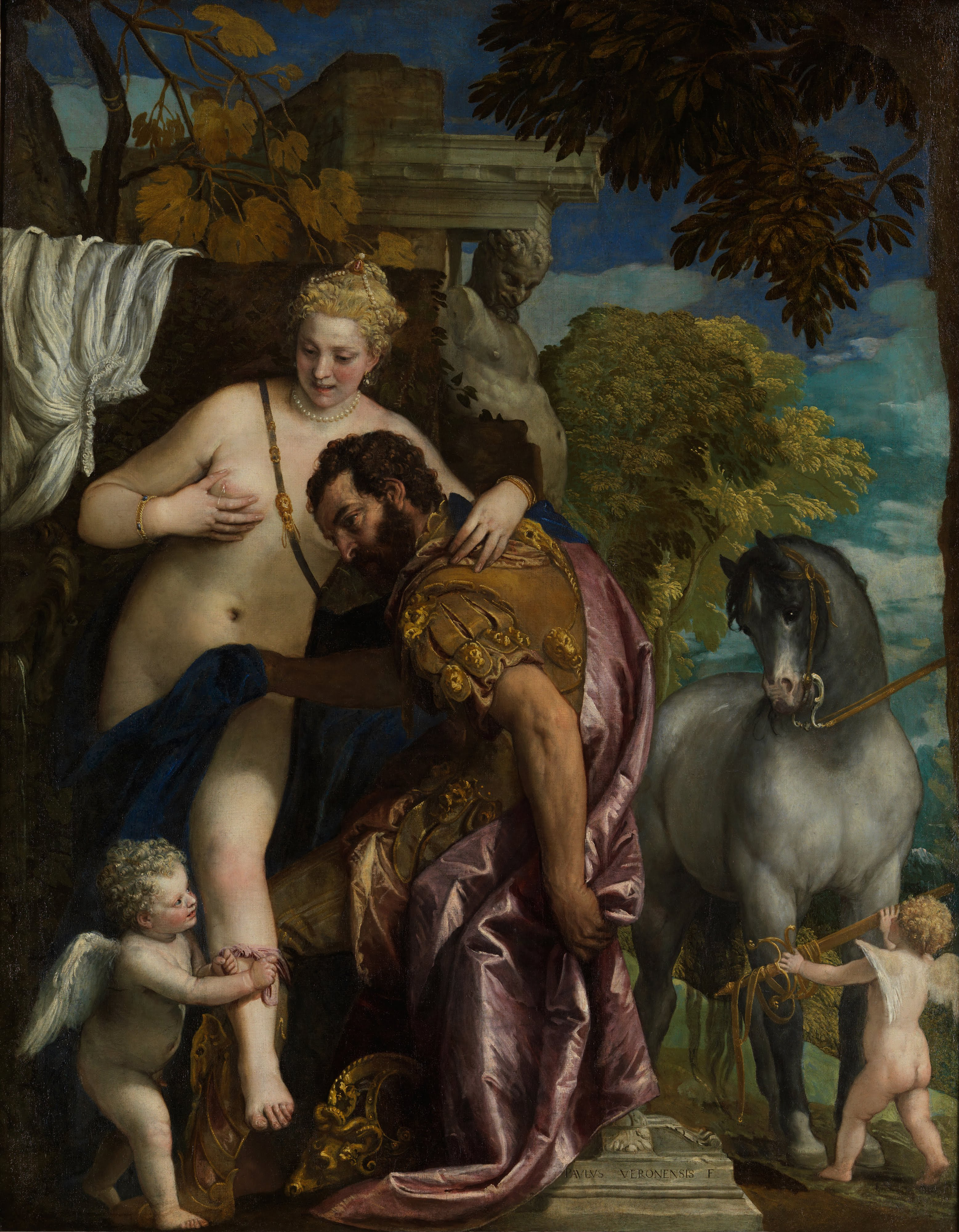
- Artist: Paolo Veronese
- Year: 1570s
- Medium: oil paint
- Movement: Venetian school
- Dimensions: 205.7 cm (81.0 in) × 161 cm (63 in)
- Location: Metropolitan Museum of Art
- Accession: 10.189
- Website: Metropolitan Museum of Art

Venus and Mars is an oil painting on canvas painted in the 1570s by the Italian Renaissance artist Paolo Veronese.

The painting was commissioned by Rudolf II, Holy Roman Emperor and was one of three mythological and love-themed works commissioned by the artist. The other two are at the Frick Collection in New York: The Allegory of Virtue and Performance and Allegory of the Source of Wisdom and Power. It deals with the romantic love of the Roman goddess of love Venus and the god of war Mars, as described in Ovid's Metamorphoses.

== Description ==
The meeting of the two lovers takes place in idyllic, peaceful scenery. On the left stands the naked goddess, with her left hand embracing Mars, who sits in front of her in armor. The right hand of Venus rests on her breast from which milk flows, emphasizing her femininity. On the right side, there is a war horse of the god of war. Its silhouette is based on antique sculpture. The underlined musculature of the animal expresses his strength, and his inclined head and calm eyes soften his image. The two putti shown are the key to the interpretation of the work. The first, taming the horse, symbolizes the subduction of the love desires of the god of Mars, the control over passions. The second putto, which tied the ribbon around Venus' legs, symbolizes the union of lovers into eternal love and harmony in a time without wars. Milk from the breast of Venus symbolizes the wealth of peace, which is the food for humanity. The artist signed on a stone disc: "PAVLUS VERONENSIS F".

== Interpretation ==
Veronese repeatedly repainted his work. X-ray study described by Alan Burroughs in his book Art Criticism from a Laboratory showed that the arrangement of Venus's body was different and was probably covered with drapery pulling downwards. The innocent cherub was not in the original version. It is not clear why Veronese made these changes.

== Provenance ==
In 1621, a catalog was made of the works in the collection of Rudolf II in Prague Castle. Over the centuries, the painting had many owners and circulated throughout Europe. It was in the possession of Ferdinand III of Habsburg, and after the Swedes' invasion of Prague in 1648, it entered the collection of Queen Christina of Sweden and was taken with her in her Roman exile. It then went to the Odescalchici family, and later to the famous Orleans Collection in Paris. In 1792, it went to the Edouard de Walckiers collection in Brussels but returned to Paris in 1798, and then went to London. After several English owners, in 1910 it was sold to the Metropolitan Museum of Art.
