= Aon =

Aon or AON may refer to:

== Business and administration ==
- Aon (company), a global professional services firm
  - Aon Training Complex, the sponsored name of Trafford Training Centre
  - Aon Center, the name of two buildings:
    - Aon Center (Chicago)
    - Aon Center (Los Angeles)
- Precedence diagram method or activity on node, a type of diagram in:
  - Program evaluation and review technique

== Entertainment ==
- All or Nothing (sports docuseries), a brand of sports documentary series distributed on the Amazon Prime Video platform
- Art of Noise, a British electronic music group
- "Aon", a composition by jazz pianist Harold Mabern, c. 1968
- Aon, the fantasy universe setting of the role-playing game Lone Wolf series

== Other uses ==
- Aon (mythology), son of Poseidon in Greek mythology
- Aon (moth), a genus of moths in the family Erebidae
- Aon (trigraph), a Latin trigraph
- All or none (finance), a condition to fulfil an investor's order in its entirety or cancel it
- Alton railway station, from its National Rail code
- Angolan kwanza, from its ISO currency code
- Application-oriented networking, a computer networking technology
- Active optical network, a form of fiber-optic communication delivery
- All-optical network, see Synchronous optical networking

== See also ==
- Aion (disambiguation)
- Aeon (disambiguation)
- Eon (disambiguation)
