= Eon =

Eon, EON or Eons may refer to:

== Time ==
- Aeon, an indefinite long period of time
- Eon (geology), a division of the geologic time scale

== Arts and entertainment ==
=== Fictional characters ===
- Eon, in the 2007 film Ben 10: Race Against Time
- Eon, in the 1976 TV special Rudolph's Shiny New Year
- Master Eon, a character in Skylanders: Spyro's Adventure
- Eon, a character in the TV series Iron Kid

=== Film ===
- Eon Films, a Mexican film distributor
- Eon Productions, a British film production company

=== Games ===
- Eon (role-playing game)
- Eon Digital Entertainment, a British computer games publisher
- Eon Products, an American game company

=== Literature ===
- Eon (novel), by Greg Bear, 1985
- Eon (magazine), for players of Eve Online
- Eon, or The Two Pearls of Wisdom, a 2008 novel by Alison Goodman

=== Music ===
- Eon (album), a 1975 album by Richard Beirach, including a track "Eon"
- Eon, a 2008 album by Grafton Primary
- "Eon", a 2012 song by Celldweller from Wish Upon a Blackstar
- Eons, a 2014 album by Mimicking Birds
- "Eons", a song on the album Soundsystem by 311
- EōN, a 2019 music app by Jean-Michel Jarre

=== Video ===
- PBS Eons, an American science video series

== People ==
- D'Eon, a surname
- Eon (musician) (1954–2009), British musician
- Mr. Eon, American rapper

=== Given name or nickname ===
- Eon (Korean given name)
- Éon de l'Étoile (died 1150), Breton religious leader
- Eon of Axum, 5th-century King of Axum
- Eon Densworth (born 1938), former Australian rules footballer
- Eon Hooper (born 1991), Guyanese cricketer
- Kim Eon (born 1973), Korean poet
- Lee Eon (1981–2008), South Korean actor and model
- Eon McKai (born 1979), American director of pornographic films
- Ali Shama, American visual artist

=== Surname ===
- Chevalier d'Éon (Charles-Geneviève-Louis-Auguste-André-Timothée d'Éon de Beaumont, 1728–1810), French diplomat who lived as a woman
- Daniel Eon (born 1939), French footballer

== Places ==
- Eon Mountain, in Canada

== Transport ==
- Edaran Otomobil Nasional, a Malaysian car distributor
- Elliotts of Newbury, a British aircraft manufacturer
  - Elliotts of Newbury Eon, a monoplane built 1947–1950
- Hyundai Eon, an automobile

== Other uses ==
- eOn, a distributed computing project
- E.ON, a European holding company and electric utility
- Enhanced other networks
- Triple M Melbourne, an Australian radio station originally EON FM
- Eons.com, a former social networking website
- Eon TV, digital television provider
- National Youth Organisation (Greece), active 1936–1941

== See also ==
- Aeon (disambiguation)
- Aion (disambiguation)
- Eonian (disambiguation)
