= Strophia (mythology) =

In Greek mythology, Strophia (Ancient Greek: Στροφίη) was a naiad nymph of a spring on Thebes.

== Family ==
Strophia was the daughter of the Boeotian river-god Ismenus. She was sister to Dirce and possibly of other naiads: Crocale and Ismenis. The younger Linus, music teacher of Heracles, was probably her brother as well.

== Mythology ==
Strophia was only mentioned in the account of Callimachus as one of the rivers and springs that fled from the pregnant goddess Leto in fear of Hera's wrath if they provide refuge for her.

"Fled, too, Aonia (Boeotia) on the same course, and Dirke and Strophia, holding the hands of their sire, dark-pebbled Ismenos.”
