= Aion =

Aion or AION may refer to:

== Arts, entertainment, and media ==
=== Literature ===
- Aion (manga), a 2008 manga by Yuna Kagesaki
- AION Linguistica, a linguistic journal
- Aion: Researches into the Phenomenology of the Self, a book by Carl Jung

=== Music ===
- Aion (Dead Can Dance album), a 1990 album by Dead Can Dance
- Aion (band), a Japanese metal band
  - Aion (Aion album), their 1992 album
- Aion (CMX album), a 2003 album by CMX
- Aiōn, orchestral composition by Anna S. Þorvaldsdóttir premiered in 2019

=== Other ===
- Aion (Chrono Crusade), the main villain of the anime series Chrono Crusade
- Aion (video game), a 2008 Korean multiplayer online game by NCsoft

== Businesses and organizations ==
- GAC Aion, a Chinese electric vehicle manufacturer owned by GAC Group
- Aion Bank

== Mythology ==
- Greek αἰών "time, eternity; age"; see Aeon
  - Aion (deity), "Aeon" personified in Hellenistic religion
  - Aeon (Gnosticism), one of the Gnostic terms for "emanations of God"

== Science and technology ==
- Anterior ischemic optic neuropathy (AION), a medical condition involving loss of vision
- Cleverpath AION Business Rules Expert, a programming language, originally AION

== Other uses ==
- Aion language, a Ramu language of Papua New Guinea
- House of Aion, an ancient Roman villa that is part of the Paphos Archaeological Park

== See also ==
- Aeon (disambiguation)
- Alon (disambiguation)
- Aon (disambiguation)
- Eon (disambiguation)
- Ion (disambiguation)
