= Ismenis =

Figure from Greek mythology

In Greek mythology, Ismenis (Ancient Greek: Ἰσμηνίς) was a naiad nymph, one of the daughters of the Boeotian river god Ismenus: Ismenis is a patronymic rather than a given name.

== Family ==
Given her parentage, Ismenis was probably the sister to other naiads: Dirce, Strophia and Crocale. The younger Linus, the music teacher of Heracles, was possibly a brother of hers.

In Statius' Thebaid, Ismenis was the mother, by Pan, of Crenaeus, a defender of Thebes in the war of the Seven against Thebes.

== Mythology ==
When Crenaeus was killed by Hippomedon whom he had challenged to single combat, Ismenis searched for his body which was carried away by the flow of River Ismenus, and, upon finding it, lamented her son's fate.
