= Diana and Actaeon (Titian) =

1550s painting by Titian

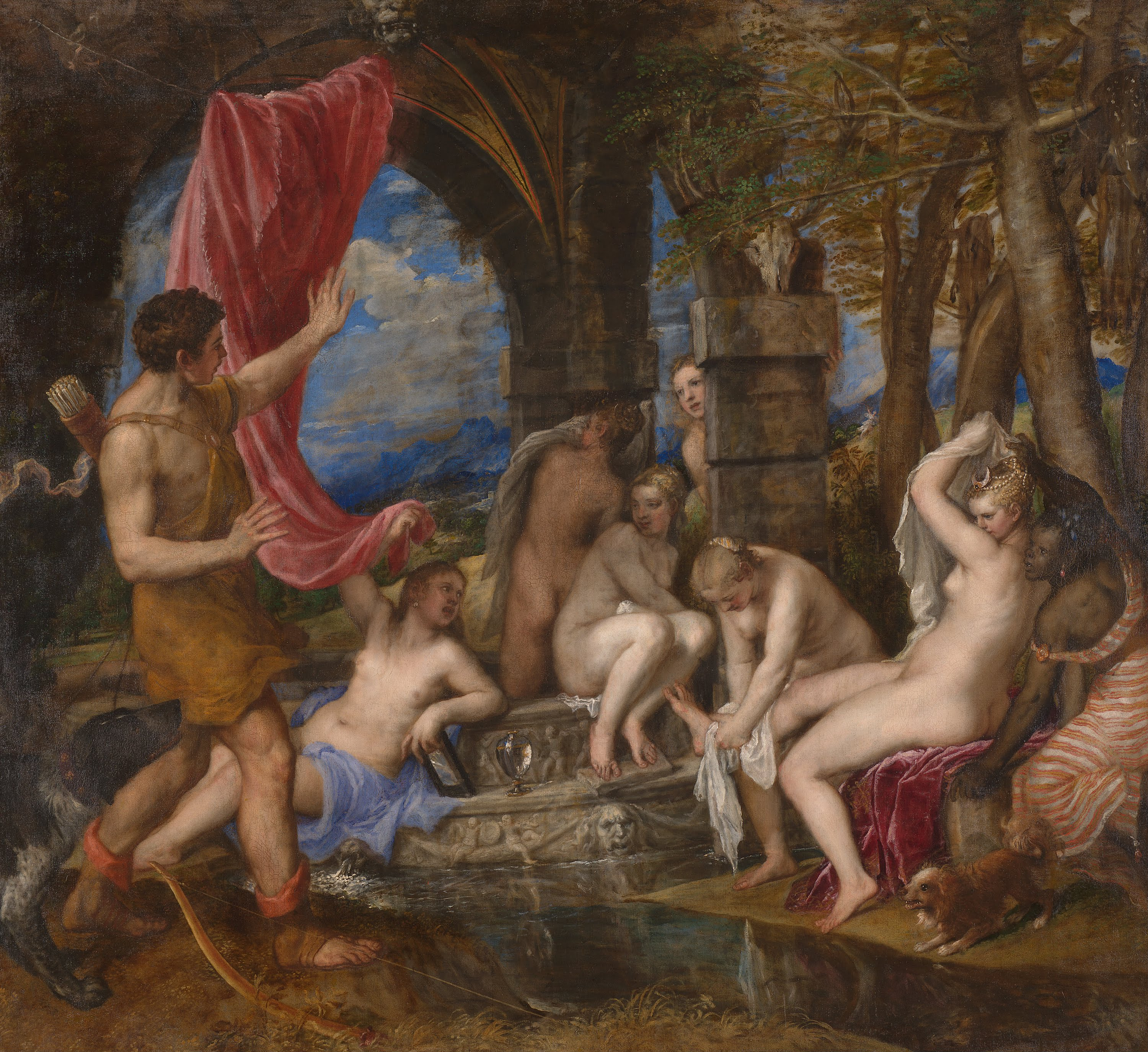
- Artist: Titian
- Year: 1556–1559
- Medium: Oil on canvas
- Dimensions: 185 cm × 202 cm (73 in × 80 in)
- Location: National Gallery, London (in 2024) and Scottish National Gallery; London and Edinburgh

Diana and Actaeon is a large painting by the Italian Renaissance painter Titian, finished in 1556–1559, and is considered amongst Titian's greatest works. It portrays the moment in which the hunter Actaeon comes across the goddess Diana and her nymphs as they are bathing. Diana is furious, and will turn Actaeon into a stag, who is then pursued and killed by his own hounds, a scene Titian later painted in his The Death of Actaeon (National Gallery).

The story is typically located in woodland with very few structures aside from small works like walls and fountains. Titian adjusts this traditional setting by placing his characters in the arched stone ruins of a forest temple. Diana is the pale woman second from the right. She is wearing a crown with a crescent moon on it and is being covered by the dark skinned woman at the extreme right who may be her servant. The nymphs display a variety of reactions, and a variety of nude poses.

In 2008–2009, the National Gallery, London and National Galleries of Scotland successfully campaigned to acquire the painting from the Bridgewater Collection for £50 million. As a result, Diana and Actaeon, along with its pair Diana and Callisto, will remain on display in the UK, and will alternate between the two galleries on five-year terms. In late 2024 the painting was on display in Room 29 of the National Gallery in London.

Diana and Actaeon is the fourth of seven paintings made by Titian for Phillip II as a part of his poesie series and was painted at the same time and using the same style as the fifth painting in the series Diana and Callisto.

== Description ==
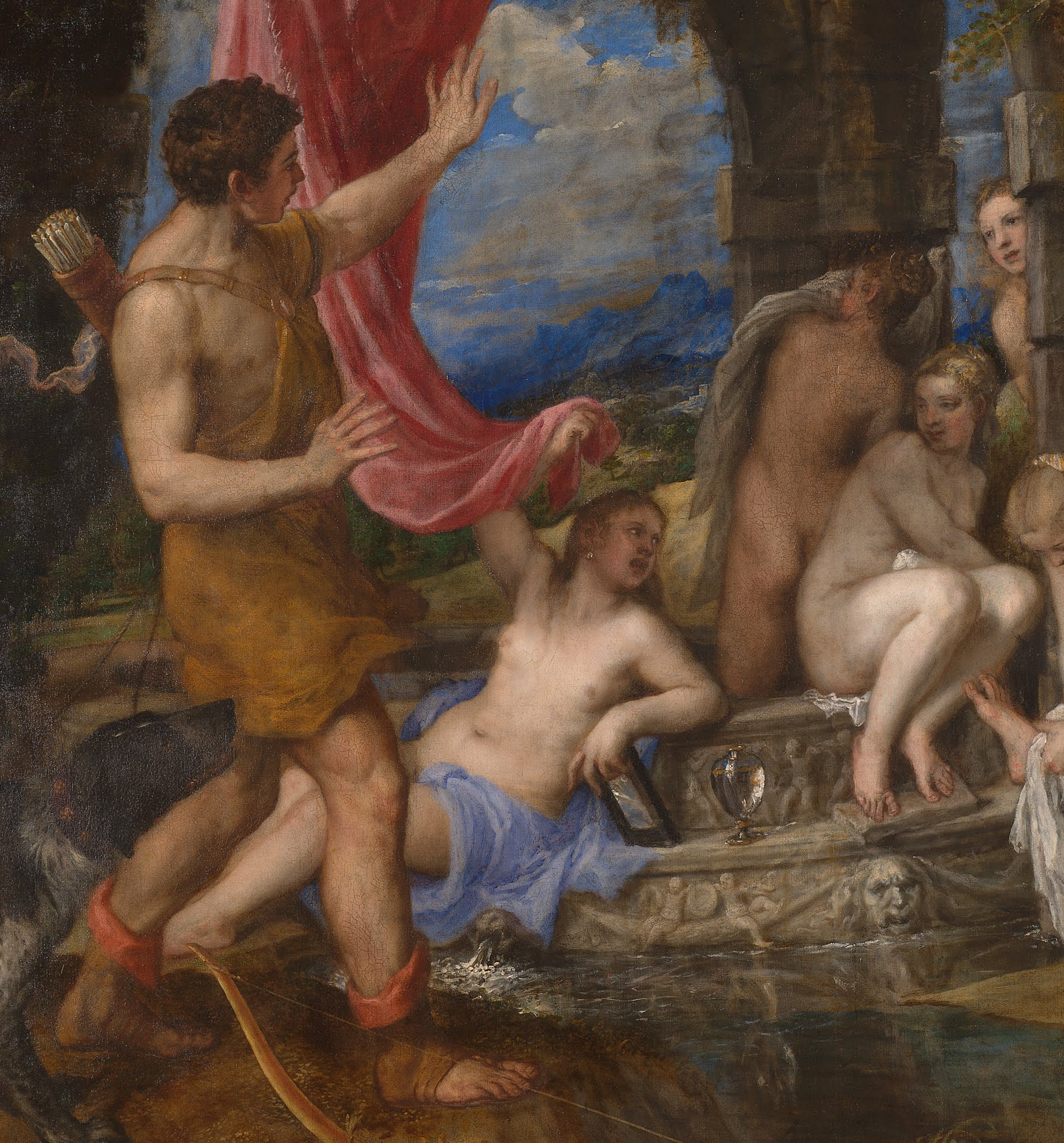
Detail with Actaeon and nymphs

The painting depicts the seminal scene from the second story in book three of the Roman poet Ovid’s Metamorphoses. In the poem, Actaeon, grandson of Cadmus, calls off his friends after a successful hunt due to hot weather and inadvertently wanders off into the valley of Gargaphia, the sacred realm of Diana, the goddess of the hunt. Eventually, Actaeon depicted on the left side of the painting, finds himself in the woods of Boetia wherein he stumbles upon a stream and decides to follow it. This stream happens to be a sacred stream that leads to a grotto where Diana and her nymphs have chosen to bathe after a long successful hunt. Without paying attention, Actaeon and his dogs soon arrive at the grotto from the left side of the painting and startle the bathing nymphs and Goddess with their presence. Reeling in surprise from the arrival of the intruder, the nymphs at the centre of the composition hurry to cover themselves while looking desperately to Diana for guidance.

The Nymphs historically have been called Crocale, Nephele, Hyale, Rhanis, Psecas, Phiale, and Titania, although specific differentiations between the seven or the whereabouts of the last two nymphs have remained unknown since only five nymphs appear in the painting. Crocale, Nephele, Hyale, Rhanis, Psecas, and Phiale are known as Oceanids, a title given to the roughly three thousand water nymphs who were the daughters of the Titans Oceanus and Tethys; 60 of whom including these were chosen to be the handmaidens of Diana. The name Titania is a term employed by Ovid to describe the daughters of Titans, though this specific instance doesn't seem to allude to a specific character from Greek mythology or any character in this composition. Diana sits at the far right of the composition with her body turned as if to hide herself from the viewer as well as her assailant. She is wearing a crown with a crescent moon on it and is being covered by a dark-skinned maidservant and is accompanied by a small brown dog who barks at Actaeon from Diana’s feet. The nymphs display a variety of reactions and nude poses that help illustrate the exact moment of conflict before Diana’s next move. Furious at the thought of being seen naked by a man, Diana as a result of this incursion will then splash the unfortunate Actaeon with water, causing him to transform into a stag who is then pursued and ultimately killed by his own hounds which are shown eagerly crowding around the hunter's feet at the bottom left. Titian would later portray this continuation of the narrative in his 1575 painting The Death of Actaeon (National Gallery).

== Visual analysis ==
=== Iconography ===
The environment of Diana and Actaeon is littered with contextual symbolism that alludes to both the coming events following the confrontation as well as to artistic conventions at the time. As described in Metamorphoses, the scene takes place in a land that Ovid describes as nature in imitation of art: “From out its rocky clefts the waters flow, And trickling swell into a lake below. Nature had ev’ry where so plaid her part, That ev’ry where seem’d to vie with art.” The poet’s juxtaposition of the formations of nature imitating those of Renaissance art reflects nature's reclamation of the ruins as well as acting as a subtle reference to the motifs that would go on to influence Titian’s unique architectural adaptation of the narrative setting.

In the original poem, the setting was described as “A spacious grotto, all around o’er-grown With hoary moss, and arch’d with pumice stone.” The arch itself, as described in the poem, has traditionally been depicted as a naturally occurring structure commonly referred to as “nativum arcum”; however, as a result of deep synthesis of the subject matter Titian instead substituted these natural forms by replacing the grotto with the ruins of a Gothic cathedral and adding a rusticated stone column in the centre of the fountain that the nymphs bathe in. These artistic adaptations were both symbolic and stylistic due to the cultural stigmas attached to the Gothic and Rustic design styles which many Renaissance artists associated with the artlessness of natural forms.

From the time of the Romans to the Renaissance, the construction of private grottos for hosting parties and displaying art was a popular practice amongst the 16th-century elite of Europe where rustication was a sought-after skill that was utilized to thin the line between natural and man-made features. The practice of rustication was a form of masonry design practiced since antiquity and predominantly reserved for constructs like aqueducts, grottos, and fountains due to their designs being derivative of natural elements and formations.

Perched on top of one of the columns is the skull of a stag which happens to be in direct eyesight of Actaeon and alongside the deer pelts hanging from the branches next to it, acts as a means of symbolic foreshadowing of the future that is to befall the young nobleman. Titian had originally included the signature "TITANVS F" vertically on the column, however, it would eventually be mistaken for graffiti and removed by conservationists in 1932. By positioning the column among the nymphs near the centre of the composition, Titian was able to direct the viewer's gaze upwards toward the arched structure in the background. The structure itself resembles that of a high Gothic cathedral that makes use of a groin vault with pointed arches, as well as semicircle rusticated arches and rusticated piers. In other architectural terms, this formation can be described as a tetrapylon, due to its positioning of two intersecting avenues that form right angles and stand over a crossroads. The keystone of the arch facing the viewer is carved with the visage of a lion which is assumed to have been a subtle nod to the city of Venice which was an adoptive home of the artist. Another subtle reference to Venice may be found in the small mirror and Venetian glass carafe located on the bottom step of the fountain which were common symbols used in Annunciation images from the period that represented the virginity of the Virgin Mary which was adapted for Diana in this instance. In addition to chastity, the carafe also stood as a symbol of sight, clarity, and the calm that would return to the group upon the disposal of the unlucky hunter.

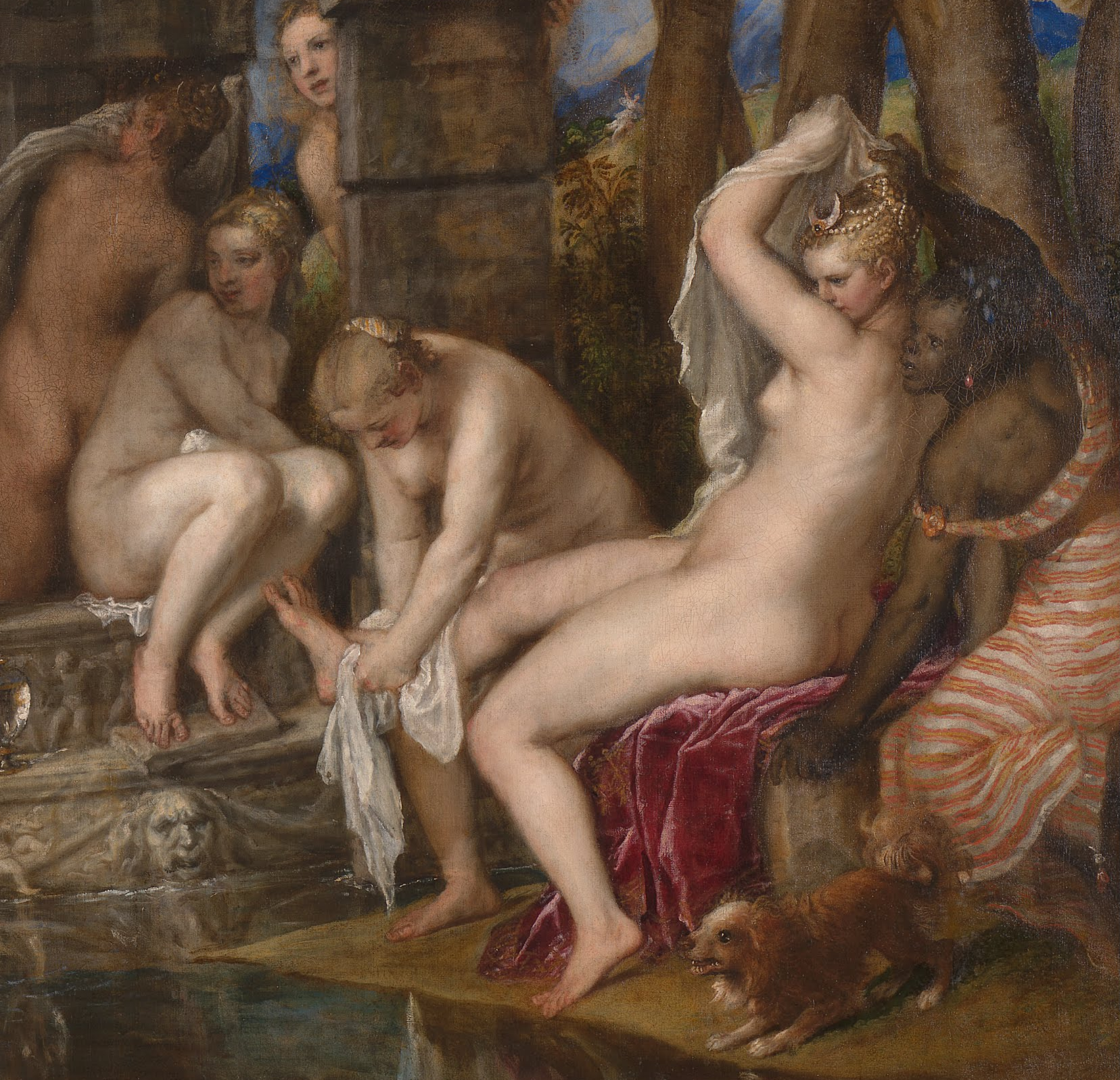
The group around Diana

Shifting focus to the bottom right of the composition we find Diana who is seated facing away from the viewer and is aided by a maidservant and a small dog, both of which were common iconographical inclusions in renaissance compositions as symbolic allegories of fidelity. X-ray scans of the painting have shown that the maid was originally painted as a white person and was later painted over to her current black appearance, which was most likely done in an attempt to make her more easily discernible from the surrounding nymphs as well as to seem more exotic to the European consumer. The symbol of the crescent moon which is synonymous with Diana is depicted in the silver brooch worn on Diana's head, as well as the curved back of her maidservant's dress; the juxtaposition of the fair skinned goddess and the dark-skinned maidservant is also believed to be symbolic of the light and dark sides of the moon.

=== Formal analysis ===
Titian's mythological epic is depicted in a classical style reminiscent of the masters of the early renaissance that took influence from both the art of antiquity as well as the remnants of medieval art that were still on display throughout most of Europe. A major factor that separated Titian from many other Renaissance artists was his adoption of the colorito technique which utilized the consistent mixing and layering of pigments and freehanded brushwork to create a more naturalized appearance to the composition. Titian's use of freehand brushstrokes came to be viewed as having sprezzatura, which describes the almost effortless movements of the brush resulting in what some called an unfinished or non-finito final product. As a result of this new laid back approach, works like Diana and Actaeon would become widely influential and inspire adaptations of its style among many 16th century Italian painters. This methodology contrasted with the disegno method that was popular with Florentine contemporaries like Raphael and Michelangelo which favoured the use of preliminary model based sketches to achieve a more idealized depiction of their subjects.

By layering and mixing pigments to create more natural tones, Titian was able to utilize a more sombre colour palette to depict a wide range of emotional responses and positions with his subjects. Titian's evolution towards darker shades with sparing use of bold colours allowed the artist to incorporate elements of chiaroscuro and sfumato into his paintings to inflict emotional gravitas to the narratives while using brighter colours like white and red in this case to draw the viewer's attention to specific parts of the painting. This shift in style alongside his adoption of heavy brushwork are believed to be side effects of the aging artist's failing eyesight; since at the time of painting this work Titian was well into his late 60s.

The characters in their various states of dynamic movement are organized in a V-shaped composition that makes use of the titular characters to frame the narrative. Some scholars have described Diana and Actaeon as one of the first Baroque works due to its use of horizontals for compositional organization and the application of diagonals to demonstrate the physical motion of the poem's subjects. By framing the characters in this arrangement and placing Diana and Actaeon in the foreground, the viewer is immediately introduced to the main conflict between the two characters before taking into account the reactions of the maidservant, the dog, or the nymphs in the background.

In order to create an illusion of perspective in this natural setting, foreshortening was implemented in instances like the body of Actaeon where he is turned in a three quarter position facing away from the viewer which gives the illusion that he is moving towards the fountain containing the nymphs. The gothic ruins in the background also contain evidence of foreshortening as employed in the illustrated angles of the columns and the almost overlapping positions of the groin vault and the arched entryways at either end. One of Titian's main motivations for depicting his subjects in the nude was to prove the superiority of painting in the context of the paragone, a prominent debate amongst Renaissance artists that argued whether painting or sculpture were the superior form of fine art. The artist argues his perspective through his sensual and naturalistic depictions of human emotions on the physically idealized nude forms of the huddled nymphs. Each figure in the center of the painting is shown in the midst of a variety of reactions to the sudden intrusion of their privacy that reveals the artist's masterful understanding of the human anatomy and classical sculpture work as demonstrated through the many different angles that the nymphs and Diana are shown facing from the viewer's perspective. Despite their classical influence both in subject matter and depiction, Titian's portrayal of Diana and her nymphs aligns more with the mannerist methods employed by early Christians in their depictions of biblical characters. We see evidence of mannerism specifically on the spine of the nymph in the background who stands with her back turned towards the viewer; after close inspection, it can be noticed that her back is slightly longer than that of a normal human.

== Provenance ==
=== To 2005 ===
Diana and Actaeon is part of a series of seven famous canvases, the "poesies", depicting mythological scenes from Ovid's Metamorphoses painted for Philip II of Spain (after Maximilian II, Holy Roman Emperor had declined Titian's offer to paint them for him). The work remained in the Spanish royal collection until 1704, when King Philip V gave it to the French ambassador. It was soon acquired by Philippe II, Duke of Orléans, nephew of Louis XIV, and Regent of France during the minority of Louis XV, for his collection, one of the finest ever assembled. After the French Revolution, the Orleans collection was sold to a Brussels dealer by Louis Philippe II, Duke of Orléans in 1791, two years before he was guillotined. This dealer then exhibited many pictures from the collection (including the Titians) in London.

The largest share of the collection was thus bought in 1798 by the coal-magnate Francis Egerton, 3rd Duke of Bridgewater, including this painting, Titian's Diana and Callisto (from the same mythological series of seven paintings), eight paintings by Poussin, three Raphaels and Rembrandt's Self-Portrait, aged 51.

The third Duke of Bridgewater was probably inspired to buy the paintings by his nephew, Earl Gower, the ancestor of the Dukes of Sutherland. Certainly, on Bridgewater's death five years after the purchase, he bequeathed the Titians and the rest of the collection to Gower, who put it on display to the public in his London house – it has been on public display ever since. On first seeing the collection there, William Hazlitt wrote "I was staggered when I saw the works ... A new sense came upon me, a new heaven and a new Earth stood before me." On the outbreak of the Second World War in September 1939, the collection was moved from London to Scotland. Between 1945 and 2009, the Diana and Actaeon and Diana and Callisto (with other paintings from the collection, known collectively as "the Bridgewater loan" or "the Sutherland Loan") were on long-term display at the National Gallery of Scotland, in Edinburgh. As well as Hazlitt, during their time on public display they have inspired artists such as J. M. W. Turner and Lucian Freud – Freud described the pair as "simply the most beautiful pictures in the world".

=== 2008–present ===
The Sutherland collection has passed by descent to the 7th Duke of Sutherland, (most of whose wealth is contained in the paintings collection), but in late August 2008 the 7th Duke announced that he wished to sell some of the collection in order to diversify his assets. He had offered them as a pair to the British national galleries at £100 million (a third of their overall estimated market price) if they could demonstrate, by the end of 2008, the ability to raise that sum – if not, the pair or other paintings from the Bridgewater collection would be put on public auction early in 2009. Within days of the Duke's decision, the NGS and the National Gallery, London had announced they would combine forces to raise the sum, initially in the form of £50 million (or a demonstration that this money could be raised) to purchase Diana and Actaeon and paid over three years in installments and then £50 million for Diana and Callisto paid for similarly from 2013.

Though the campaign received some criticism for the Duke's motives or (from John Tusa and Nigel Carrington of the University of the Arts London) for distracting from funding art students, it gained press support from both the tabloid and broadsheet print media in the UK – imitative nude photoshoots of it were featured in both The Sun (using the newspaper's Page 3 models photoshopped onto the painting) and The Mirror (including the actor Kim Cattrall and featured in a piece by Andrew Graham-Dixon on The Culture Show). On 14 October 2008 the appeal received £1 million from the Art Fund and on 19 November this was followed by £10 million from the National Heritage Memorial Fund. From 22 October to 14 December 2008 it was put on display in Room 1 of the National Gallery in London to aid the public appeal – the only other painting in this temporary exhibition was the related The Death of Actaeon from the London National Gallery's collection, and they were illustrated by the relevant passages from Book 3 of Ovid's Metamorphoses in the John Dryden translation.

Speculation began when the original 31 December deadline passed without definite news and the Scottish Government's announcement of a contribution of £17.5 million in January 2009 triggered a political row, with Ian Davidson questioning the deal as a result of the 2008 financial crisis. There was also controversy over attempts to dilute the guarantee that the duke would sell no other of the paintings from the Sutherland Loan should the two Titians be bought. However, on 2 February 2009 it was announced that, thanks to the deadline being extended to raise more funds and finalize the payment plan for Diana and Callisto, the £50 million had been raised and Diana and Actaeon would be acquired. The final sum was made up of £12.5 million from the Scottish Government, £7.4 million from public donations, £12.5 million from the National Galleries in London, £10 million from the National Heritage Memorial Fund, £2 million from the Monument Trust, £4.6 million from the National Galleries of Scotland and £1 million was secured from the Art Fund. Diana and Actaeon will thus be displayed in Scotland for five years, then in London alongside The Death of Actaeon for five years, on an alternating basis.

== Titian's poesie series for Philip II ==
- Danaë, delivered to Philip 1553, now Wellington Collection, with earlier and later versions.
- Venus and Adonis, Museo del Prado, delivered 1554, and several other versions
- The Rape of Europa, c. 1560–1562, Isabella Stewart Gardner Museum
- Diana and Actaeon, 1556–1559, owned jointly by London's National Gallery and the National Gallery of Scotland in Edinburgh
- Diana and Callisto, 1556–1559, owned jointly by London's National Gallery and the National Gallery of Scotland in Edinburgh
- Perseus and Andromeda, Wallace Collection, c. 1553–1562
- The Death of Actaeon, National Gallery, never delivered and not always counted in the series, c. 1559 onwards
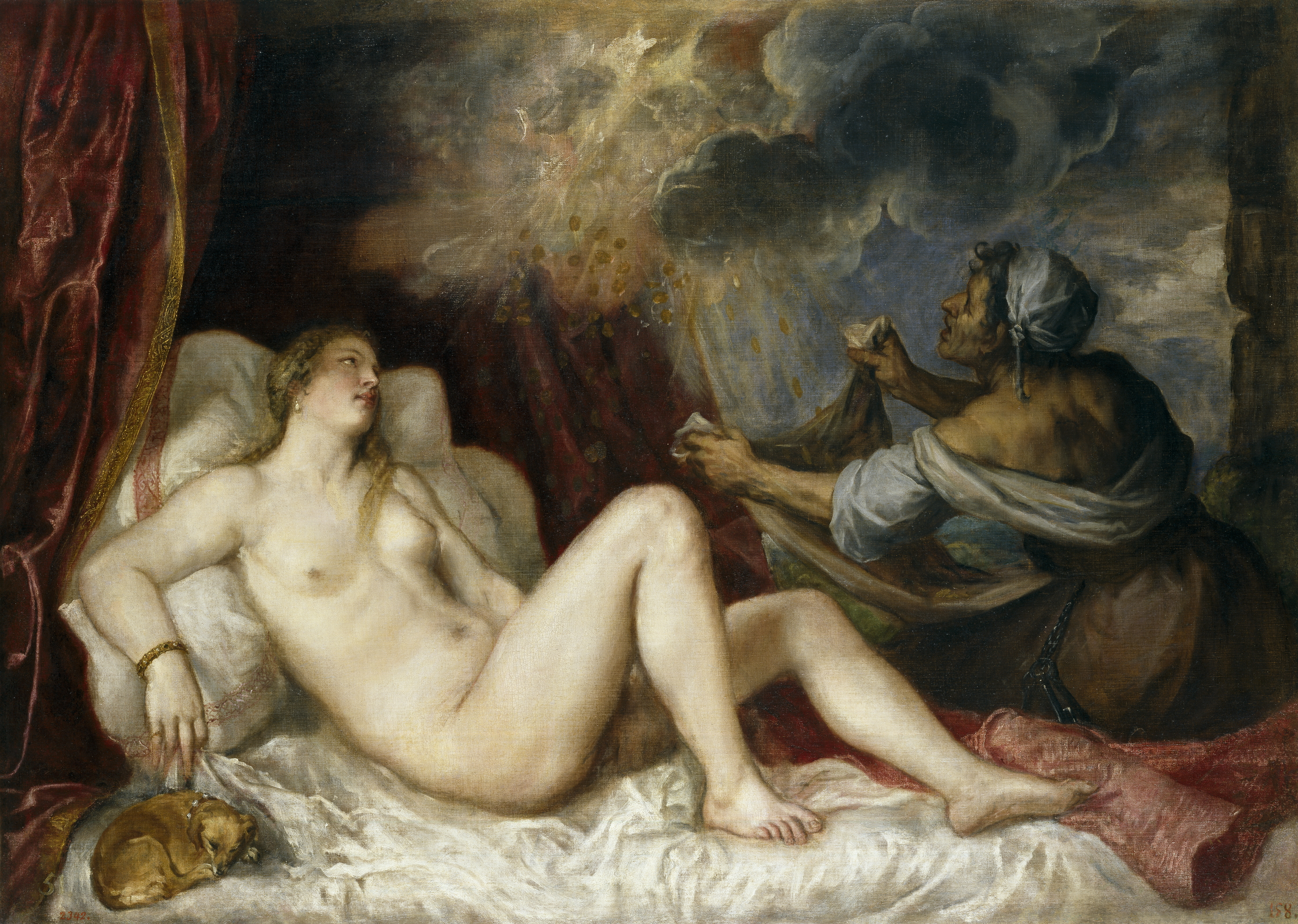
Danaë

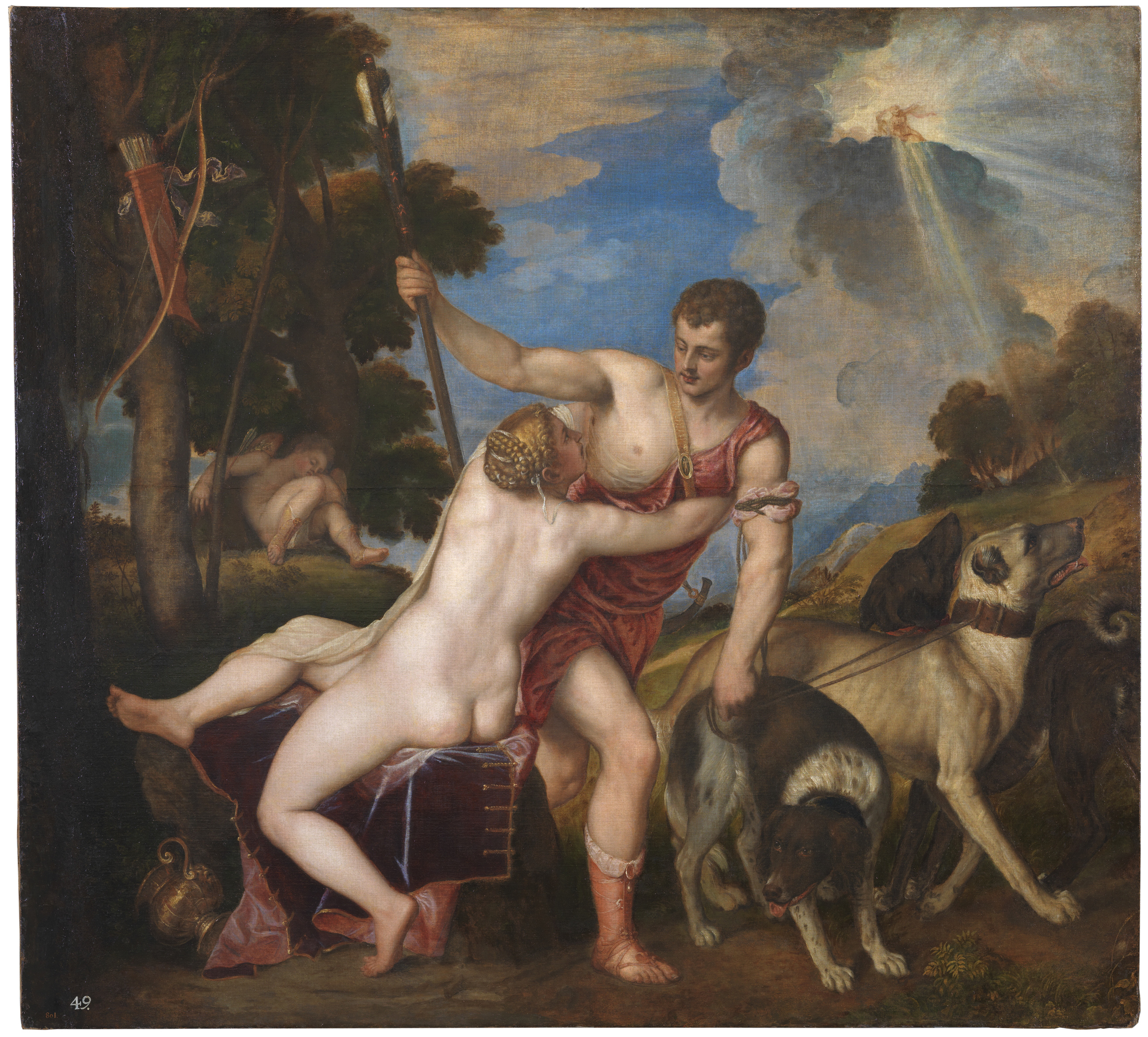
Venus and Adonis

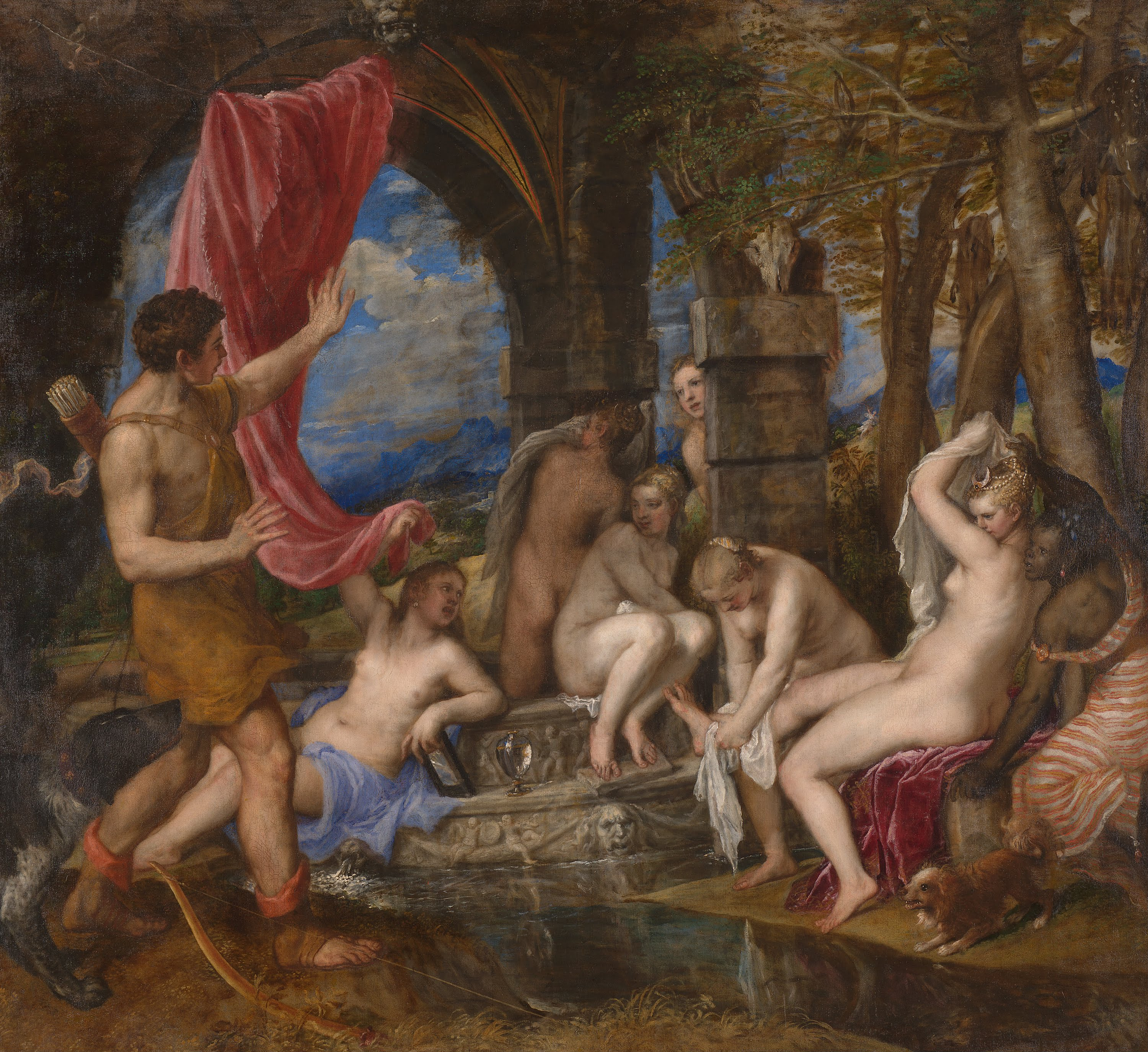
Diana and Actaeon

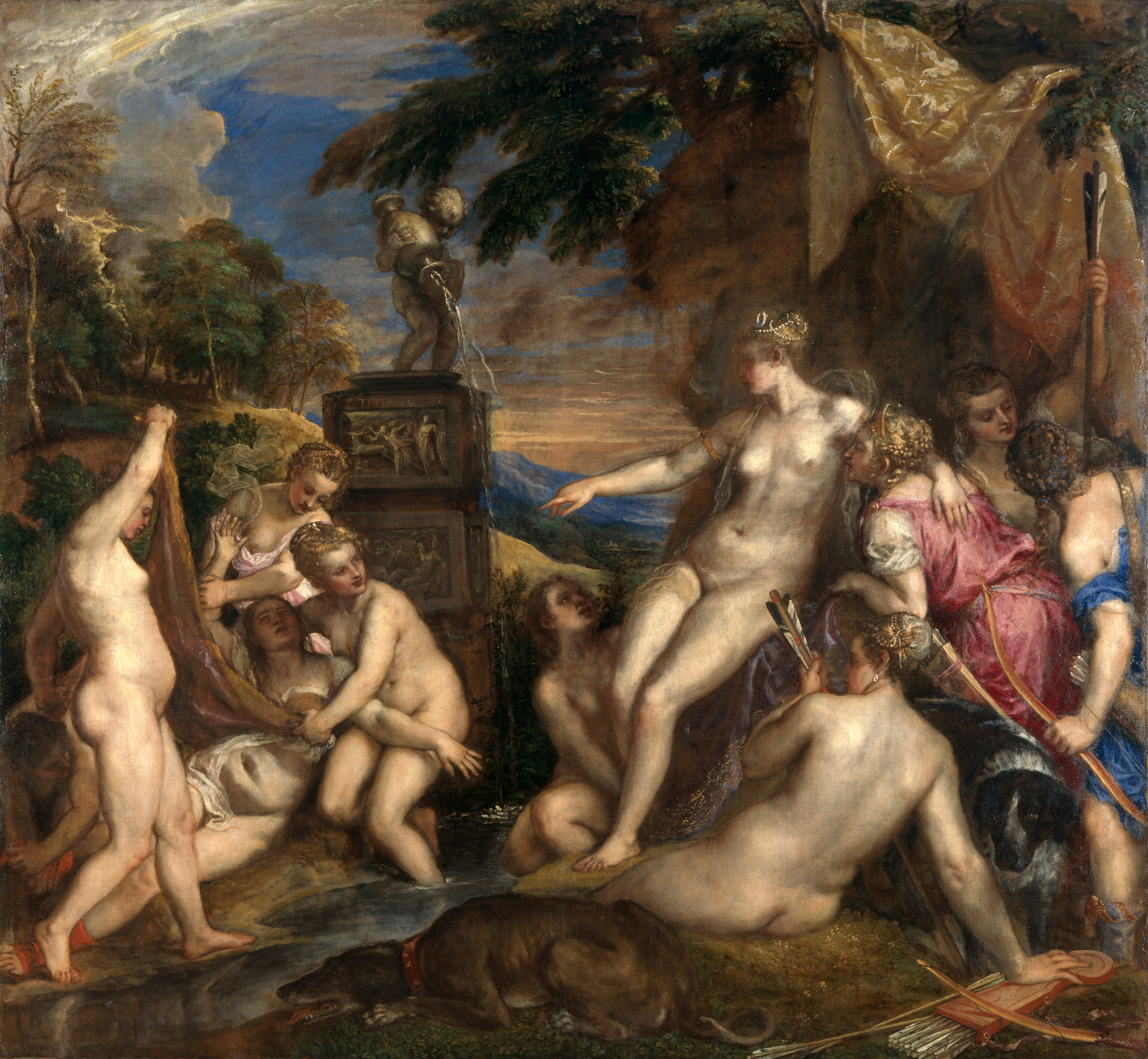
Diana and Callisto

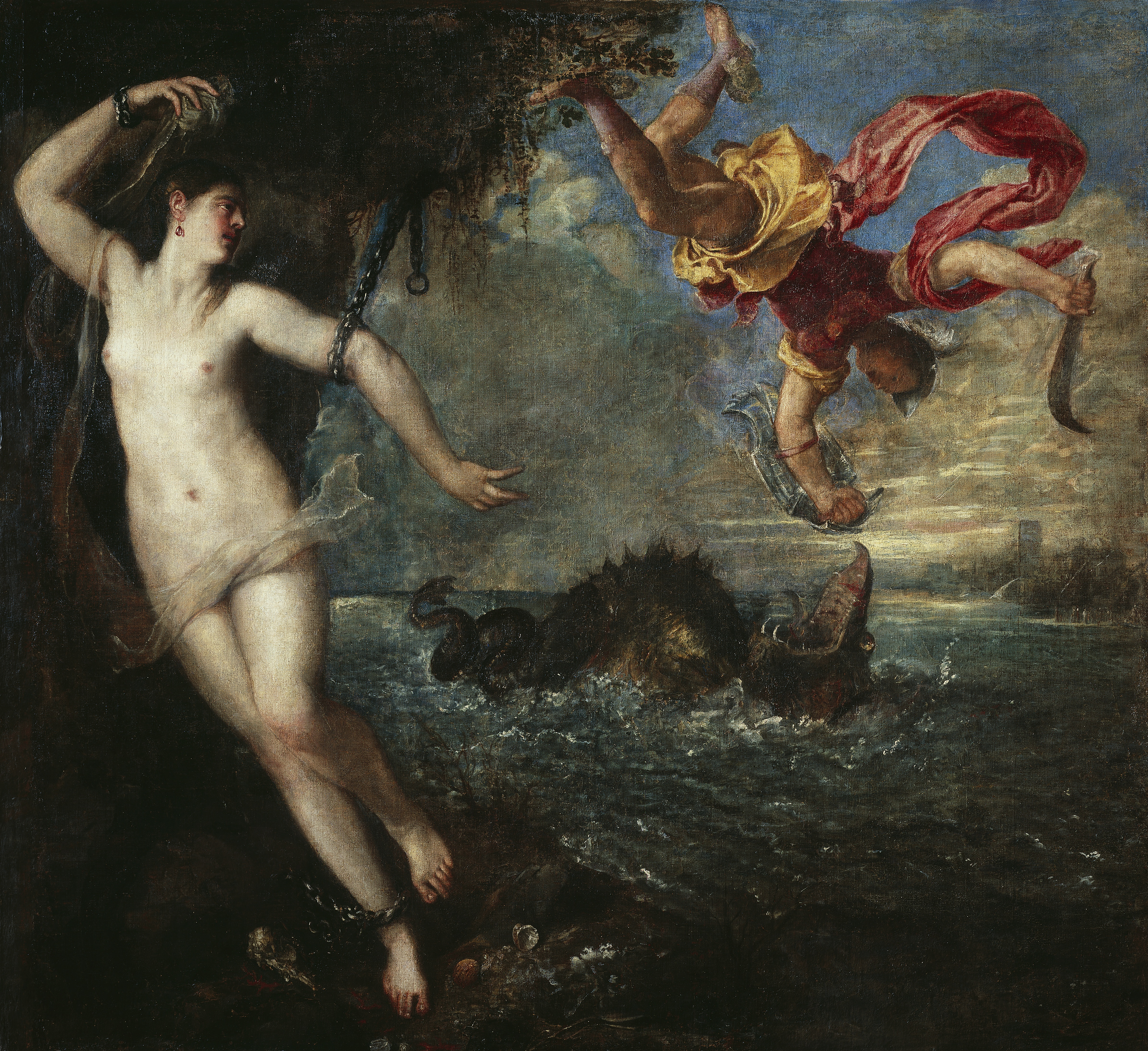
Perseus and Andromeda

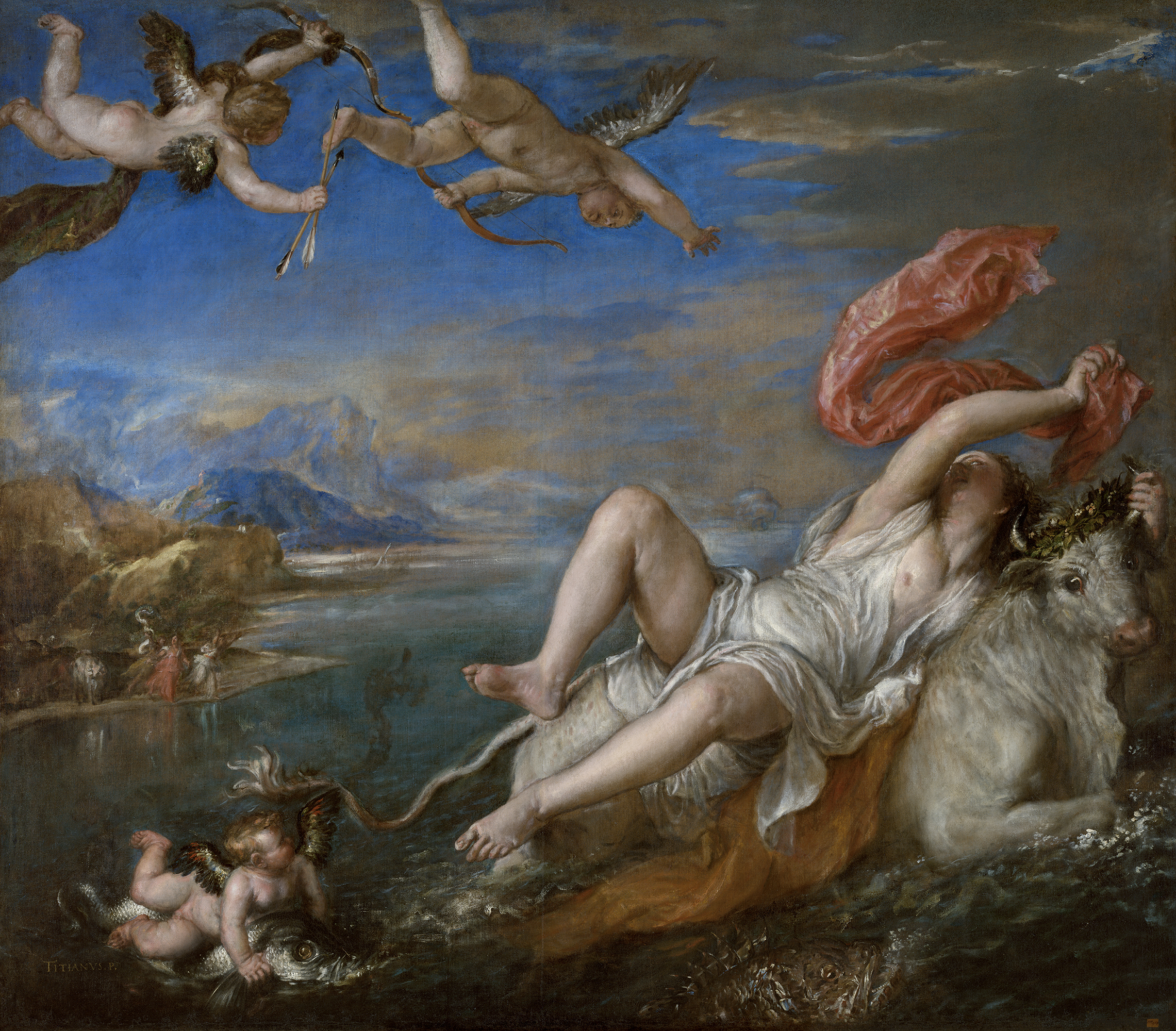
The Rape of Europa

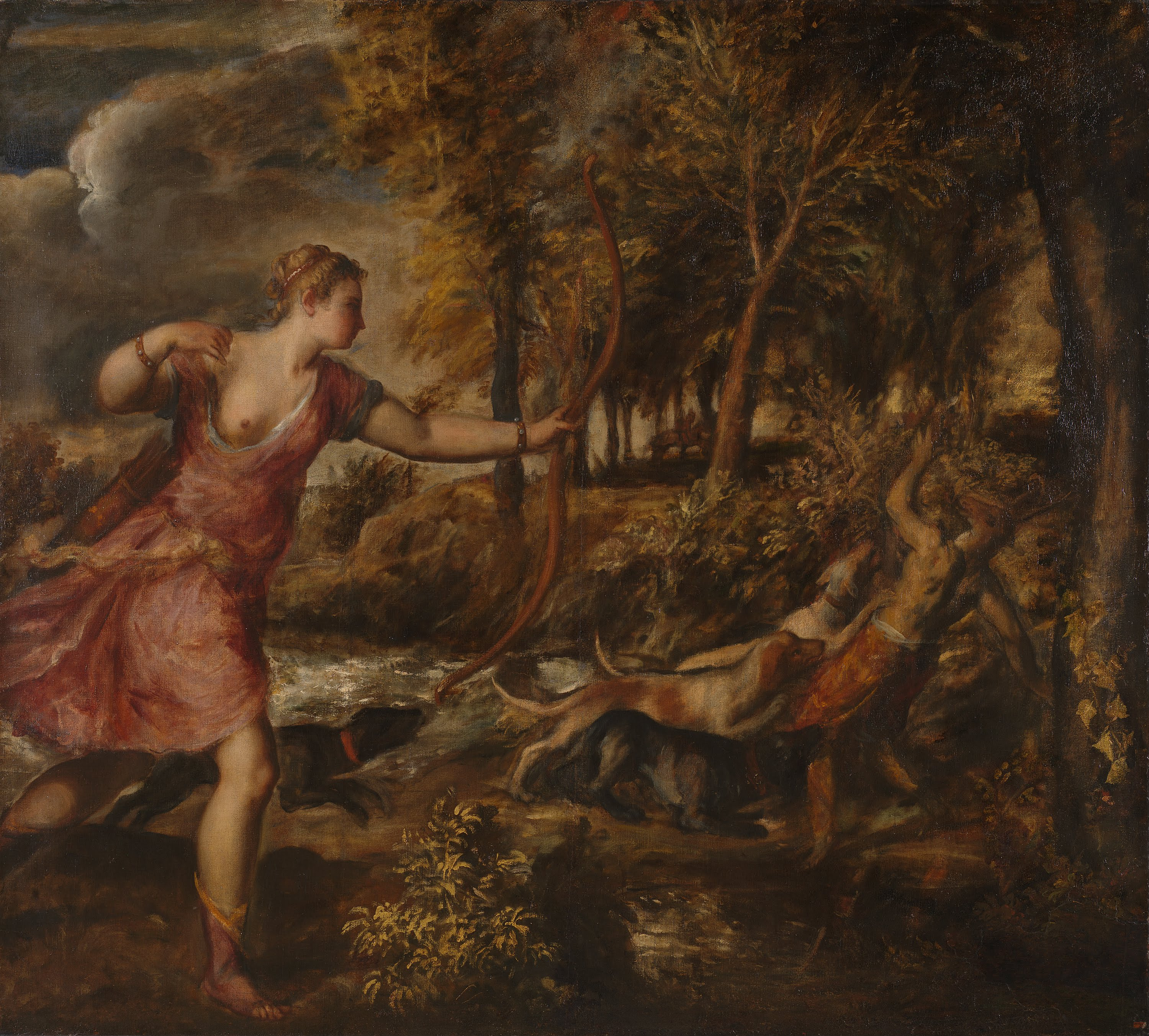
The Death of Actaeon

== See also ==
- List of most expensive paintings
