= Aeon (disambiguation) =

Aeon or æon is a Greco-Latin phrase, originally meaning "life", though also translated as "age" in the sense of "forever". It may also refer to:

== Literacy ==
- Aeon (magazine), an online magazine of philosophy and culture, launched in 2012
- Aeon (language school), an English language school in Japan
- Aeon Publications, an imprint of MU Press

== Music ==
- Aeon, a classical record label now part of Outhere
- Aeon (band), a Swedish death metal band
- Aeons (duo), an Irish music duo
- Aeons (Esprit D'Air album), an album by Esprit D'Air
- Aeon (album), an album by Zyklon

=== Songs ===
- "Aeon" (song), a song by Antony and the Johnsons
- "Aeon", a song by Crystal Lake on their album Helix
- "Aeon", a song by Eternal Tears of Sorrow on their album A Virgin and a Whore
- "Aeon", a song by Killing Joke on their album Democracy
- "Aeon", a song by Lacuna Coil on their album Comalies
- "Aeon", a song by Neurosis on their album Through Silver in Blood
- "A.E.O.N", a song by Sybreed on their album The Pulse of Awakening
- "Aeons", a song by Cypecore on their album The Alliance
- "Aeons", a song by Karnivool on their album Asymmetry

== Gaming ==
- Aeons (Final Fantasy), a number of creatures in the Final Fantasy series
- Aeon, a legendary necklace in Titan Quest
- Trinity (role-playing game), formerly known as Æon
- Aeon, a playable character from the video game series Castlevania
- Aeons, ancient evil beings in the video game Fable
- Aeons, godlike higher-dimensional beings in Hoyoverse
- Aeon Hero, the name of Galacta Knight in the game Super Kirby Clash

== Vehicles and transportation ==
- Aeon Motor, a Taiwanese manufacturer of ATVs, scooters and mini-bikes
- Relativity Space Aeon series of rocket engines
- SS Aeon (1905), an Australian steamship constructed in England in 1905 and wrecked Kiritimati 1908

== Retailers ==
- Aeon (company), a holding company of Æon Group and Aeon supermarkets of Japan
  - ÆON Bukit Tinggi Shopping Centre, a shopping center in Bandar Bukit Tinggi, Klang, Selangor, Malaysia

== Religion, philosophy, spirituality ==
- Aeon (Gnosticism), an emanation of God in Gnosticism
- Aeon (Thelema), large-scale historical units in the doctrine of Thelema

== See also ==
- Aion (disambiguation)
- Aon (disambiguation)
- Eon (disambiguation)
- Kalpa (aeon)
