= Eonian (disambiguation) =

Eonian is a 2018 album by Dimmu Borgir.

Eonian may also refer to:

- Eonian, relating to an aeon
- Eonians, one of the Pelasgians mentioned by Thucydides
- Eonian, a follower of Éon de l'Étoile
- Eonian Tradition, a tradition of the Order of the Lily and the Eagle
- "Eonian", a 2014 song by Elisa
- Eonian Records, an American record label of Charlotte

== See also ==
- Eon (disambiguation)
