= Eon (Korean given name) =

- Hangul: 언
- RR: Eon
- MR: Ŏn
- IPA: [ʌn]

Eon, also spelled On, or Un, Ohn, Uhn is a Korean given name. Notable people with the name include:

- Kim Eon (born 1973), South Korean poet

== See also ==
- List of Korean given names
