= Ali Shama =

Musa Ali Shama (also known as Eon) is a New York City based educator and a painter of "hip hop cubist" art.

Shama was born in the Bronx, of Palestinian and Brazilian descent. Shama has a Masters of Fine Arts degree from CUNY-Lehman College and studied art education at C.W. Post College / Long Island University. Shama had earned his second master's degree from Queens College, City University of New York in Educational Administration & Supervision. He taught art at his alma mater, Lehman High School in the Bronx for seven years. He previously worked as an Assistant Principal at John F. Kennedy H.S. in the Bronx, and in 2008 became Principal of Francis Lewis High School in Queens, NY. After his principalship, Musa served as a Director for Principal Evaluations and Deputy Superintendent of High Schools in the New York City Department of Education. Ali Shama served as the Superintendent of New Visions Charter High Schools for four years and led the Charter network to a 10% increase in the network graduation rate. In August 2021, he was named the Executive Vice President of Programs for Virtual Enterprises International and, in April 2022, became President of the national education nonprofit serving over 30,000 students nationwide. In 2024, Shama founded Eons Education, an organization focused on helping schools and educators integrate artificial intelligence and emerging technologies into teaching, learning, and school leadership. Through Eons Education, he develops professional learning frameworks, AI literacy programs, and strategic tools designed to improve equity, student engagement, and instructional innovation in K–12 settings.

== Artwork ==
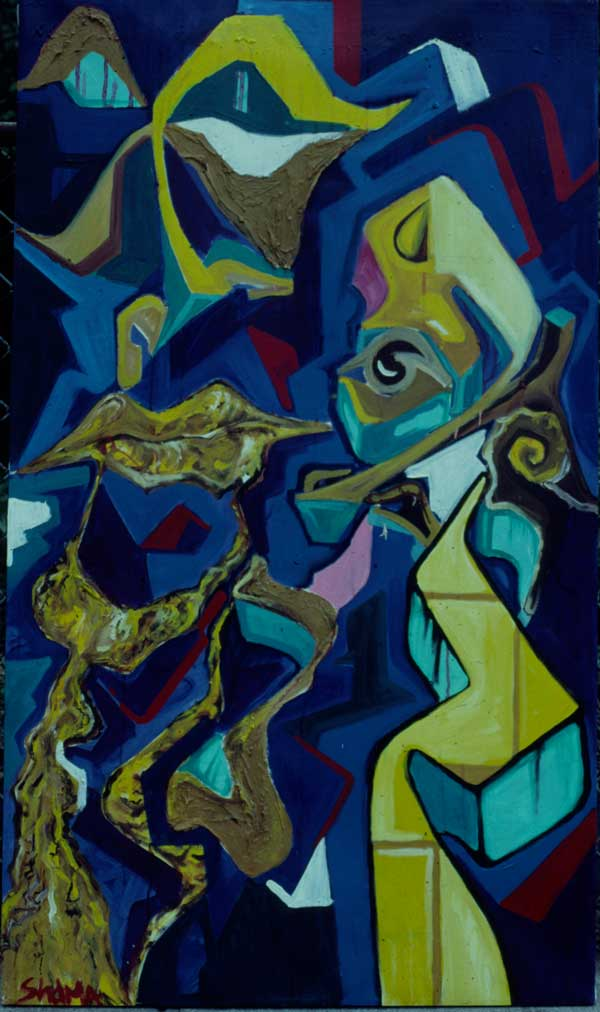
Bari, Oil on Canvas, 1995

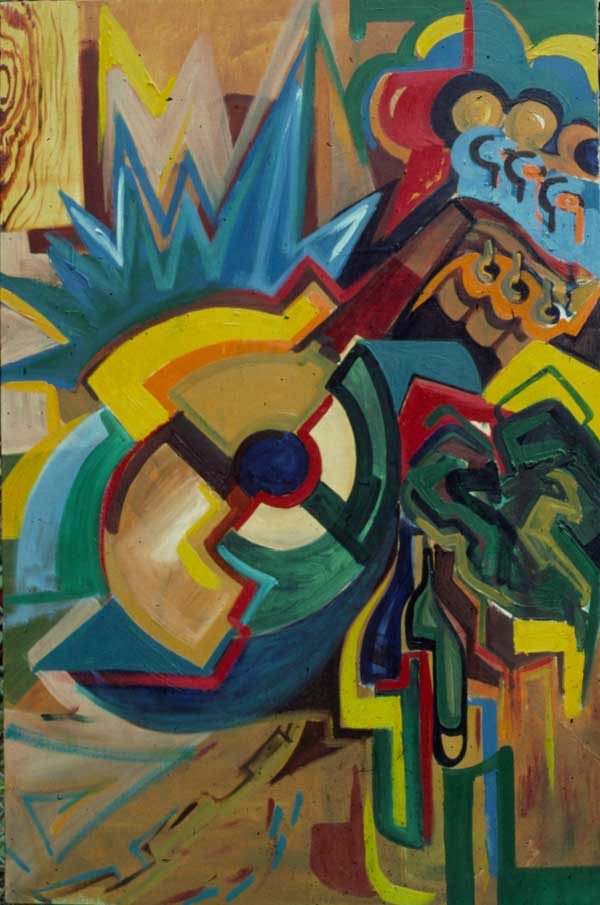
Still Life with Guitar, Oil on Canvas, 1995
