= Eon (magazine) =

- Cover of Issue #001, by Reynir Harðarson
- Editor: Richie Shoemaker
- Art editor: Jake Dylan
- Categories: Video game magazines
- Frequency: Quarterly
- First issue: Autumn 2005
- Final issue: Winter 2013
- Company: MMM Publishing
- Country: Worldwide
- Language: English
- Website: Official site

Eon was a full-color print magazine devoted to CCP Games' massively-multiplayer online sci-fi game Eve Online. The magazine was launched in October 2005 and discontinued in 2013 after 30 issues. Eon was produced by MMM Publishing under license from CCP Games and sold via the Eve Online website. The magazine was distributed to more than 80 countries worldwide. Eon was the first magazine worldwide that could only be bought on the internet.

== History ==
Eon was first published in Autumn 2005 and cost US$14.95, sold through the official store on CCP's Eve Online website. The first issue ran to 68 pages, containing a wide mixture of articles dedicated solely to the game of Eve Online – the first time an MMO game was supported by a commercially available, ongoing magazine title.

Issue #001 was reprinted (as Issue #001.1 on the masthead) in April 2006 after supplies of the first issue were eventually sold out. Eon differed from most commercially available magazines in that each issue had a fixed print run and was continually sold on the online store site, regardless of whether subsequent issues had been released until the entire supply of an issue was sold out.

Eon was discontinued after Issue #030, which was released as a digital publication in January 2013.

== Issue contents ==
Issue #001 was split into seven main sections:

- Upfront (news stories about current events in and around the game)
- In Crowd (interviews with members of the game's development team)
- Chronicles (fan fiction written by players of the game)
- In Character (role-playing style interview profiles of prominent players of the game written from their characters' perspectives)
- Generic features about aspects of Eve Online, detailing upcoming expansions, notable fansites, etc.
- Testflight (a 'product review' of a selection of in-game ships by Eon's 'test pilot')
- Insider's Guides (strategy guides and playing tips focussing on certain areas of gameplay)

In the next issues, the magazine expanded to a regular 84 pages in length and included:

- Alliance Profiles (profiles of the game's premier alliances)
- Eve Quarterly Report (an update of the current 'state of the game' in statistical format)
- Eve Directory (a collection of themed web resources for the game)

Since 2007, Eon had also conducted the annual Eon Awards, recognising notable players, corporations and alliances' achievements within the game and its community.

== Spin-offs ==
In April 2008, Eon worked in conjunction with www.eve-maps.com to produce a hard-copy book version of the site's Eve Strategic Maps. ESM was a 74-page, ring-bound 'atlas' of every region in the game's universe, detailing every system's transport network, resources, NPC types and player outposts. Each copy of Eve Strategic Maps came with a set of stickers allowing players to update the information on regions according to player activity in-game (hence the 'Strategic' aspect of the title).

Eve Strategic Maps has since been updated with an expanded second edition, containing a clearer information presentation style and a system index for easier referencing. Each copy of ESM was also sold with a large-scale 'poster map', the first edition's being a general route map of the entire universe, the second being a detailed overview map of the game's 'low-sec' regions (areas of space prolific with PvP gameplay).
