= Aonia =

District of ancient Boeotia

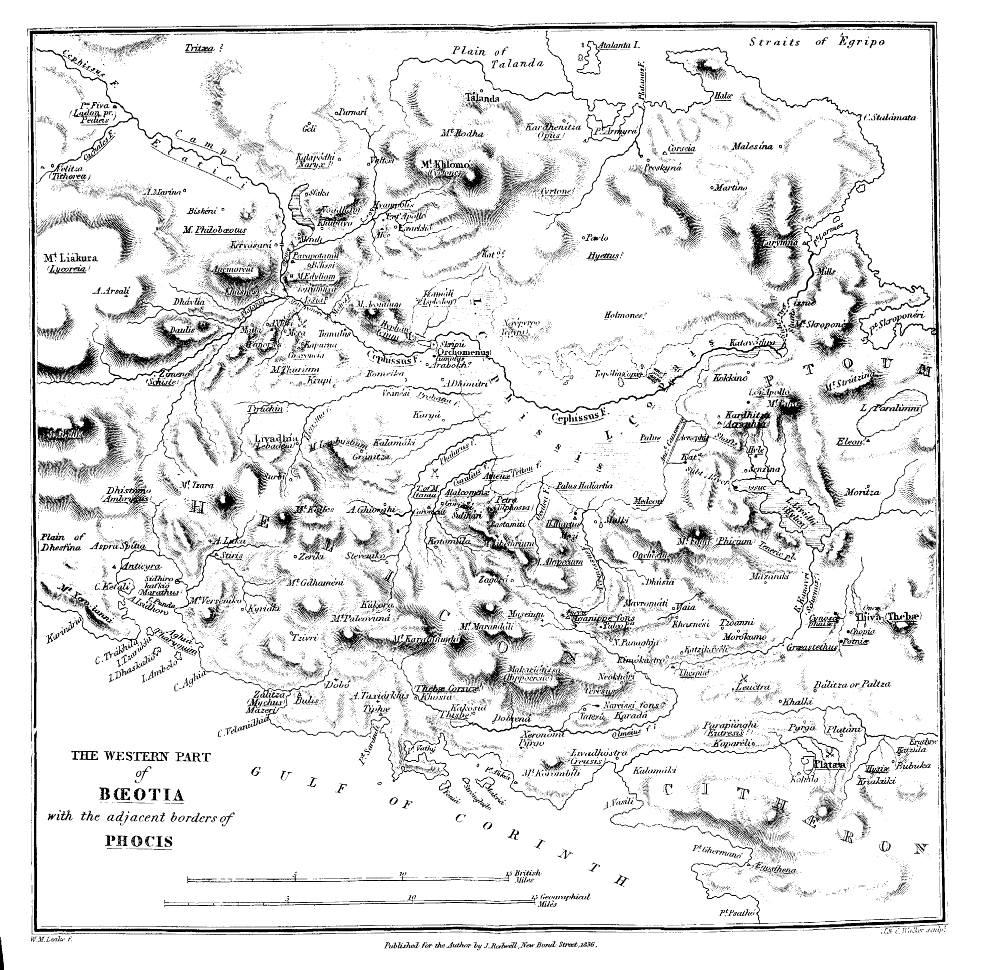
Map of ancient Boeotia

Aonia (Ἀονία; /eɪˈoʊniə/) may have been a district of ancient Boeotia, a region of Greece containing the mountains Helicon and Cithaeron, and thus sacred to the Muses, whom Ovid calls the Aonides. Or Aonia may have been an early name for Boeotia as a whole. Pausanias describes the defeat of the Aones, a Boeotian tribe, by Cadmus. The Greek poet Callimachus may have been the first to call Boeotia "Aonia". In Roman literature and thereafter, "Aonia" was used more or less as a poetic term for it, and especially for Mt. Helicon, home of the Muses and the birthplace of the Greek poet Hesiod. Hence the adjective "Aonian" usually meant "Heliconian" and referred to the Muses. Virgil tells how one of the Muses led a poet up the mountains of Aonia; he also speaks of "Aonian Aganippe", one of the sacred springs on Helicon.

According to legend, the place and its inhabitants, the Aones (Ἄονες), derived their origin from Aon, a son of Poseidon. The adjective Aonius is used synonymously with Boeotian. Hence the Muses, who frequented Mount Helicon in Boeotia, are referred to as Aonides and Aoniae Sorores.

== Modern literature ==
The English poet Ben Jonson berates himself for sloth: "Are all th'Aonian springs / Dri'd up?". In Paradise Lost, John Milton "intends to soar / Above the Aonian mount". Alexander Pope, in a similar gesture, says the bard must surpass the "Aonian Maids". In a sonnet, the Italian poet Ugo Foscolo addresses his Muse as "Aonia Diva".
