= AION Linguistica =

- Discipline: Linguistics
- Language: Multilingual
- Edited by: Alberto Manco

Publication details
- History: 1959–present
- Publisher: Università degli Studi di Napoli "L'Orientale" (Italy)
- Frequency: Annual

Standard abbreviations
- ISO 4: AION Linguist.

Indexing
- ISSN: 2281-6585

Links
- Journal homepage

AION Linguistica is a peer-reviewed academic journal published by the Università degli studi di Napoli “L'Orientale” and established in 1959. The current editor-in-chief is Alberto Manco.

== History and scope ==
AION Linguistica was established in 1959 by Walter Belardi. The second series was published from 1979 until 2011 in the former “Dipartimento di Studi del Mondo classico e del Mediterraneo antico” and it was edited by Domenico Silvestri, while Alberto Manco assumed the secretaryship in 2000. The current editor-in-chief is Alberto Manco. Since 2012, the broader breadth of the new “Dipartimento di Studi Letterari, Linguistici e Comparati” widened the journal scope and therefore it is actually concerned with larger areas of Linguistics.

Among the authors contributing to the journal since its foundation there are Walter Belardi, Françoise Bader, Jürgen Untermann, Michel Lejeune, Francisco Villar, Giuliano Bonfante, Helmut Rix, Aldo Luigi Prosdocimi, José Luis García Ramón and many others.
