= Order of the Lily and the Eagle =

The Order of the Lily and the Eagle (OLE) was founded in Cairo, Egypt, on January 6/19, 1915 (Julian/Gregorian calendar) by Marie Routchine-Dupré with the assistance of Demetrius Plato Sémélas, both Masters in the Oriental Rosicrucian Tradition (Frères d’Orient). After Marie Routchine Dupré's death in Paris in 1918, the leadership of the Order was assigned to Demetrius Sémélas, who re-constituted it in Paris, on October 23, 1919. This is the constitution still in operation today.

== Founders ==
=== Marie Routchine ===
Marie Routchine was born in Odessa, Russian Empire (currently Ukraine) on November 25, 1883. Her family moved to Paris when she was still an infant. As a young adult she very quickly showed her love for humanity and especially for the socially oppressed women of her times. In 1905, she married Eugene Dupré, a French engineering designer, with whom she acquired three children.

In Cairo, in 1910, the Duprés met Demetrius Sémélas, heir and successor of the Oriental Rosicrucian Tradition (Frères d’Orients), with whom they developed a profound spiritual bond.

Through special initiatory instruction, Marie Routchine-Dupré gradually revealed the higher aspects of her spirituality, conceiving and transmitting a new and original doctrine concerning the Moral Regeneration of the human being and humanity.

In spite of the fact that the Rosicrucians normally did not accept women into their Order, Marie Routchine-Dupré was accepted in acknowledgement of her higher spirituality and was initiated (1913) into the last remaining Branch of the Oriental Rosicrucian Order (“Frères de la Vérité”), which was based in Athens, Greece.

In Cairo, in 1915, Maria established the Order of the Lily and the Eagle, in the presence of three witnesses: Antonios Hatziapostolou, Nikolaos Kontaros and Georgios Agathos, all of Greek origin, who became, together with Eugene Dupré, the first four regional governors (Grand Commanders) of the OLE.

Following this, Marie immediately left for Paris, where she worked tirelessly “for the Love of Humanity”. She also revealed and communicated higher spiritual Teachings to her disciples in Paris and Cairo. She died on January 30, 1918, at the age of 34, in a Paris hospital (Tenon).

=== Demetrius Plato Sémélas ===
Demetrius Plato Sémélas, was born in Sylivria, Thrace, on May 2/14, 1884. He graduated from the French School and then attended the Commercial School in Istanbul. Following this, he went to Egypt to work and, at around the age of nineteen, went to Athens, Greece, in order to study medicine (1903). There, he married Sophia Plyta, with whom he had a son, Plato (b. 1910).

During his stay in Athens, he was led to discover Templar manuscripts, which inspired him in his specific mission: to revive the Work of the Templars, which, according to these manuscripts, is “the Universal Association of the Unity of Men under One God and One Society”. Sémélas remained until 1909 in Athens, where he encountered and was initiated in the last remaining Branch of the Oriental Rosicrucian Order (Frères d’Orient) and inherited the succession of this line.

In 1911, having returned to Cairo, Sémélas was initiated in the Martinist Order of Papus, in Cairo, and established the “Martinistic Lodge d’ Essénie, No.III”. He completed the Rite of this Martinistic Order with the rituals of the 2nd, 3rd and 4th ranks, which Papus adopted and which are still in use today in some contemporary expressions of Martinism. In 1913, he constituted the “Council of Fraternalization”, together with seven associates, and drew up the first outline of the “Universal Code”, an inspired charter of principles and ideas for a universal social regeneration.

Living in France (1915–1924), he published the socio-political reviews: Méditerranée Oriental (1917) and Hellénisme Irrédimé (1919), and the initiatory reviews: La Force de la Vérité (1918), and EON (1920). He was a member of the Supreme Council of the Rosicrucian Cabbalistic Order (1916), “Délégué General” of the Martinist Order (1916), and founding member of the “Association des Amis de Louis Claude de Saint-Martin” (1920).

From 1910, he worked closely with Marie Routchine-Dupré in order to found, establish and promote the Order of the Lily and the Eagle (1915).

After Marie's death in 1918 and with the full consent of the Order's dignitaries, Sémélas took charge of the OLE and re-constituted it (23/10/1919) in keeping with Routchine's wishes. For the remaining five years of his life, he worked on its behalf, personally instructing its members and enriching the Order with original and inspired teachings, regulations and rituals.

Exhausted by severe tuberculosis and intensive work, Sémélas died at the Dûrtol Sanatorium in France on August 6, 1924. His funeral took place on August 9 at Saint Stephen's Orthodox Church in Paris. In his written will, he appointed as his successors Eugene Dupré and (following him) George Agathos.

== Successors ==
=== Eugene Dupré (1924–1945) ===
Following the death of Demetrius Sémélas (1924) and in accordance with his written will, the leadership of the Order was assigned to Eugene Dupré, Grand Commander of the Order and husband of Marie Routchine. Despite the many and various difficulties he faced, Eugene succeeded in collecting together and classifying the teachings of the Order's Founders, also adding valuable and enlightening commentaries and references to their oral teaching from his own personal notes and reminiscences. He organized and expanded the Order, emphasizing the social dimension and the direction that the Founders had themselves envisaged from the beginning.

=== George Agathos (1945–1958) ===
Following the death of Eugene Dupré in 1945 and in accordance with the written will of Sémélas, the leadership of the Order was assigned to Georgios Agathos, a Greek from Egypt and Grand Commander of the Order. Agathos emphasized the importance of an even greater practical application of the Teachings, while reorganizing the Order in keeping with the needs of his times and further expanding its Teachings with edifying commentaries. Agathos died in 1958, after having named Vassileios Goulettas, a Greek man, as the male representative for the Order and Madeleine Weill, a French woman, as female representative of the Order. Together they restored joint male and female leadership of the Order of the Lily and the Eagle.

=== The continuators of the Work (1958 – present) ===
The recent history of the Order (since 1960) has seen a number of disagreements concerning its spiritual orientation that have divided its leadership as well as its members. Today, apart from the line of regular succession (stipulated by the written will of each Sovereign Grand Commander), at least three or four major formations exist which operate under the same name and emblem, but with different administrations. Since 2007, official endeavors on the part of these formations aiming at fraternal convergence have been in progress.

== Vision and aims ==
The OLE's vision is to establish Love and Reciprocity in Humanity. This, according to its founders’ doctrine, will be fulfilled by the accomplishment of its three aims, which, stated briefly, are:

A. The personal instruction of each member so that he or she may develop a free and independent personality. This personality (in the sense of true self) is, according to its Founders, the sole means that allows the individual to defend himself against those influences and pressures from the (natural and social) environment which disturb, disorient and alienate him. This personality is the means by which the human being can see the world with his own clear perspective and, by perfecting it, can claim for himself but also for his fellows a rightful share in the true social regeneration.

B. The practice of material, psychic and intellectual Solidarity (Charity) to all who are suffering. The practice of real and consummate solidarity enables the helpers to exercise their benevolent powers and the helped to regain their independence and dignity.

C. The development and dissemination of a “Universal Code” of social organization, inspired by observing and studying Nature and its Laws. Through the moral regeneration of the individual, human society will come to seek and accept a natural, moral and logical organization, which will lead it to its eventual collective health, happiness and progress.

== Symbols and emblems ==
The symbols of the Lily and the Eagle reveal and describe the OLE's mission. The Lily represents Love, Friendship and Solidarity, while the Double-headed Eagle represents Wisdom, Justice and Equity.

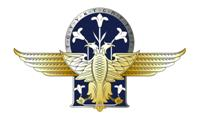
Emblem of the order of the Lily and the Eagle

Apart from the above Emblem, there are also other emblems or symbols which are used in different circumstances. The following symbol, for example, is a linear representation of the Lily and the Eagle.

Linear emblem the order of the Lily and the Eagle

== Teachings, regulations, and rituals ==
=== Teachings ===
In addition to the heritage of the ancient Oriental Rosicrucian Tradition, the OLE's initiation is based on the original teachings of its two founders. Their teaching provides its members with principles and practices for the development of a free and independent personality so that, by applying these principles, they may become a healthy source of balance, happiness and progress for themselves and for their society.

=== Regulations ===
To support collectiveness and promote reciprocity among its members, the Founders of the OLE drew up Statutes (23/10/1919) and Regulations according to which collective life is hierarchized, safeguarded and developed within the Order.

=== Rituals ===
The Order's internal activities are accompanied by simple rituals suited to each occasion. Prayer, supplication, meditation, concentration, study and dialogue are the various means made use of in its activities.

== Organization ==
The OLE is organized and administered according to the model of the Chivalric Orders of the Orient. It confers one introductory rank (Brother/Sister Adherent) and seven ranks of Chivalry. The first three ranks of Chivalry are initiatory (teaching – education – practical work), while the next three ranks are concerned with internal administration or the directing of social projects. The seventh Rank is reserved for the leadership of the Order.

== Finances ==
In keeping with the will of its Founders, the Order does not possess any treasury, wealth or other funds and its services are offered absolutely free of charge. All expenses and means for the realization of its mission derive exclusively from the voluntary work and the optional contributions of its members.

== The Eonian Tradition ==
The “Eonian Tradition” is the new spiritual message that the Founders of the Order transmitted to humanity. EON is the name chosen to convey the idea of the Supreme Being, regarded as the source and ultimate destination of all Creation. The word “EON” comes from the ancient Greek “ΩΝ” which means “Being” and which, with the addition of the letter “E”, means “He Who Exists by Himself and of Himself”, i.e. He Who was, is and will be, eternally and infinitely.

According to the Eonic Tradition, in the beginning of the All, EON, the Supreme Being, the ever-moving and conscious living Essence, penetrated into the non-Being, the inert and chaotic Substance. The Substance, which is also known as “the First Creation”, appeared at some moment in eternity by virtue of a voluntary pause in the Being's conscious movements. To restore order and harmony to the inert chaos so created, the Being projected Its dual nature of Love-Wisdom and penetrated into the non-Being to create there first the Spirit (Spiritual Creation or Cycle Ouranos ), as Its representative in the higher realm of Substance, closest to the BEING (Essence). Later, incomprehensible choices and events brought the Spirit into the lower realm of Substance, which resulted in the appearance of the Material Creation (Cycle Cosmos). Thus, Time, Space and Form appeared in this lower level of Creation. Since then, the ordering and evolution of the material universe has proceeded in steps of space-time as it manifests the diverse and countless life forms of the visible and invisible Universe. The succession and alternation of these forms reflect the rational and wise reasoning of the Supreme Being.

According to the Eonian Tradition, there are seven Spirits who penetrate into the Material Creation or Cycle Cosmos in order to serve the plans of the Supreme Being and bring about the Work of Creation. The human form (not necessarily as we are accustomed to distinguishing and perceiving it) appears last in Creation and represents the pinnacle of the conscious activity of the Supreme Being on this level.

When incarnated, the human spirit works in order to evolve by awakening and perfecting itself in keeping with its primordial origin and mission. This “alchemical transmutation” (= evolution) comes as the result of the development of a free and independent “personality”, which testifies to the elevation of the human being's consciousness to the level of its origin, its mission and its destination. This is the deep need and the spiritual priority of all human beings, who continually receive support, protection and guidance in their work and efforts from the conscious Powers of the Spiritual Creation or Cycle Ouranos.

According to the Eonic doctrine, the gradual awakening and perfecting of all human personalities will have as its result the constitution of the human collectivity (societies, nations, races, humanity, etc.), which will be not an accumulation of individuals but a higher entity with a unified consciousness and unified activity within Creation. This united humanity, as a unified, superior and superconscious entity, represents the final goal of human evolution on this planet (and elsewhere).

The OLE was established by its founders in order to announce the Eonic Tradition, thereby directing: 1) human beings to the Development of a Free and Independent Personality 2) human collectivity to its Regeneration through Love and Reciprocity 3) united humanity to its Reintegration into its Divine Source.

== See also ==
- FUDOSI
