= Aon noctuiformis =

Scientific classification
- Domain: Eukaryota
- Kingdom: Animalia
- Phylum: Arthropoda
- Class: Insecta
- Order: Lepidoptera
- Superfamily: Noctuoidea
- Family: Erebidae
- Genus: Aon; Neumoegen, 1892
- Species: A. noctuiformis

Binomial name
- Aon noctuiformis Neumoegen, 1892

Species of moth

Aon noctuiformis, the aon moth, is the only species in the monotypic moth genus Aon in the family Erebidae. The species is known to live in the US state of Texas. Both the genus and the species were first described by Berthold Neumoegen in 1892.
