= Application-oriented networking =

Application-oriented networking (AON) involves network devices designed to aid in computer-to-computer application integration. Application-oriented networks are sometimes called "intelligent networks" or "content-based routing networks," and they are generally network technologies that can use the content of a network packet or message to take some sort of action.

Application-oriented networking was popularized by Cisco Systems in response to increasing use of XML messaging (combined with related standards such as XSLT, XPath, and XQuery) to link miscellaneous applications, data sources, and other computing assets. Most Application-Orientated Networks manipulate structured data based in a human-readable format like XML.

Many of the operations required to mediate between applications, or to monitor their transactions, can be built into network devices that are optimized for the purpose.

The rules and policies for performing these operations, also expressed in XML, are specified separately and downloaded as required. Cisco has adopted the AON acronym as the name of a family of products that function in this way.

== Routing decisions ==
During the rise of the internet, many routing decisions were made at layer 4, i.e., based on the TCP/IP address and/or the port number. Application-oriented networks work at layer 7 of the OSI stack, and because they can examine the content of the message, they can make routing decisions based on many different criteria, including such things as the value of the purchase order or the ship date.

== See also ==
- Enterprise Application Integration
