= Cleverpath AION Business Rules Expert =

Cleverpath AION Business Rules Expert (formerly Platinum AIONDS, and before that Trinzic AIONDS, and originally Aion) is an expert system and Business rules engine owned by Computer Associates by 2000.

== History ==
- The product was created around 1986 as "Aion" by the Aion company. In its initial release Aion was multi-platform and continues to supprt PC, Unix, and Mainframe computers. In addition it ties in seamlessly with a variety of databases including Oracle, Microsoft SQL Server, and ODBC. Aion was founded by Harry Reinstein, Larry Cohn, Garry Hallee, Scott Grinis, and others.

From Scott Grinis's bio:

Scott founded Aion, a company that developed expert systems and whose advanced inference engine and object technology were used by financial services and insurance firms to develop risk-scoring and underwriting applications.

- Harry Reinstein was quoted as saying:

“Our biggest competitor was not AICorp, it was COBOL”

- Trinzic owned AION by 1993. A reference in a 1993 announcement indicates that Trinzic's formation was the result of a merger (paraphased):

Trinzic set three development initiatives shortly after its formation from the merger of Aion Corp. and AICorp. The other initiatives -- adding SQL extensions to Aion/DS and evaluating the unbundling of some of that product's object-oriented programming capabilities -- are still active.
Writing in 1993 Judith Hodges and Deborah Melewski give the date for the merger:

Two rival artificial intelligence software vendors -- AICorp, Inc. and Aion Corp. -- merged in September 1992 to form Trinzic Corp. As part of the merger, redundant jobs were eliminated (20% of the combined work force), leaving a total work force of 245 employees worldwide. The new firm also boasted a combined installed base of more than 1,200 sites representing more than 10,000 software licenses.

- Although in the merger, technically AICorp bought Aion, as AICorp was a public company and Aion was still private, the reality was that Aion's leadership and technology subsumed AICorp's. Jim Gagnard, the CEO of Aion, became CEO of Trinzic and AICorp's flagship product, KBMS, was discontinued, while the Aion Development System continued to be enhanced and KBMS customers were assisted in converting to AIONDS, under the continued technical leadership of Garry Hallee and Scott Grinis.
- On August 1, 1994 Trinzic released version 6.4 of AIONDS saying, in part:

Trinzic Corp., Palo Alto, Calif., has unveiled The Aion Development System (AionDS) Version 6.4, an upgrade to the company's development environment for building business process automation applications. Version 6.4 provides a visual development environment for Microsoft Windows or OS/2 PM applications using business rules.

- Trinzic was acquired by PLATINUM Technologies in 1995 which retained at least some of Trinzic's acquisitions
- Platinum Technologies was acquired by Computer Associates in 1999. CA changed the system's name to CA Aion Business Rules Expert" on or before 2009.
- It is currently (June 2011) at Release 11 on a wide range of supported platforms.

== Applications using Aion ==
Aion has been used in a variety of industries including Energy, Insurance, Military, Aviation, and Banking. At one point an Aion expert system application written by Covia, LLC existed to do airport gate assignment.

Colossus, a computer program, developed by Computer Sciences Corporation is the insurance industry’s leading expert system for assisting adjusters in the evaluation of bodily injury claims (a.k.a. "pain and suffering"). Colossus helps adjusters reduce variance in payouts on similar bodily injury claims through objective use of industry standard rules.
