= Aon (mythology) =

Figure from Greek mythology

Aon (Ancient Greek: Ἄων) in ancient Greek religion, was a son of Poseidon. He was worshiped particularly in Boeotia, which was also known as Aonia, named after him.
