= SS Aeon =

History

United Kingdom
- Name: Aeon
- Owner: Howard Smith, Melbourne, Australia
- Port of registry: London
- Builder: Northumberland Shipbuilding Company, Howdon-on-Tyne
- Launched: 20 April 1905
- Completed: 1905
- Fate: Wrecked 18 July 1908

General characteristics
- Tonnage: 4,221 gross tons, 2,769 nett tons
- Length: 109.8 metres (360 ft)
- Beam: 14.6 metres (48 ft)
- Depth: 6.6 metres (22 ft)

Aeon was a 4,221-ton steamship built by Northumberland Shipbuilding Company, Howdon-on-Tyne for Howard Smith, Melbourne, Australia in 1905.

== Fate ==
Aeon was wrecked on 18 July 1908 near Christmas Island while on a voyage from San Francisco to Sydney.
