= Kim Eon =

South Korean poet

- Born: 1973 (age 52–53)
- Writing career
- Language: Korean

Korean name
- Hangul: 김언
- RR: Gim Eon
- MR: Kim Ŏn

Kim Eon (Korean: 김언; born 1973) is a South Korean poet.

== Biography ==
Kim was born in 1973 in Busan, South Korea. He made his debut as a poet in 1998, with the publication of six poems including The Sunflower in the journal Poetry and Thought. Kim is a poetic fundamentalist who believes that the task of changing the world should begin with the task of changing the language, so much so that he has named himself "Eon," meaning "language".

== Work ==
Kim published many collections of poetry, including The Breathing Tomb (Cheonyeonuisijak, 2003), The Giant (Random House Korea, 2005), and Let's Write a Novel (Minumsa, 2009). His poetic journey is symbolized as a "giant" that has come running out of a "breathing tomb" writing a "novel." Regarding his works, Sin Hyeongcheol, the critic, has said that "These poems won't get any comments on a blog," warning that "reading more than three of these poems a day will possibly result in the overheating and explosion of the reader's brain." And yet these poems "should be read." The poems, deemed "impossible to translate" (Yi Jangwuk), and appraised as "[Antigone]'s songs—voices that summon unfamiliar times," (Ham Dongyun) could be misunderstood as nothing more than abstruse poems, but they are creative poems that make possible the imagination of "other poems." In that respect, Kim is a poet who never ceases to explore the world, the nature of existence, and the principles of language. He seeks to say what cannot be said, to communicate with things with which you can't communicate. He is a poetic fundamentalist who believes that the task of changing the world should begin with the task of changing the language, so much so that he has named himself "Eon," meaning "language."

In Kim's poetry, the ultimate question regarding poetry is no different from an extreme exploration of language, which in turn is no different from a fundamental investigation of the domain of poetry. That must be why the poetic fundamentalist has suddenly released a poetry collection under the title, Let's Write a Novel. He is not saying that he will actually write a novel, but that he will write a "different kind of poetry." Let's Write a Novel, a collection of poetry that brings together the most fundamental charm of poetry (the language) and the thing that's the farthest away from poetry (the novel) presents a kind of beauty different from what readers ordinarily expect from poetry.

== Awards ==
- Daesan Creative Writing Fund in 2006
- Midang Literary Award (2009)

== Works in Korean (Partial) ==
- The Breathing Tomb (Cheonyeonuisijak, 2003)
- The Giant (Random House Korea, 2005)
- Let's Write a Novel (Minumsa, 2009)
