= Crocale =

Daughter of Ismenus in Ovid's Metamorphoses

In Greek mythology, Crocale (Ancient Greek: Κροκάλη means ‘sea-shore, beach’) was part of the train of Artemis. Crocale was the daughter of the river-god Ismenus. She was probably from Thebes by the account of her parentage.

Crocale only appeared in the account of Ovid in his Metamorphoses where she was mentioned as one of the nymph attendants of Artemis who was accidentally seen naked by the hunter Actaeon:

“After Diana (i.e. Artemis) entered with her nymphs,
she gave her javelin, quiver and her bow
to one accustomed to the care of arms;
she gave her mantle to another nymph
who stood near by her as she took it off;
two others loosed the sandals from her feet;
but Crocale, the daughter of Ismenus,
more skillful than her sisters, gathered up
the goddess' scattered tresses in a knot;—
her own were loosely wantoned on the breeze.
Then in their ample urns dipt up the wave
and poured it forth, the cloud-nymph Nephele,
the nymph of crystal pools called Hyale,
the rain-drop Rhanis, Psecas of the dews,
and Phyale the guardian of their urns.
And while they bathed Diana in their streams,
Actaeon, wandering through the unknown woods,
entered the precincts of that sacred grove;
with steps uncertain wandered he as fate
directed, for his sport must wait till morn.—
soon as he entered where the clear springs welled
or trickled from the grotto's walls, the nymphs,
now ready for the bath, beheld the man,
smote on their breasts, and made the woods resound,
suddenly shrieking. Quickly gathered they
to shield Diana with their naked forms, but she
stood head and shoulders taller than her guards.—
she as clouds bright-tinted by the slanting sun,
or purple-dyed Aurora, so appeared
Diana's countenance when she was seen.”
